= Waterside Bridge =

Pedestrian and cycle bridge in Nottingham, England

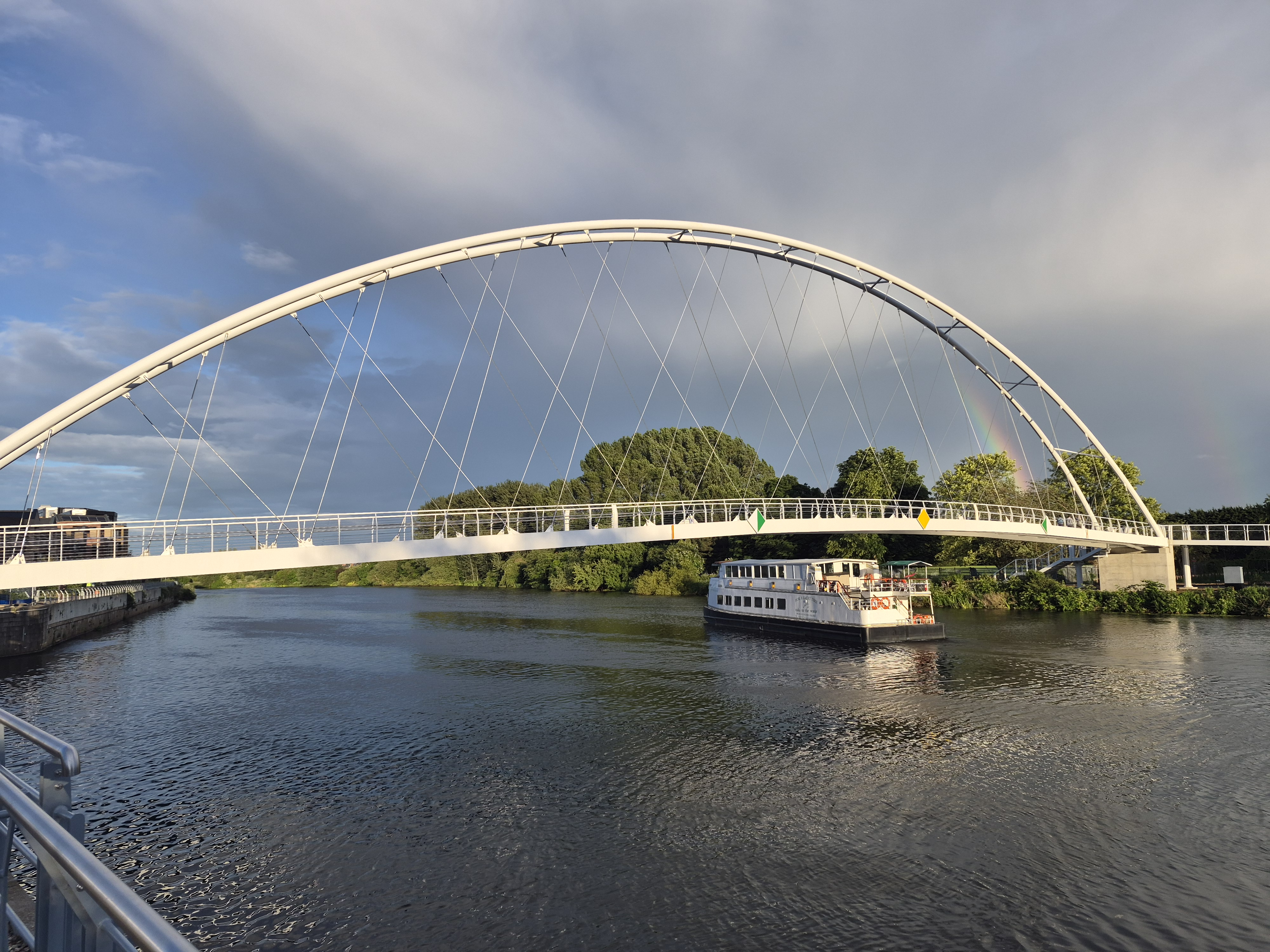
- Coordinates: 52°56′36″N 1°07′31″W
- Carries: Pedestrian and cycle traffic
- Crosses: River Trent

Characteristics
- Design: Network arch
- Total length: 85 m (280 ft)
- Width: 4 m (13 ft)
- Height: 20 m (70 ft)

History
- Construction end: 10 November 2025
- Construction cost: £18,000,000
- Opened: 2 June 2026; 13 days ago

Location
- Interactive map of Waterside Bridge

The Waterside Bridge is a pedestrian and cycle bridge over the River Trent in Nottingham, England. It is the first bridge to be built over the river in the city since Clifton Bridge in 1958, although a road-crossing was created from the nearby defunct Lady Bay rail bridge in 1979.

The main span was lifted across the river on 10 November 2025; the bridge officially opened to the public on 2 June 2026.

== Location ==
The bridge crosses the river 450 metres (500 yd) downstream of Lady Bay Bridge, connecting Trent Fields in West Bridgford on the south bank, with Trent Basin in the City of Nottingham on the north bank.

The site was chosen to connect to cycling infrastructure on both sides of the river. On the north bank, the bridge connects with the riverside cycleway to Colwick Country Park, and also allows access to Nottingham City's Eastern Cycle Corridor. To the south, the riverside path carries National Cycle Route 15, and gives traffic-free access to the Holme Pierrepont National Watersports Centre; The Hook local nature reserve; Nottingham Forest's City Ground; County Hall and the West Bridgford Embankment.

== Design ==
The bridge is a network arch bridge, 20 metres high from the deck to the peak, and 85 metres in length. On the north bank, the bridge lands to the west of the entrance to Trent Basin. The design includes a pedestrian walkway over the mouth of Trent Basin to give access to Waterside Bridge from the east.

== History ==
The bridge was originally planned to open in 2023, but the project experienced several delays. In 2023, funding had been secured and a contractor appointed to undertake detailed design and construction. At that time, a planning application was expected in 2023, construction to start in 2024, and the bridge to open in 2025.

In February 2025, the £12.6 million delivery contract was signed for building the bridge, with preliminary work due to start that month.

By April 2025, preparatory works had started on both banks of the river. In June 2025, the main span of the bridge was being pre-fabricated in Hucknall, and by August, the bridge was transported in sections to a specialist facility for painting, and then later delivered to site for final assembly. The bridge would then be installed over River Trent on 10 November 2025. The bridge was formally opened to the public on 2 June 2026.

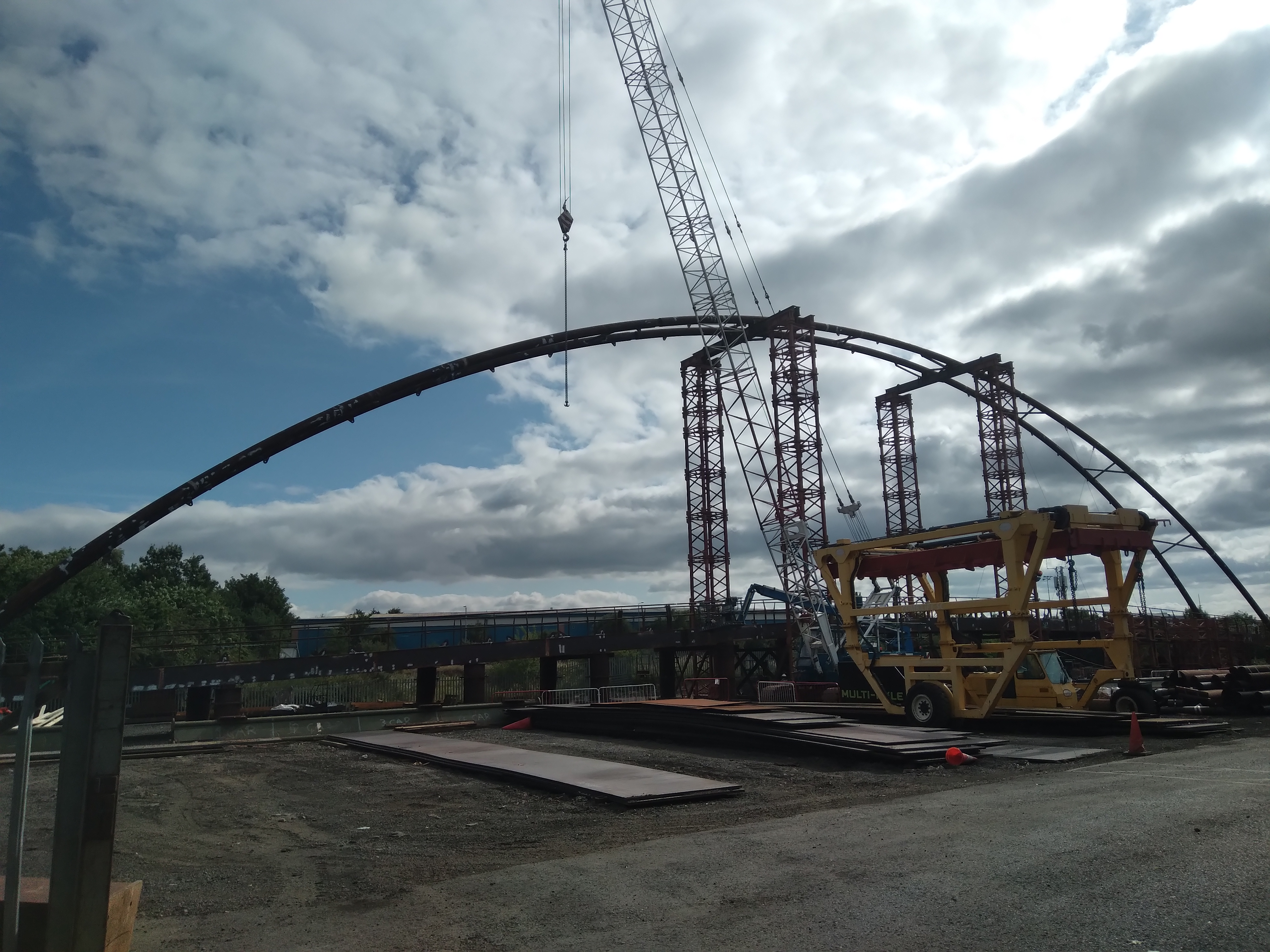
Main truss being pre-fabricated in Hucknall

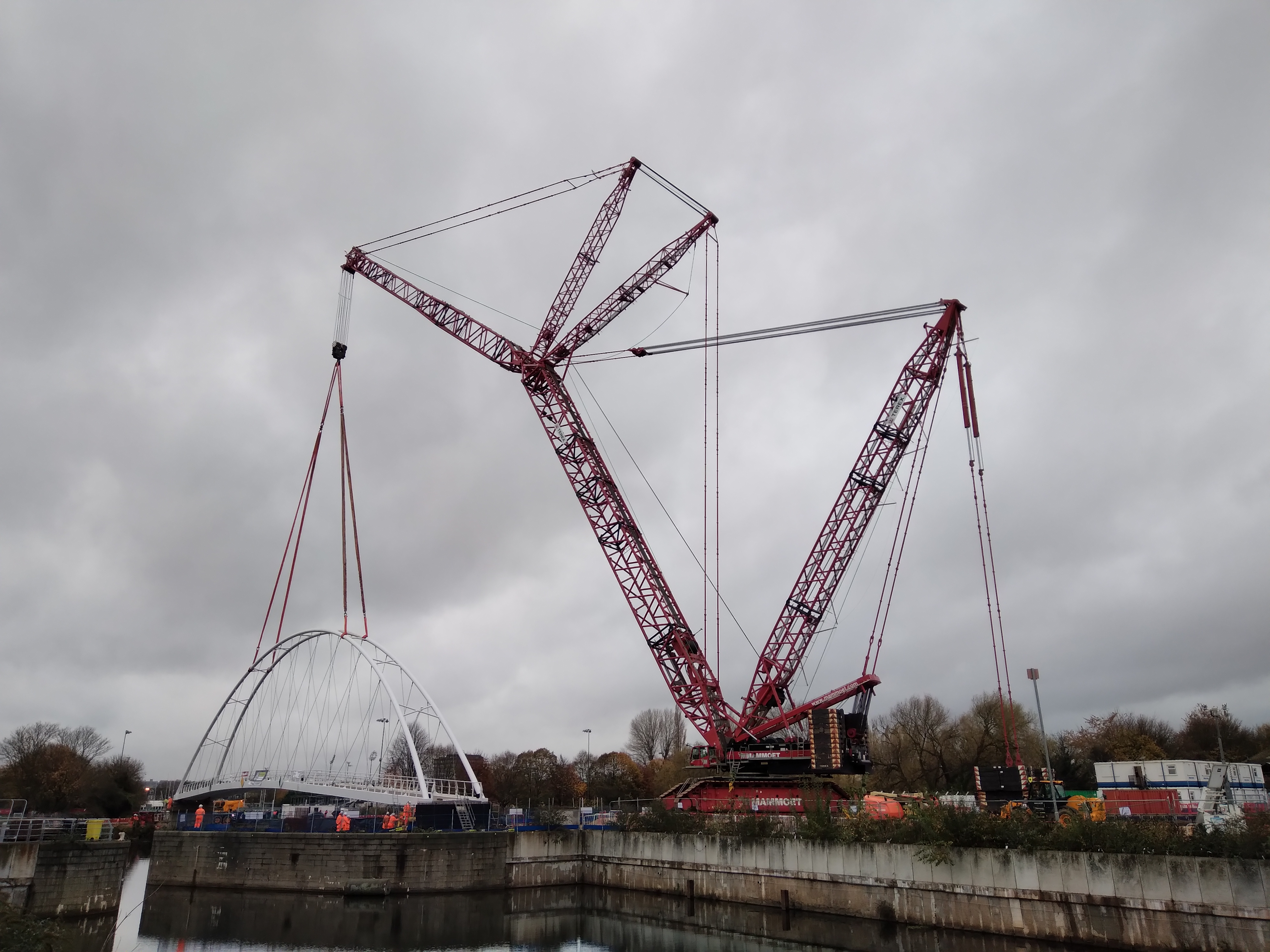
Terex-Demag CC 6800 crawler crane lifting Waterside Bridge into place

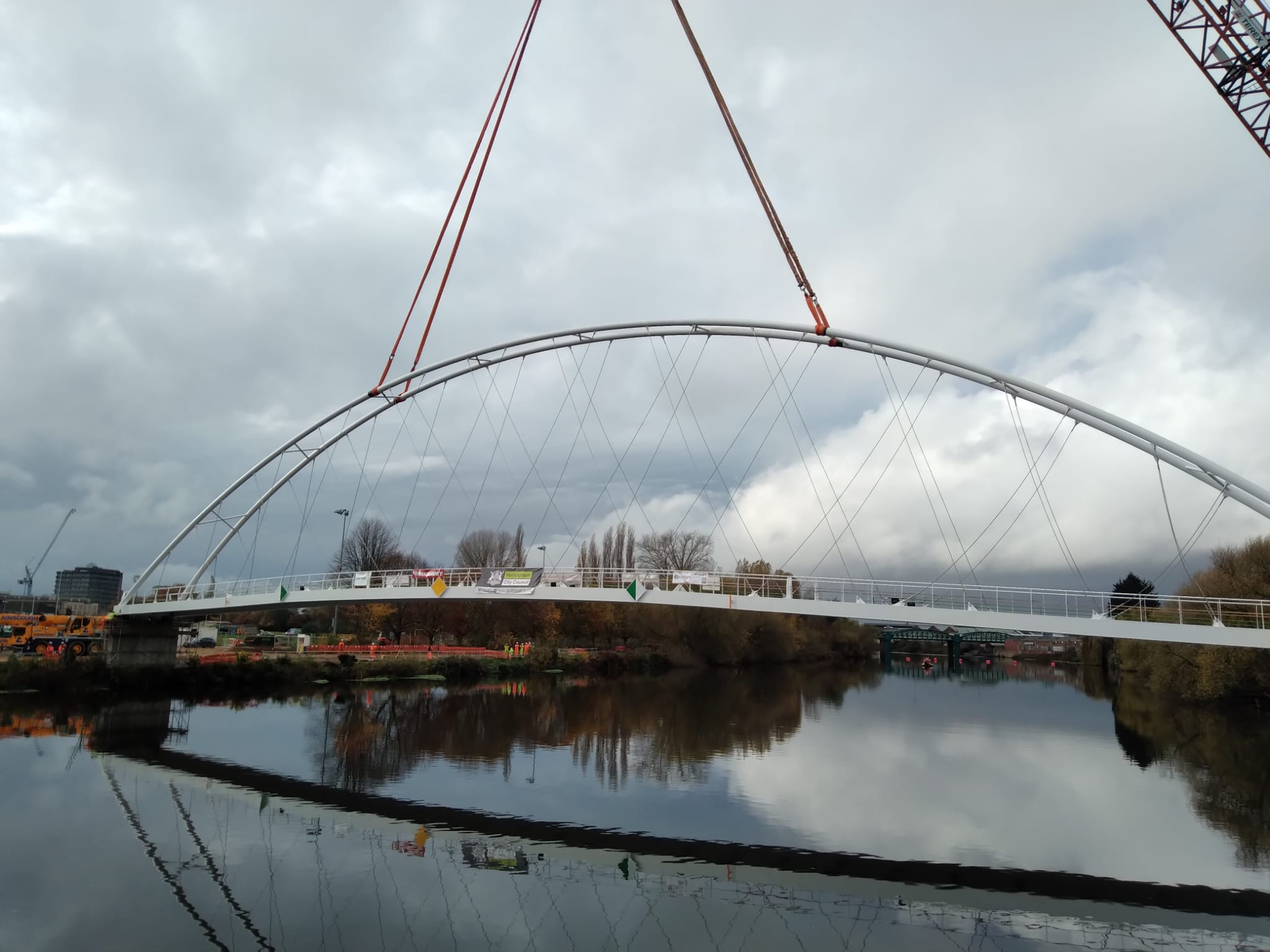
Waterside Bridge in position

| Next bridge upstream | River Trent | Next bridge downstream |
| Lady Bay Bridge; A6011 | Waterside Bridge | Rectory Junction Viaduct |

== See also ==
- List of crossings of the River Trent
