= Wilford Village tram stop =

Nottingham Express Transit tram stop

Wilford Village
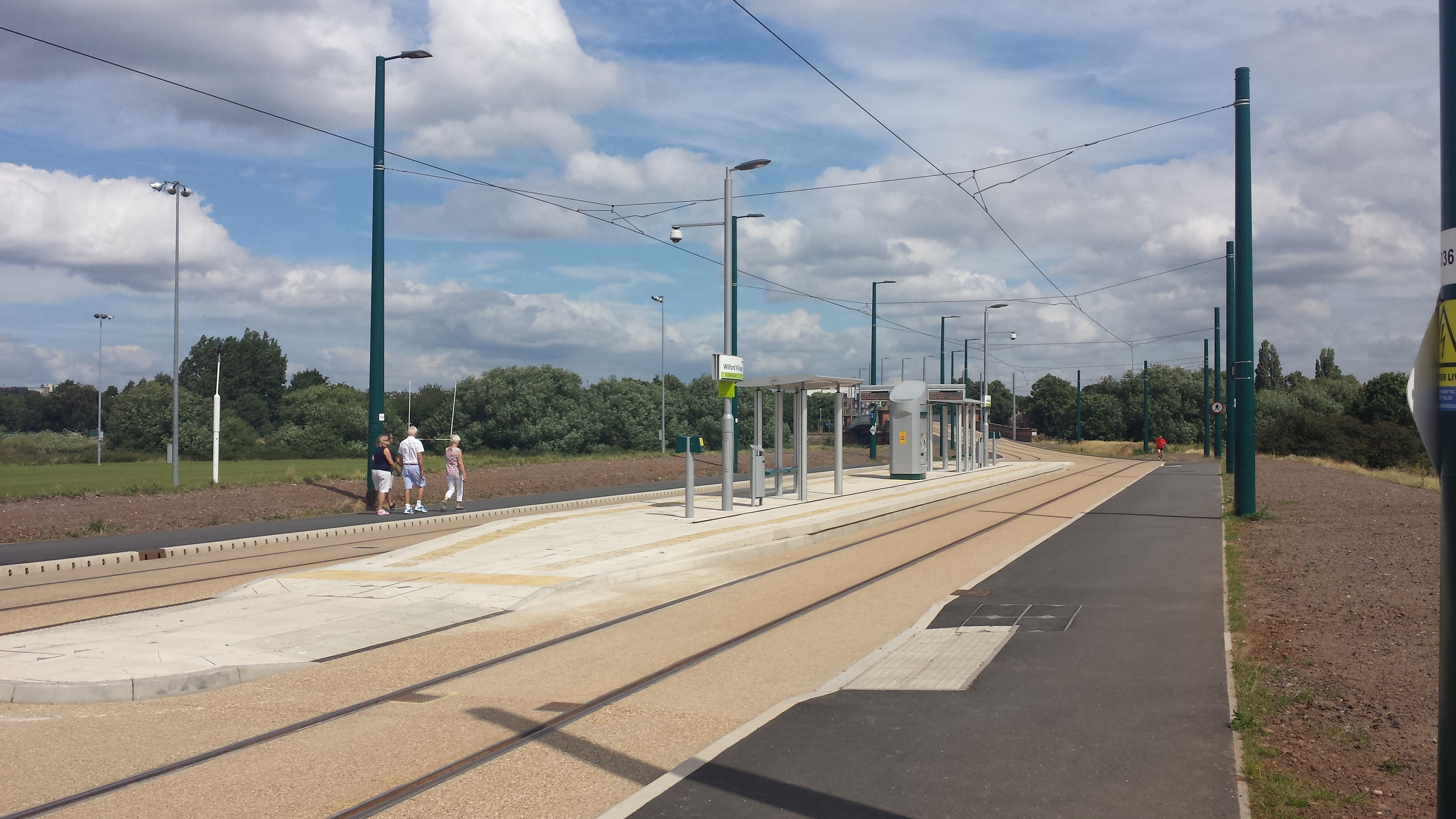

General information
- Location: Wilford, City of Nottingham; England
- Coordinates: 52°56′08″N 1°09′21″W
- System: Nottingham Express Transit tram stop
- Owner: Nottingham Express Transit
- Operator: Nottingham Express Transit
- Line: 2
- Platforms: 2
- Tracks: 2

Construction
- Structure type: At grade; on private right of way
- Accessible: Step-free access to platform

Key dates
- 25 August 2015: Opened

Services
Preceding station	NET	Following station
Meadows Embankment towards Phoenix Park	Line 2	Wilford Lane towards Clifton South
Location
- Location within Nottinghamshire

Wilford Village is a tram stop on the Nottingham Express Transit (NET) network in the city of Nottingham. The stop takes its name from the village of Wilford on the south bank of the River Trent, and is situated between that village and the Wilford Toll Bridge that takes the tramway across the river. It is situated on reserved track and comprises a single island platform situated between the tracks. The stop is on line 2 of the NET, from Phoenix Park via the city centre to Clifton, and trams run at frequencies that vary between 4 and 8 trams per hour, depending on the day and time of day.

Wilford Village opened on 25 August 2015, along with the rest of NET's phase two.
