= Nottingham Corporation Electricity Department =

Defunct utilities provider for Nottingham, England

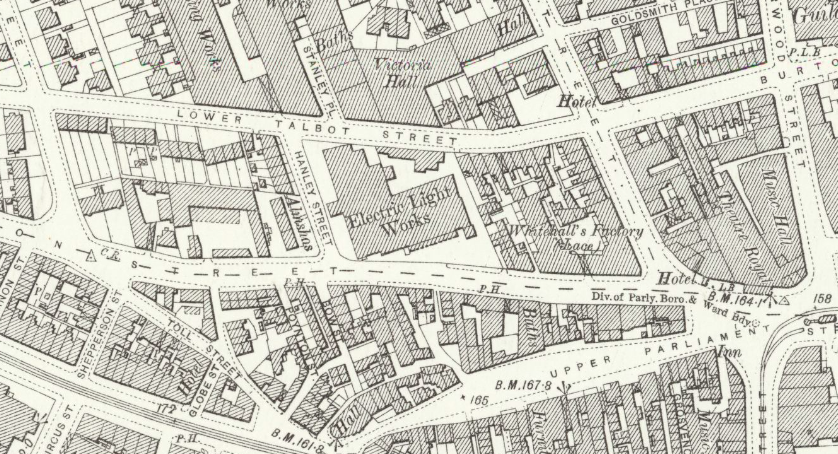
Location of the power station on Talbot Street. Ordnance Survey 25 inch map published 1901

The Nottingham Corporation Electricity Department was responsible for the production and supply of electricity in Nottingham, England, from 1894 to 1948.

== History ==
Although the Nottingham Corporation began to discuss the lighting of the town in 1889, the initial commercial use of electricity was a private venture with a small engine which supplied current for lighting a few shops on one side of Market Street in 1891.

Nottingham Corporation obtained a Provisional Order from the Board of Trade in 1890 to generate and supply electricity Plans were laid by Nottingham Corporation in 1892 and it acquired a site between Talbot Street and Wollaton Street known as Holborn Villas for £11,000 (equivalent to £1,156,500 in 2023). The construction of the first power station started on 4 September 1893. The engines and dynamos were manufactured by Siemens and Co of Westminster, and the engines were of the Willans central valve type. The main supply in the streets was provided via insulated cables drawn through bitumen concrete cases provided by Callender's Bitumen Telegraph and Waterproof Company of London and Erith. The cables were laid in conduits in the streets, and the initial provision covered Chapel Bar, Long Row, Market Street, Pelham Street, Carlton Street, Smithy Row, Exchange, Exchange Row, Cheapside, Poultry, Victoria Street, South Parade, Albert Street, St. Peter's Square, Wheeler Gate, Beastmarket Hill and Angel Row.

The Talbot Street power station opened on 18 September 1894. Up to 31 March 1895 it is recorded that the maximum supply of electricity was 134 kilowatts. There were 114 consumers. One of the first was St Paul's Church, George Street, Nottingham which installed electric lighting in a restoration in 1894.

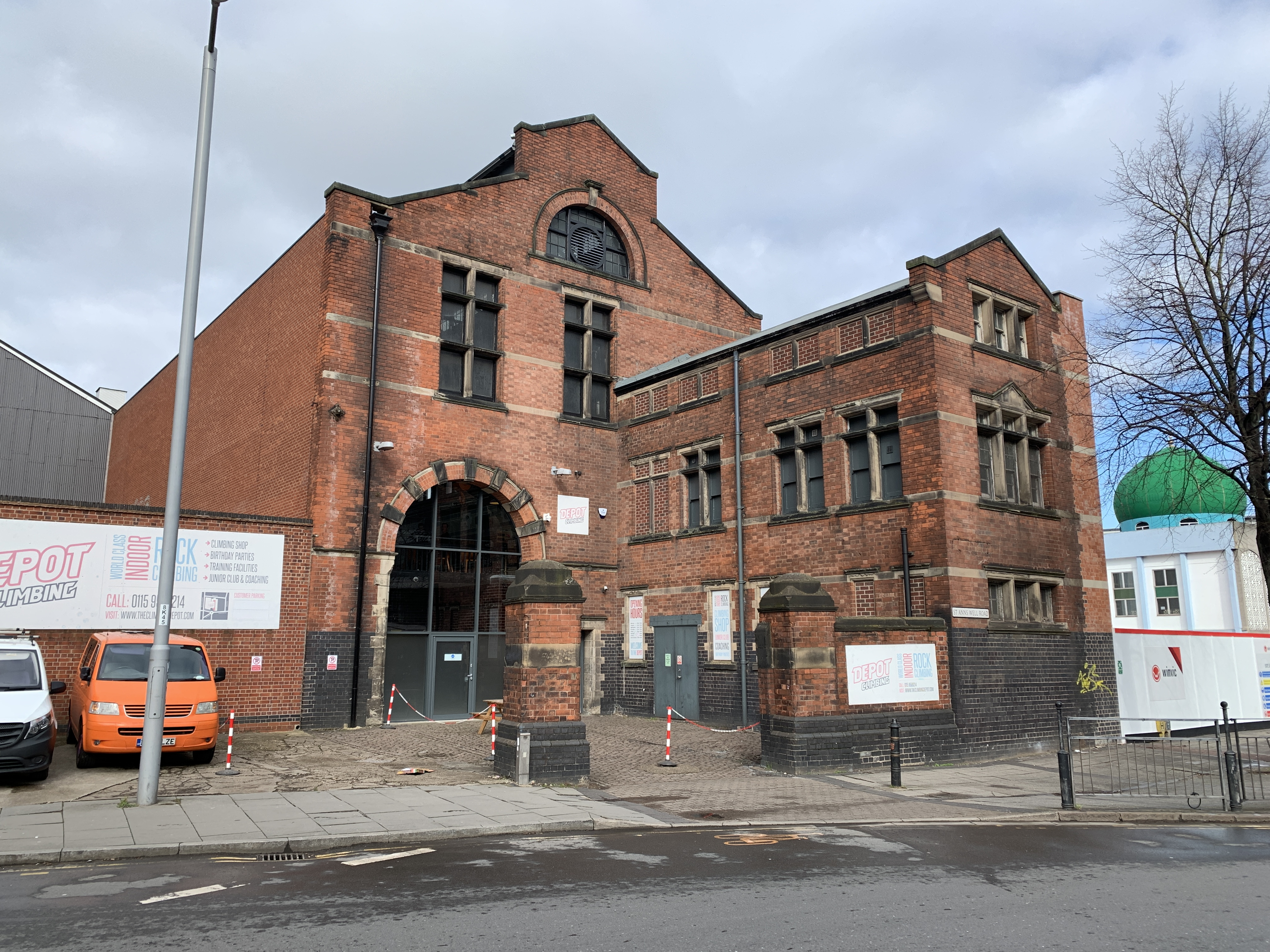
Former power station on St Ann's Well Road (1901–02) designed by Arthur Brown, now Depot Climbing Nottingham

The rapid increase in demand for electricity occasioned by the electrification of Nottingham Corporation Tramways led to the construction of the second power station at St. Ann's Well Road. This opened in 1902. Both the Talbot Street and St Ann's Well Road power stations were designed by Arthur Brown, the Nottingham City Engineer. In 1908 the St Ann's Well Road power station was expanded with new 800 h.p. boilers. In 1913 a new exhaust steam turbine was introduced to improve efficiently.

The city centre location of the power stations was inconvenient as the coal had to be delivered along city streets at great expense, and cooling water taken from the city mains supply. To improve efficiency and meet increasing demand a temporary power station was opened in North Wilford on the bank of the River Trent in 1922 which had a free supply of condensing water, and was close to Clifton Colliery.

Wilford Power Station, designed by the Nottingham City Engineer, T. Wallis Gordon, replaced it in 1925, at which time the demand for electricity was 12,722 kilowatts. Demand grew significantly and by the end of 1933 it had reached 40,800 kilowatts.

In 1927 the chimneys on the Talbot Street Power Station were removed and the building was converted to be a sub-station for the supply from Wilford. The power station at St Ann's Well Road was decommissioned and offered on a lease in 1928.

The company was subsumed into the East Midlands Electricity Board on 1 April 1948 along with the undertakings in Leicester, Derby, Burton-on-Trent and Coventry, the Derbyshire and Nottinghamshire Power Company, the Mid Lincolnshire Electric Supply Company, the Leicester and Warwick Electric Power Company, the Northamptonshire Light and Power Company.
