= Meadows Embankment tram stop =

Meadows Embankment
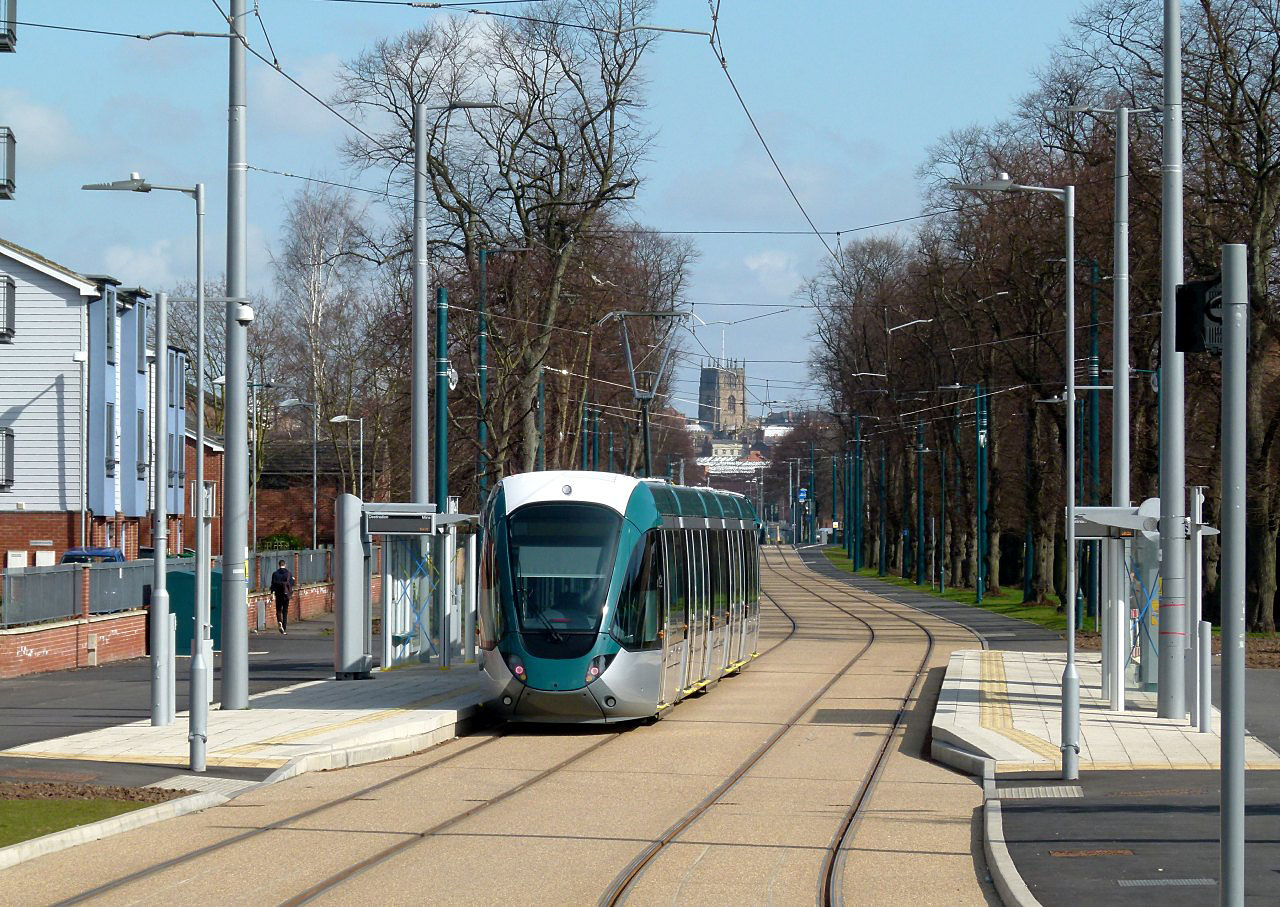

General information
- Location: The Meadows, City of Nottingham; England
- Coordinates: 52°56′20″N 1°09′13″W
- System: Nottingham Express Transit tram stop
- Owner: Nottingham Express Transit
- Operator: Nottingham Express Transit
- Line: 2
- Platforms: 2
- Tracks: 2

Construction
- Structure type: At grade; on roadside reserved track
- Accessible: Step-free access to platform

Key dates
- 25 August 2015: Opened

Services
Preceding station	NET	Following station
Queens Walk towards Phoenix Park	Line 2	Wilford Village towards Clifton South
Location
- Location within Nottinghamshire

Meadows Embankment is a tram stop on the Nottingham Express Transit (NET) network. The stop is situated in the Meadows area of the city of Nottingham just to the north of the Wilford Toll Bridge across the River Trent. It is situated on reserved track and comprises a pair of side platforms flanking the tracks. The stop is on line 2 of the NET, from Phoenix Park via the city centre to Clifton, and trams run at frequencies that vary between 4 and 8 trams per hour, depending on the day and time of day.

Meadows Embankment opened on 25 August 2015, along with the rest of NET's phase two.

The stop is situated near the junction of Queen's Walk and Victoria Embankment and Memorial Gardens, and in the original plans for NET phase two, the stop was known as Queens Walk. However, by popular demand this name was transferred to the next stop north on Queens Walk, nearer the Queens Walk Park and Community Centre, and the current name adopted as a synthesis of The Meadows and Victoria Embankment.
