= Wilford Suspension Bridge =

Footbridge and aqueduct over the River Trent in England

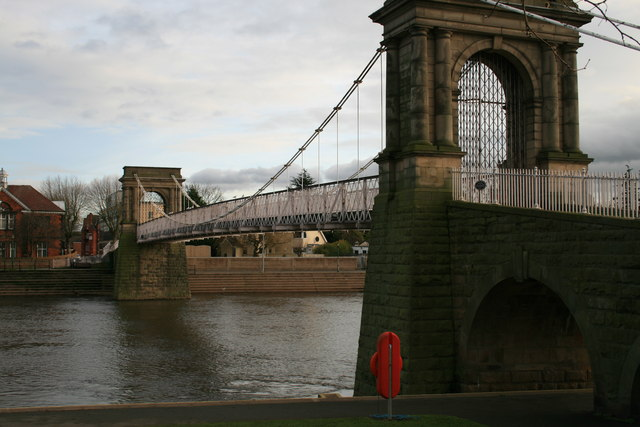
- Wilford Suspension Bridge as viewed from the Meadows
- Coordinates: 52.9332°N 1.1393°W
- OS grid reference: SK 57936 37665
- Carries: Pedestrians, water main and gas pipelines
- Crosses: River Trent
- Locale: City of Nottingham
- Other name: Meadows Suspension Bridge
- Owner: originally: Nottingham Corporation Water Department, then: Severn Trent Water Authority, now: Severn Trent Water
- Heritage status: Grade II listed structure
- Preceded by: Wilford Toll Bridge
- Followed by: Trent Bridge

Characteristics
- Design: Suspension bridge
- Material: Stone-clad towers, twin dual steel suspension cables, ashlar and steel
- Width: 12 feet (3.7 metres)
- Traversable?: Yes
- Longest span: 225 feet (69 metres)
- No. of spans: One

History
- Architect: Arthur Brown
- Engineering design by: Elliott & Brown
- Constructed by: Nottingham Corporation Water Department
- Construction cost: £8,871 (equivalent to £860,000 in 2025),
- Opened: 1906
- Rebuilt: 2008–2010

Location
- Interactive map of Wilford Suspension Bridge

Wilford Suspension Bridge, also known as Meadows Suspension Bridge, It is a combined suspension footbridge for pedestrians and cyclists, and aqueduct which crosses the River Trent, linking the town of West Bridgford to the Meadows, in the city of Nottingham, England. It also carries a gas main.

The bridge is owned by Severn Trent Water. It should not be confused with the separate Wilford Toll Bridge.

There is no public right of way along the bridge, and so it can be closed by Severn Trent Water whenever it is deemed expedient to do so. It is a Grade II listed structure.

== History ==
The bridge was designed by the engineer Arthur Brown, of Elliott & Brown (Civil and Structural Engineering Consultancy). The plans were drawn up by Frank Beckett Lewis, the City Architect. It was constructed by the Nottingham Corporation Water Department at a cost of £8,871 (equivalent to £860,000 in 2025), with the principal purpose of carrying water to Wilford Hill reservoir.

Responsibility for the bridge was transferred from the Nottingham Corporation Water Department to the Severn Trent Water Authority in April 1974, upon the reorganisation of the water industry in England and Wales, and subsequently to Severn Trent Water in 1989 prior to the privatisation of the water industry.

Following a restoration in 1983, the bridge was closed to pedestrians in July 2008 for a major restoration, following reports of falling debris. It re-opened on 12 February 2010 after a £1.9m refurbishment.

== Technical details ==
- Gas main — two 12 inches (30 centimetres) diameter pipes
- Water main — one 14 inches (36 centimetres) diameter pipe

Next footbridge crossing upstream	River Trent	Next footbridge crossing downstream
Wilford Toll Bridge	Wilford Suspension Bridge; Grid reference SK 57936 37665	Trent Bridge; A60

== See also ==
- List of crossings of the River Trent
