= Queens Walk tram stop =

Nottingham Express Transit tram stop

Queens Walk
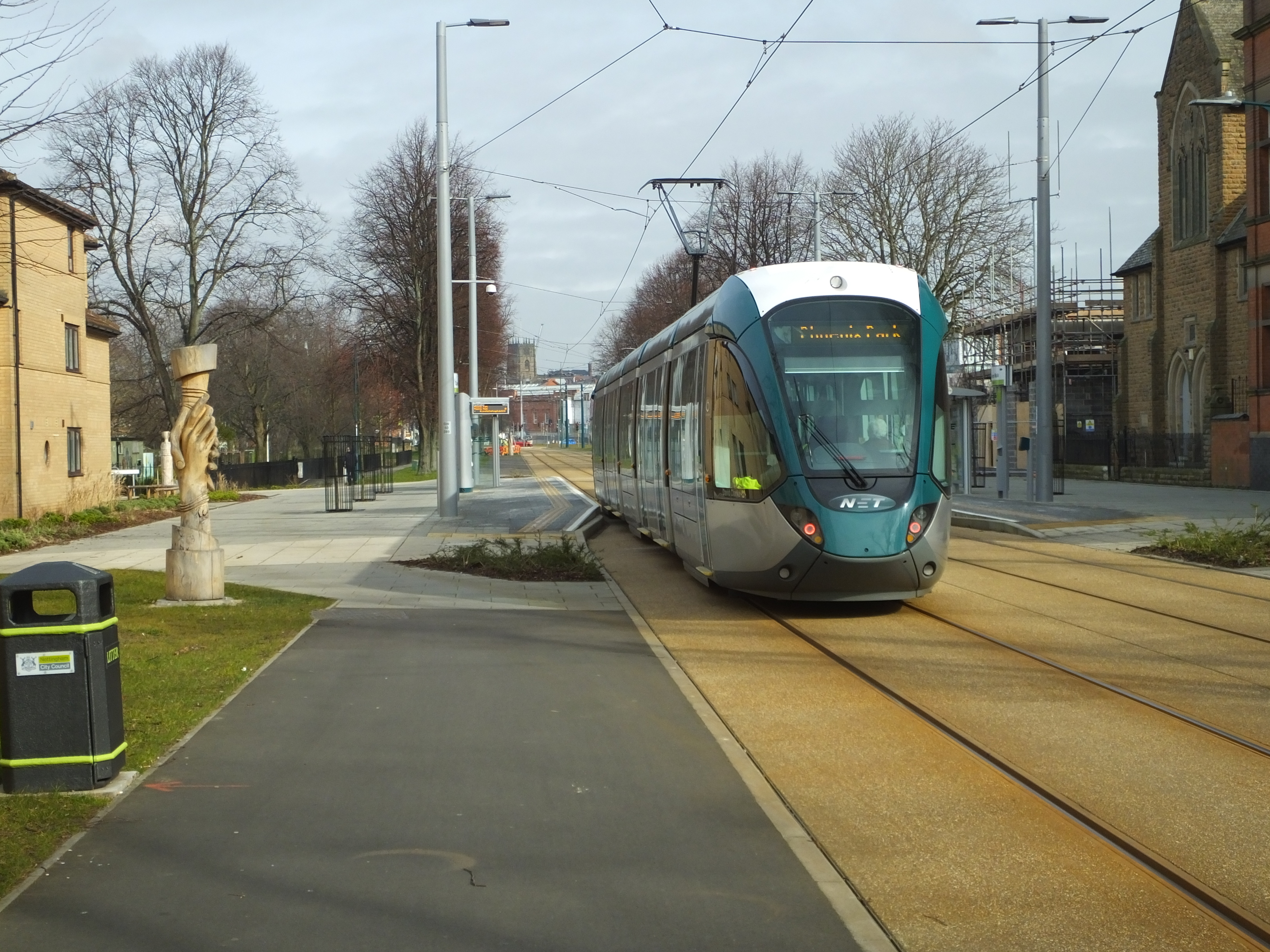

General information
- Location: The Meadows, City of Nottingham; England
- Coordinates: 52°56′33″N 1°09′02″W
- System: Nottingham Express Transit tram stop
- Owner: Nottingham Express Transit
- Operator: Nottingham Express Transit
- Line: 2
- Platforms: 2
- Tracks: 2

Construction
- Structure type: At grade; on reserved track
- Accessible: Step-free access to platform

Key dates
- 25 August 2015: Opened

Services
Preceding station	NET	Following station
Nottingham Station towards Phoenix Park	Line 2	Meadows Embankment towards Clifton South
Location
- Location within Nottinghamshire

Queens Walk is a tram stop on the Nottingham Express Transit (NET) network, previously known as Meadows Centre. The stop is situated on Queens Walk in the Meadows area of the city of Nottingham. It is situated on reserved track and comprises a pair of side platforms flanking the tracks. The stop is on line 2 of the NET, from Phoenix Park via the city centre to Clifton, and trams run at frequencies that vary between 4 and 8 trams per hour, depending on the day and time of day.

Queens Walk opened on 25 August 2015, along with the rest of NET's phase two.

In the original plans for NET phase two, the stop now known as Meadows Embankment was to be called Queens Walk. However, by popular demand this name was transferred to this stop, which had previously known as Meadows Centre.

== Gallery ==
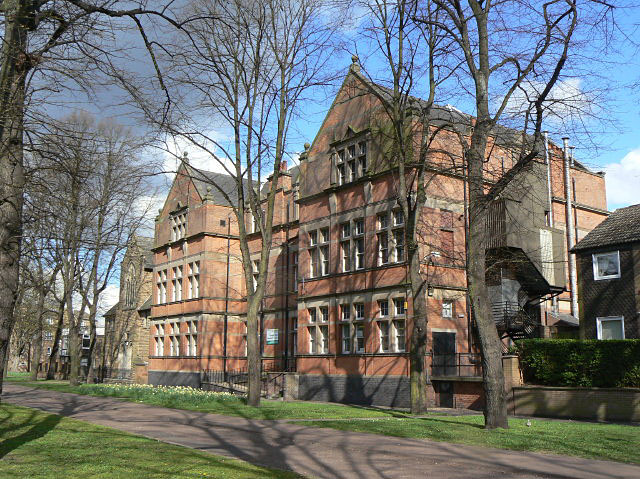
The site of the stop in 2009 before construction started

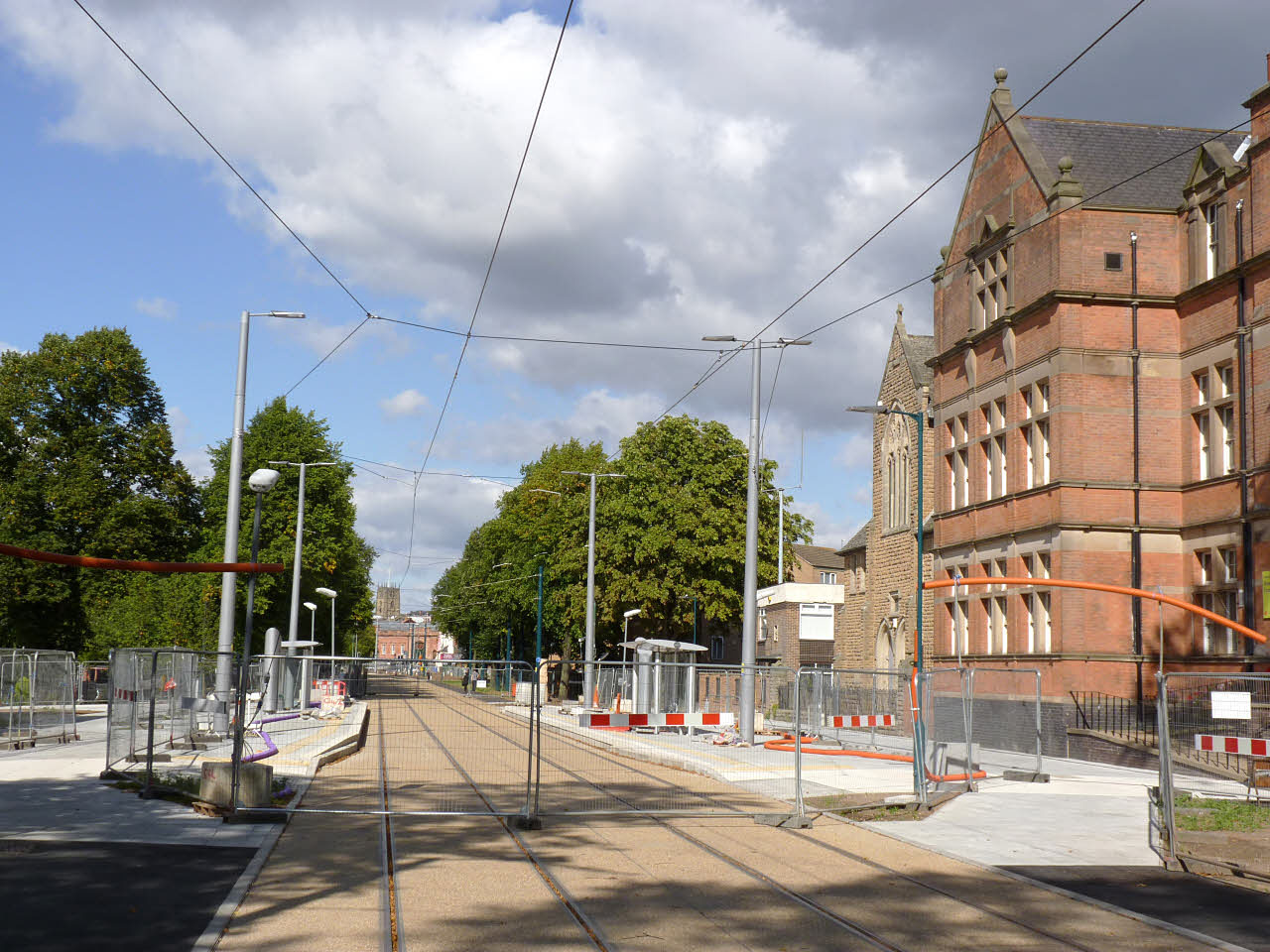
The stop under construction in 2014

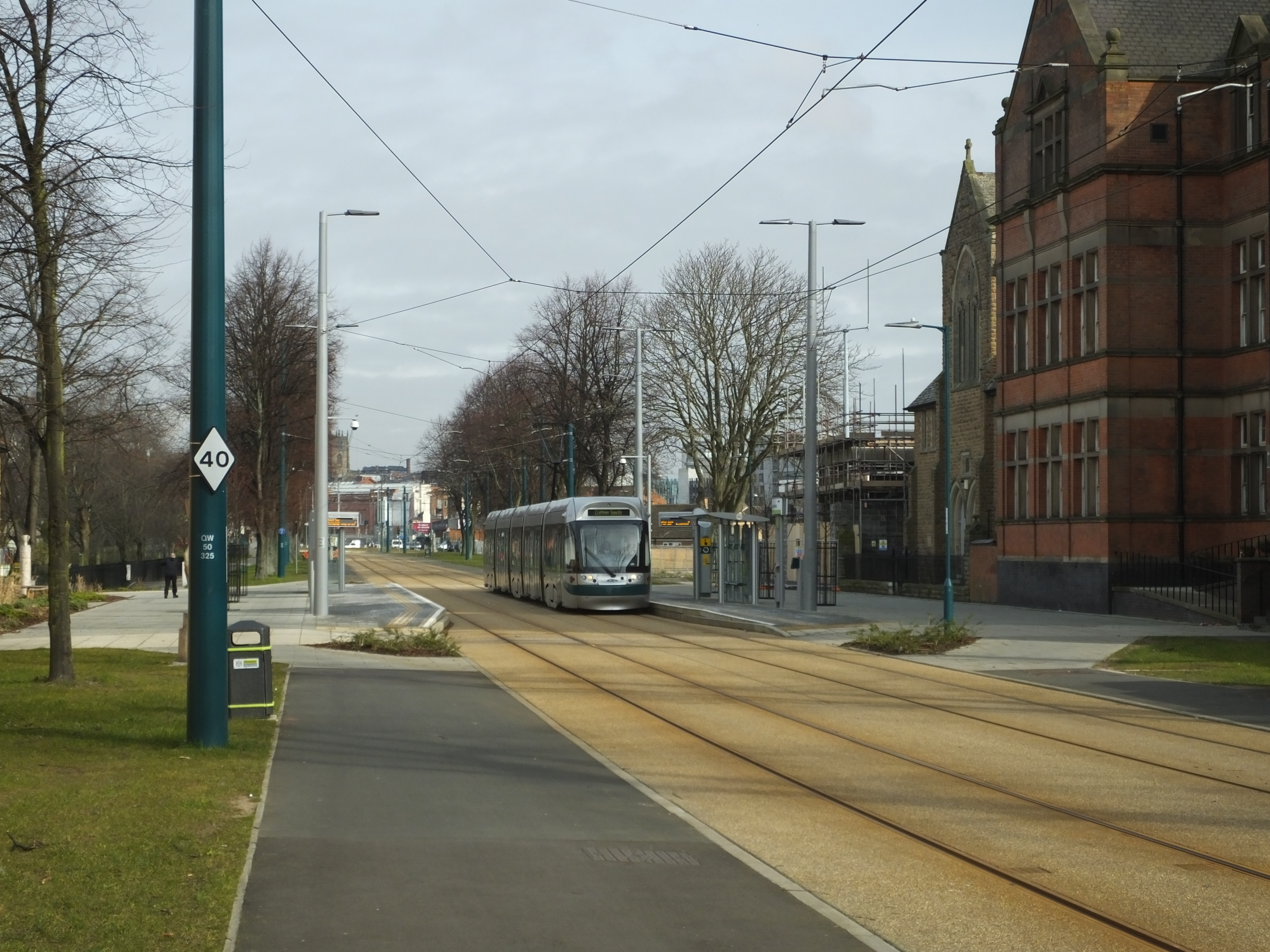
A similar view in 2016, with the stop in use
