= Lady Bay Bridge =

Road bridge (ex railway) in Nottingham, England

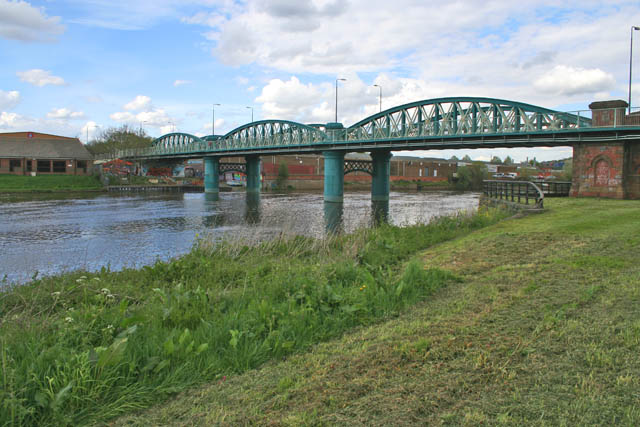
- Lady Bay Bridge
- Coordinates: 52°56′34″N 1°07′53″W
- Carries: Road traffic A6011
- Crosses: River Trent

History
- Opened: 1878

Location
- Interactive map of Lady Bay Bridge

Lady Bay Bridge is a road bridge of two lanes that spans the River Trent in West Bridgford, Nottingham. Previously a rail bridge, it is following (downstream) from Trent Bridge and connects the main thoroughfare of Radcliffe Road (on the south side) with Meadow Lane (on the north side).

== History ==
Evidence of a bridge in this area goes back as far as the Saxons who crossed in the same area. Then in the 15th century, when it was decided to build a bridge in this area, they used the original arches of Lady Bay bridge dating back to the 15th century.

The present bridge was built as the rail crossing for the Midland Railway from Melton Mowbray to Nottingham Station (formerly known as Nottingham Midland).

=== Conversion ===
When the Nottingham direct line of the Midland Railway was abandoned in 1968, plans were made to convert the river crossing and so relieve pressure on Trent Bridge. However, these works were not complete until 1979.

Construction started in November 1978. One lane north-south opened on Sunday 16 December 1979. Conservative county councillor Stewart Pattinson was the first to drive over. It cost £1.3m, being part of the Nottingham Eastern Outer Loop. The rest opened around April 1980.

In the morning of 4 July 2022, a lorry crashed from the bridge striking a parapet and damaging the crash barrier. The bridge was closed for repairs, with one lane reopening on 11 July 2022 following the installation of temporary concrete barriers. The driver of the lorry suffered a broken arm. There were no further injuries.

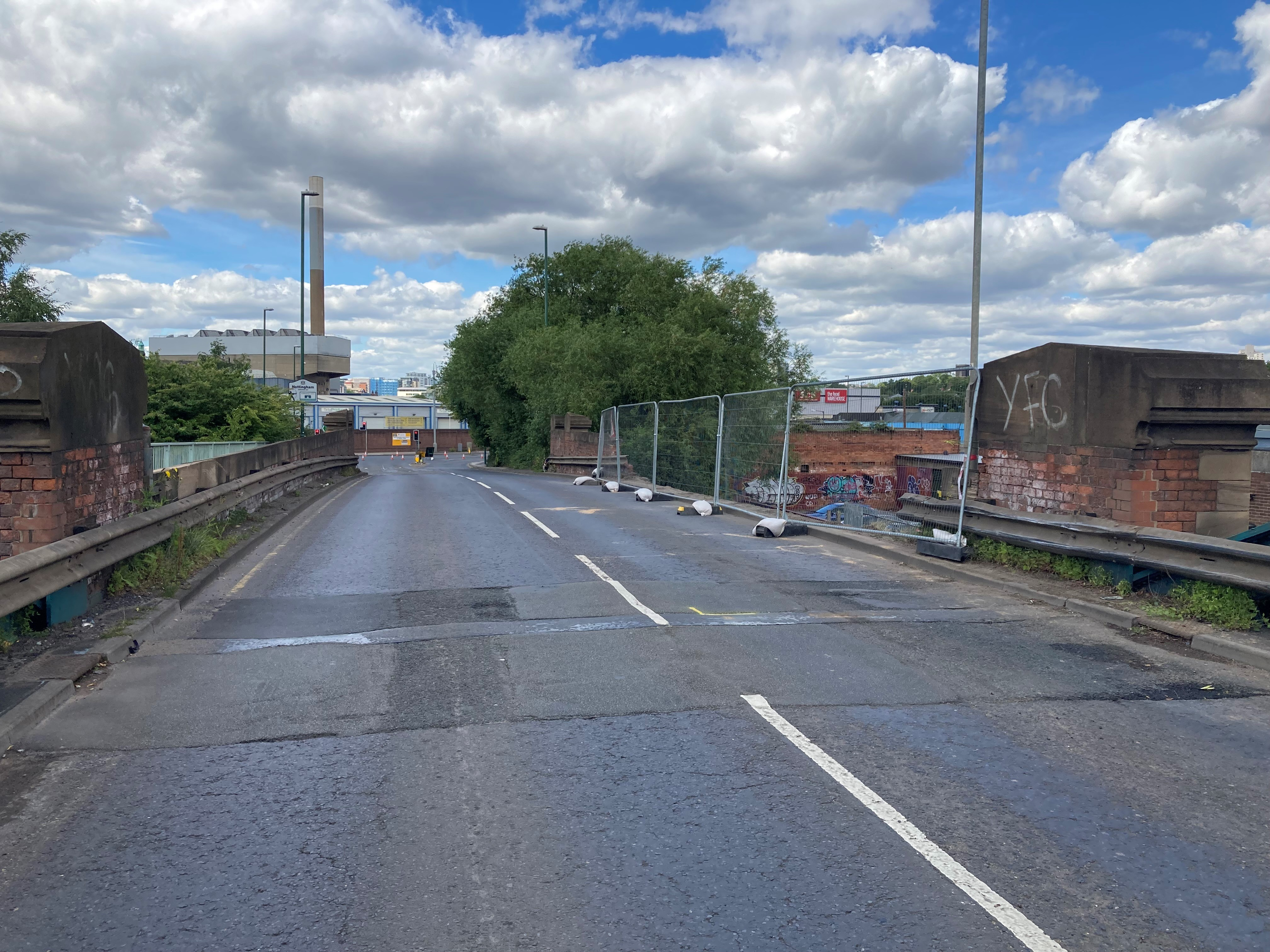
A view of Lady Bay Bridge towards the city of Nottingham following the lorry crash

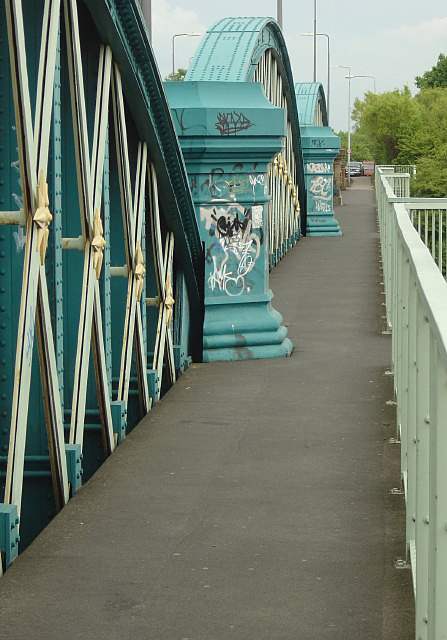
Pedestrian track separated from road traffic

| Next bridge upstream | River Trent | Next bridge downstream |
| Trent Bridge, Nottingham; A60 | Lady Bay Bridge; A6011 | Waterside Bridge; Pedestrian and cycle bridge |

== In popular culture ==
The bridge was used as the location for an East-West Berlin river crossing in the 1982 TV Series Smiley's People, starring Sir Alec Guinness and based on the novel by John le Carre.

== See also ==
- List of crossings of the River Trent
- Nottingham direct line of the Midland Railway
