= The Meadows, Nottingham =

Area of Nottingham, England

The Meadows
- Location within Nottinghamshire
- OS grid reference: SK 57384 38554
- Unitary authority: Nottingham
- Ceremonial county: Nottinghamshire
- Region: East Midlands
- Country: England
- Sovereign state: United Kingdom
- Post town: NOTTINGHAM
- Postcode district: NG2
- Dialling code: 0115
- Police: Nottinghamshire
- Fire: Nottinghamshire
- Ambulance: East Midlands
- UK Parliament: Nottingham South

New Meadows Estate
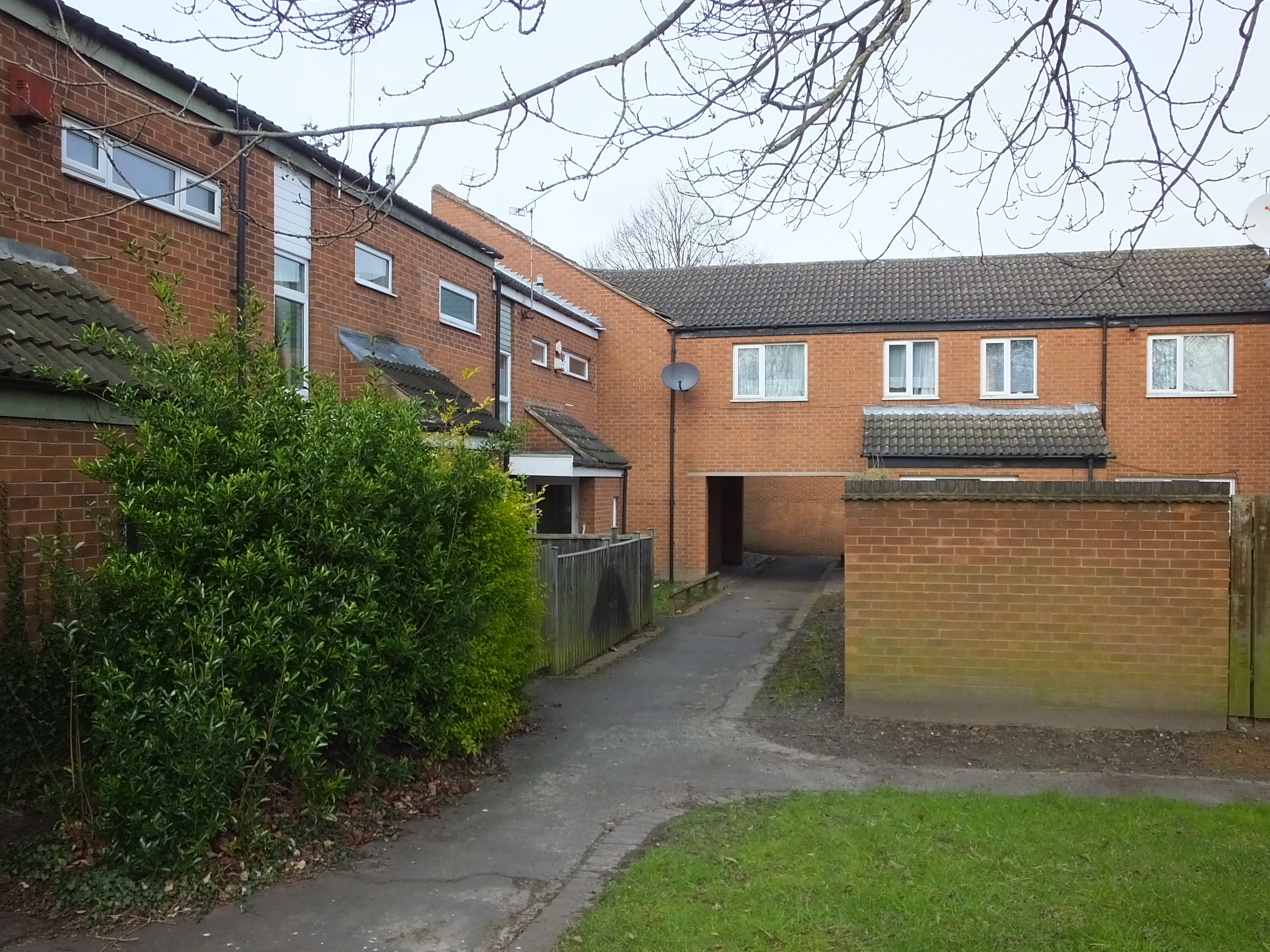
- Radburn style walkways, Manifold Gardens
- Interactive map of New Meadows Estate

General information
- Location: Nottingham, UK
- Status: Stable
- Area: 400 acres (160 ha)
- No. of units: 995

Construction
- Constructed: 1970
- Authority: Nottingham City Council
- Style: Radburn

Refurbishment
- Proposed in: 2009
- Proposed action: Demolish Q-blocks and de-radburnise
- Architect: Taylor Young

The Meadows or Meadows is an area of Nottingham, England, south of the city centre, close to the River Trent and connected to West Bridgford in the Borough of Rushcliffe by Trent Bridge and the Wilford Suspension Bridge. Victoria Embankment runs alongside the River Trent to the south of the Meadows and is home to the Nottingham War Memorial Gardens.

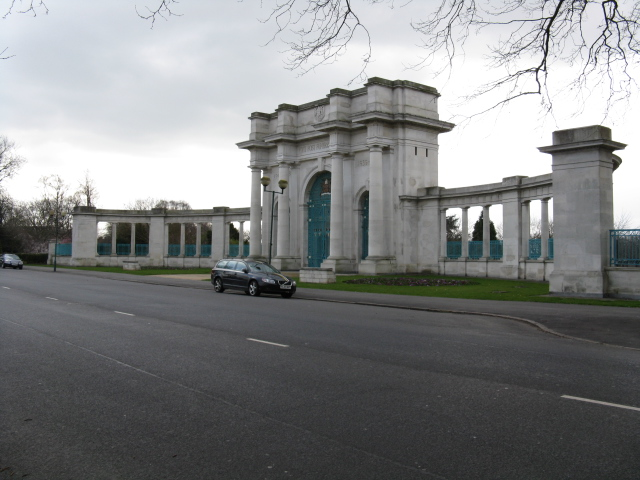
Victoria Embankment War Memorial at Trentside, The Meadows

The Meadows is made up of two distinct areas: the Old Meadows, an area of predominantly pre-1919 privately owned terraced housing laid out in a traditional street pattern, and the New Meadows, an area of mainly social rented housing, built in a Radburn style layout following slum clearance in the late 1970s, and transformed into a more traditional layout after a Private Finance Initiative bid in 2008, by re-establishing vehicular access and reversing the orientation of some of the houses. Unpopular deck-access maisonettes have been demolished. The Community, still re-establishing, has once again been displaced and dispersed after only 40 years.

The area is served by two tram routes and two bus routes, while a dozen more pass along the peripheral roads. It is a short walk to Nottingham railway station. The Bridgeway shopping centre, a pedestrianised shopping precinct located in the centre of the Meadows, provides a focus for community cohesion, but is facing uncertainty about its future.

== Location ==
The Meadows is an area of Nottingham south of the castle and city centre, within the Meadows ward (previously Bridge Ward which also included the Dunkirk area of the city). The Meadows was originally a large area of wetland/floodplain which extended from the River Leen to the River Trent. After enclosure, this area was drained and gradually developed for a variety of uses, incorporating terraced housing, public houses, factories, warehouses and public buildings such as libraries and swimming baths.

To the north it is bounded by the low red sandstone hill of Nottingham City Centre, to the south west, south and east it is bounded by the meandering River Trent; to the north and west by the Beeston and Nottingham Canal. It is separated from the rest of Nottingham by the A60 London Road that runs along the canal bank from Trent Bridge and the A453 Queens Drive/A6019 Queens Road ring road. A local distributor road, Meadows Way, runs in parallel to these roads for their entire length. The embankment of the Great Northern Railway ran to the north.

The Ordnance Survey use the name Meadows (not The Meadows) for the area.

== History ==
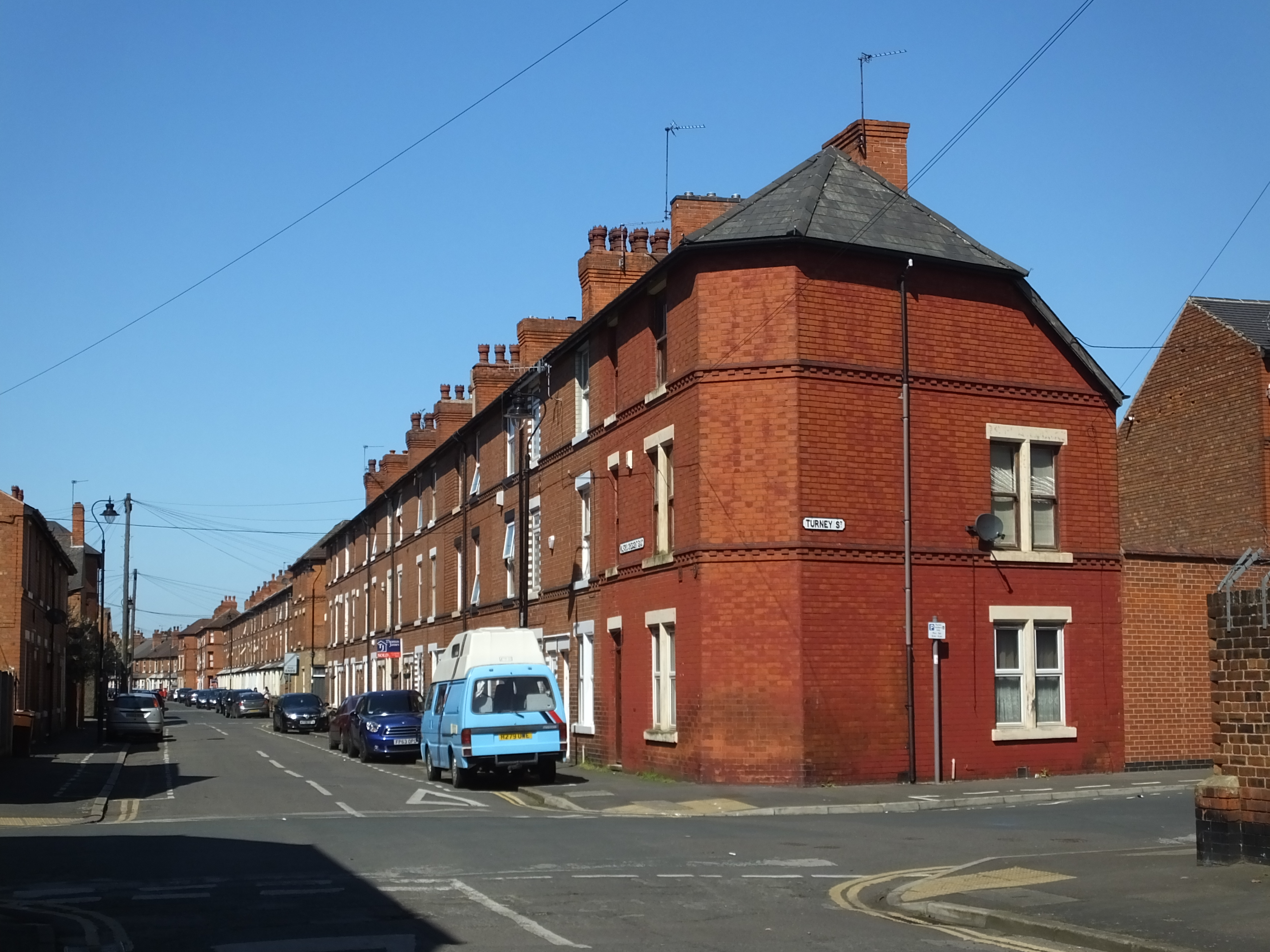
Three storey terraced housing on Wilford Crescent East showing common roof profile

The terraced housing was constructed mainly for those that worked on the railways and in the factories. Many of these houses were built by the railway company themselves. Historic photographs show the area to be a vibrant community with many fine buildings and good townscape.

In 1901, Victoria Embankment, a 1¼ mile long Victorian flood defence engineering works with a promenade and carriage-way opened, along with the New Meadows recreation ground. In 1906 the Arts & Crafts style Cricket Pavilion was officially opened along with several new football pitches with the Police Band in attendance. In 1920, Jesse Boot purchased the remainder of the land within the Embankment adjacent to the Trent and then bequeathed it to the citizens of Nottingham in perpetuity for recreational use and memorial. This included the memorial gardens, playing fields, war memorial (foundation stone laid by Prince of Wales 1923), bandstand (1937) and two sports pavilions, all of which survive today.

=== The 'New Meadows' 1970s redevelopment ===
In the 1970s, housing in the Meadows was deemed unsuitable by the council and a large part of the Meadows was demolished to make way for a new development of modern council housing. The new development was based on the Radburn model of planning which consisted of segregating traffic and pedestrians by constructing cul-de-sacs, feeder roads and underpasses. In 1975, the viaduct carrying the Great Central railway and Arkwright Street station was demolished as the new development started to take shape. Today there is absolutely no trace of any part of the Great Central Railway in the Meadows.

The Radburn model led to anti-social behaviour problems : Nottingham City Council has stated that "the problems associated with the layout of the New Meadows Radburn style layout... contribute to the anti-social behaviour and crime in the area."

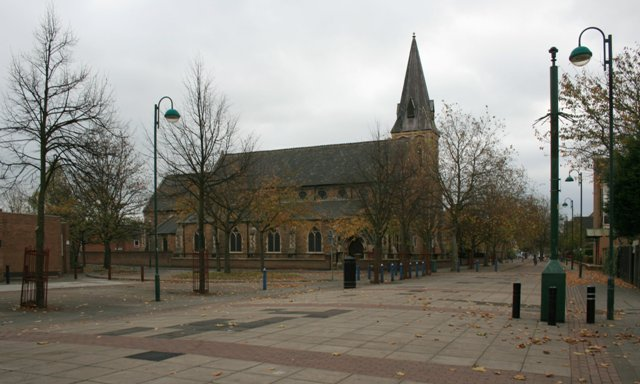
St Saviour's in the Meadows

St Saviour's Church located on Arkwright Walk, by R C Sutton, opened in 1864. It is entered through the south west tower and has a simple west end with lancets. It is one of only a small number of large individual buildings that survived the area's redevelopment in the 1970s. However, the 'Old Meadows', a substantial area to the south of Wilford Crescent (East and West), running to the Trent Embankment, survives as a reminder of what was lost.

=== Meadows neighbourhood plan and post 2009 reconstruction ===
In 2009, Nottingham City Council commissioned the consultants Taylor Young to examine the problems facing the Meadows, as a precursor to putting in a bid for Round 6 Housing PFI funding. They were awarded £200 million to implement the plan, which was promptly withdrawn by the incoming Cameron coalition government.

Taylor Young identified major issues and set up the Community Transformation Working Group to work with residents. (Note: The issues were condensed into: improving accessibility into, out of and through the area; providing greater housing choice; investing in community assets; creating a sustainable eco-neighbourhood; tackling worklessness; and combatting crime and anti-social behaviour) The Meadows Neighbourhood Plan was developed over two years and resulted in a detailed document including: a baseline review highlighting the issues; a vision for the future; option appraisal; consultation and engagement; and detailed descriptions of the preferred plan and options for delivery.

During the initial stage, the plans involved completely redesigning the New Meadows area by reintroducing the traditional street layout in contrast to the maze of alleyways, subways and cul-de sacs that currently exist since the area was last redeveloped in the 1970s. The council anticipated that this would have had a positive impact by reducing crime and anti-social behaviour and providing easy access in and out of the area for the police. The plans also included a new local shopping centre which was to be created by demolishing the current Bridgeway Centre and constructing the new one along a recreated 'Arkwright Street' located slightly east of the current shopping area.

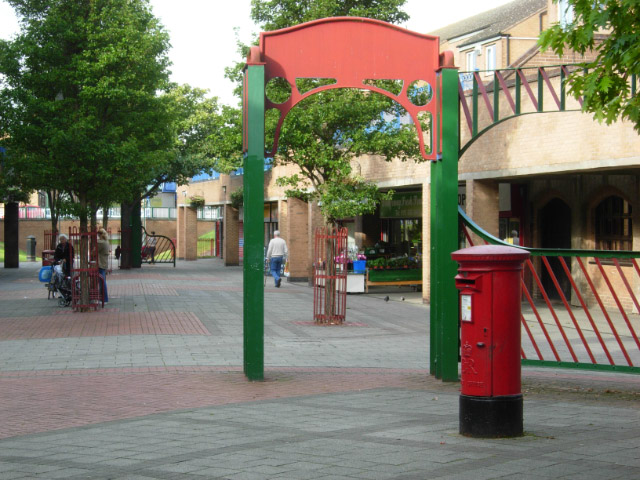
Bridgeway Shopping Centre in 2007

In order to achieve the desired traditional street layout the council planned to 'turn around' many houses and demolish many of the 'Q' blocks and replace them with modern energy-efficient family homes in reflection of the area's desire to become an eco-friendly neighbourhood.

During November 2010, the government announced that, as part of its austerity package, the £200 million PFI grant to redevelop the neighbourhood was cancelled. However, the city council continued with a more limited scheme and funding for the construction of the tram extensions and the redevelopment of Nottingham railway station came from another source.

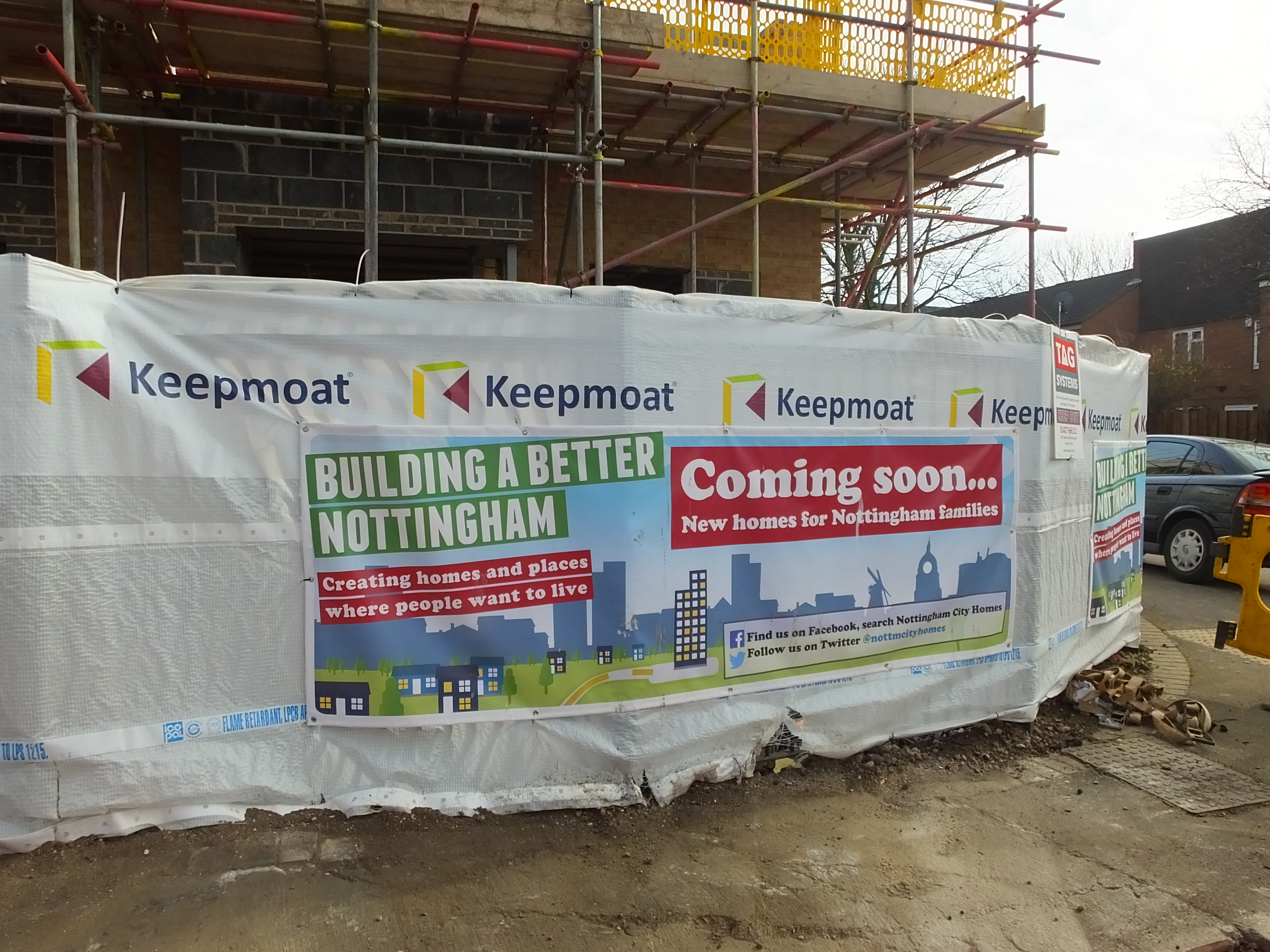
New builds on the site of the Cromarty Court, Q-block in 2016

In September 2011, Nottingham City Homes (NCH) announced that fifteen of the 'Q' blocks, principally around the Arkwright Walk area, were to be decommissioned along with a small number of other properties. Nottingham City Homes manages 28,000 homes across the city and planned to decommission or demolish about 1000 of the least sustainable. The 'Q' blocks were four storey deck access maisonettes that were unpopular with residents and the police. The scheme was in phases, the final phase to be completed in 2016, involving demolishing houses to re-establish the line of Arkwright Street as a principal thoroughfare, open to buses and local traffic. Arkwright Walk/Street links Nottingham Station and Trent Bridge. NCH proposed to develop new family sized housing to replace the demolished properties. Two of the subways in the Meadows have been removed (the Meadows Way underpass which connects Arkwright Walk with Arkwright Street has been replaced with a pedestrian crossing and the underpass which takes Queens Walk under Robin Hood Way filled in.

Under the NCH proposals, the Bridgeway Shopping Centre remains open but lacking traders and requests by residents for further shops along Queens Walk failed to attract any commercial interest.

Early in 2012 a new tram route to Clifton was cut through the Queens Walk. In the main the double row of plane trees from the 1842 plan have been maintained, though 40 trees were lost.

== Victoria Embankment and Memorial Gardens ==
Victoria Embankment and the Memorial Gardens lie within a 1.2 mi (2 km) long meander of the River Trent as it runs between Wilford Bridge and Trent Bridge. In the 19th century it was part of the Clifton Estate, and of low value due to regular inundation. The estate donated 9ha to Nottingham Corporation in 1897 to allow flood defences to be built. The Victoria Embankment was built between 1898 and 1901 under the supervision of borough engineer Arthur Brown. It consisted of concrete steps and an earth embankment surmounted with a public carriageway. A public recreation ground was created by levelling and backfilling the land between the embankment and The Meadows estate. The New Meadows Recreation ground was opened in May 1906, replacing a Public Recreation Ground on the east side of Queens Walk, lost to the development of the Great Central railway.

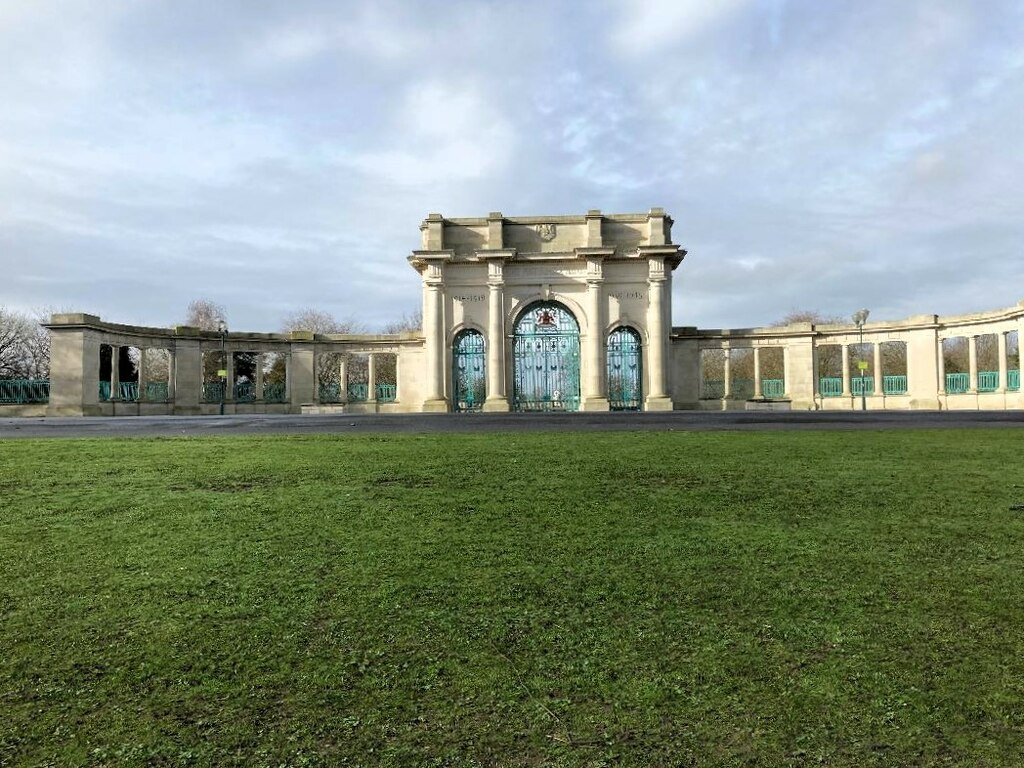
Nottingham War Memorial

In 1920 the Clifton Estate sold 14.7ha of the adjacent land to Sir Jesse Boot who gave it to the Citizens of Nottingham. Boot lived opposite this land on the south bank of the river; New Park was given with the restrictions that it should remain open space in perpetuity. The name New Park has been lost: 2.7ha have been laid out as Memorial Gardens to the dead of World War I. They were laid out by City Engineer and Surveyor, Mr T Wallis Gordon with the Superintendent of the Public Parks, Mr J Parker. The rock gardens and the foundation stone of the Memorial Arch and Terrace were dedicated on 11 November 1926, and the full works were completed 12 May 1937.

The Memorial Garden as a whole is the Civic Memorial, with Remembrance Day Services taking place at the grand gateway entrance, the Triumphant Archway. Nottingham War Memorial 52.934590°N 1.140192°W, a raised terrace, formal gardens with an elaborate cross-shaped ornamental pond, pump room and toilets, and a statue of Queen Victoria. To the south of the gardens is a Grade II listed Art Deco bandstand. in 2011 the Grade 2 Gardens of Historic Interest designation awarded to the Memorial Gardens was extended to include the Bandstand Enclosure. In 2022 the memorial garden underwent a significant renovation.

== Population statistics ==
As of 2003, the Meadows contains 7,870 inhabitants. According to the 2001 census, the population of the Meadows has a high proportion of Mixed, Asian, Asian British, Black and Black British when compared with the national average. 16.3% of residents in the Meadows are aged between 18 and 24 which is higher than the national average of 8.4%. According to the 2004 ODPM report, the Bridge electoral ward of which the Meadows was a part, has one of the highest rates of children affected by income related poverty in the country. In 2005 Nottingham City LEA announced that approximately 45% of children who attend primary schools in the Meadows are eligible for free school meals. The area suffers from low formal educational attainment as the number of five or more GCSEs at grade C or above is below average in comparison to both the national average and the Nottingham City average. A high proportion of adults do not have any formal qualifications according to the ODPM (2004), and as a result the area has a higher than average rate of unemployment. Data collected by Nottingham City's benefits department in 2005 shown that 35% of households in Bridge ward were in receipt of Council Tax Benefit and/or Housing Benefit.

== Governance ==
The Meadows is in "The Meadows" Ward of Nottingham City Council. It is represented as of May 2023 by two Labour Party Councillors, Councillor Eunice Regan and Councillor Michael Edwards.

== Transport ==
=== Rail services ===
The Great Central Railway ran through the area on its route from Nottingham to London and had an intermediate station in the Meadows known as Nottingham Arkwright Street. However, due to the Beeching Report, conducted to assess the cost effectiveness of several railway lines and stations across Britain, the Great Central line along with Arkwright Street station was recommended for closure in 1963. However, the line and station remained open up until 1969 before they were eventually permanently closed. The line passed from Arkwrght Street, through the Bridgeway centre and on a route roughly parallel to Queens Walk, 120m to the east. It crossed the Trent and continued on the city boundary into West Bridgford. The NET tram uses a replacement bridge for the former GCR bridge over Nottingham Station, and the track alignment south of the river.

=== Tram services ===
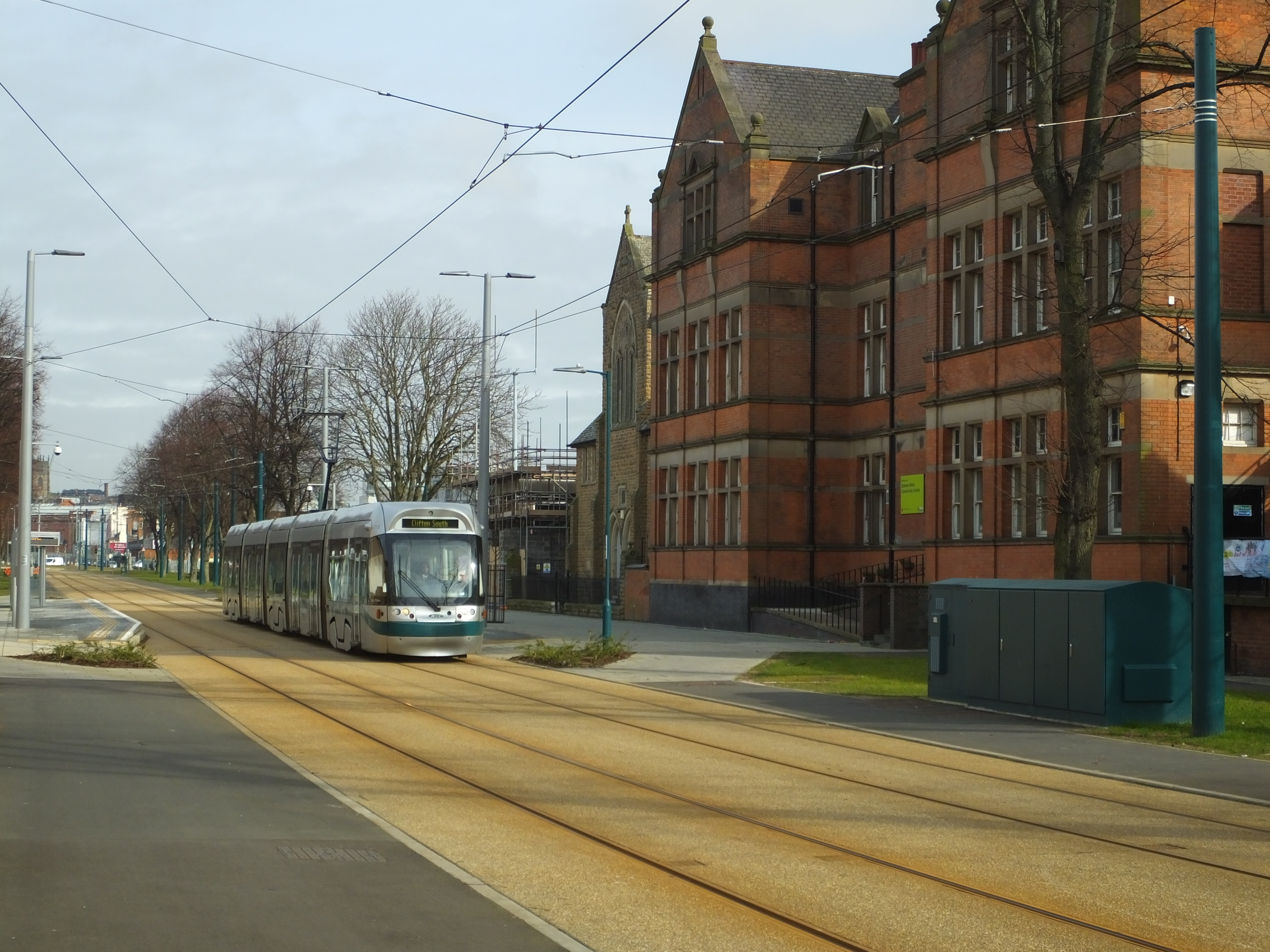
The Queens Walk NET tram-stop with a tram heading to Clifton South

The Meadows is served by several stops of the Nottingham Express Transit system, now that the system's phase two is in operation (25 August 2015). Both line 1, to Beeston and Chilwell, and line 2, to Wilford and Clifton, pass through the Meadows. The stops within the Meadows are:

- Meadows Way West (line 1)
- Queens Walk (line 2)
- Meadows Embankment (line 2)

Additionally NG2 (line 1) and Nottingham Station (line 1 and 2) tram stops are nearby.

=== Bus services ===
Meadows Way East and Victoria Embankments

Nottingham City Transport: 1, 1A, 1B, 1E, 3, 3A, 4, 5, 6, 7, 8, 9, 10, 10C, 10X, N4

Trentbarton: The Cotgrave, The Keyworth, Mainline, Rushcliffe Villager.

Other services: 9 (Kinchbus), 90 (Vectare)

Bridgeway Centre, Wilford Grove and Bathley Street

Nottingham City Transport: 11, 11A, 11C

Bridgeway Centre and Robin Hood Way

Nottingham City Transport: 48, 48X

Queens Drive

Nottingham City Transport: 49, 49A, 49B, 49X

== See also ==
- St George in the Meadows, Nottingham
- St Saviours in the Meadows, Nottingham
- St Ann's, Nottingham
- Arkwright Street railway station
