= 1683 Trent flood =

Natural disaster in England

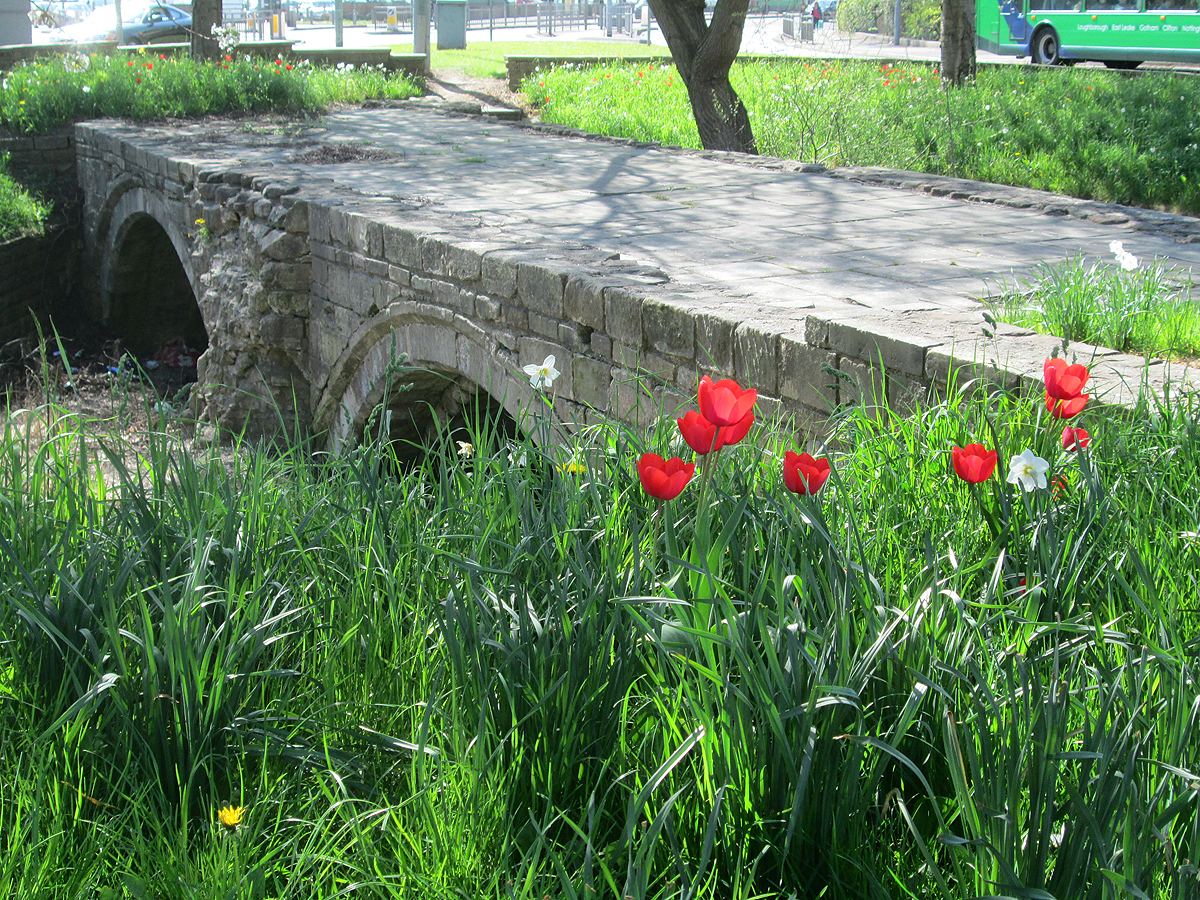
Surviving arches of the old Trent Bridge

The River Trent valley in Nottinghamshire, England, suffered from a major flood in 1683. The floods followed a lengthy cold period and were formed from melting snow and broken river ice. The ice floes swept away much of Hethbeth or Trent Bridge at Nottingham and the Town Bridge at Newark-on-Trent.

== Description ==
The floods followed a lengthy cold period with freezing weather lasting from September 1682 until February 1683. Nottinghamshire suffered regular and heavy snowfalls during this period. The thawing of snow and breaking up of river ice caused significant flooding on 5 and 6 February, affecting the entire Trent valley.

At this time the Hethbeth or Trent Bridge at Nottingham consisted of more than twenty stone piers covered by a wooden deck. The bridge was badly damaged by ice floes moving down the river and much of the northern half was swept away.

Downstream at Newark-on-Trent the Town Bridge was also swept away and the riverside fields flooded. The damage at nearby Holme, Nottinghamshire, and North Muskham, Lincolnshire, was witnessed by Thomas Winnard who composed a poem beginning "when heirs and widows hoarding fresh supplies/Bottle up tears wrung from St. Swithin's eyes", Swithin being the patron saint of weather.

== Aftermath ==
The Nottingham Corporation appointed a committee to rebuild the bridge. The work, carried out in 1684, installed stone arches. The number of spans in the river was reduced to 15, over a distance of around 538 feet (164 m); when taken with an adjacent roadway support structure and two flood-relief arches the overall length was 205 metres (673 ft), somewhat shorter than the structure it replaced. . The piers of the first five arches, and possibly a further two, were rebuilt completely as part of the works. The remaining piers, which had been rebuilt around the time of the English Civil Wars, were judged to be in satisfactory condition. Two arches from the 1683 reconstruction survive in a modern traffic island near the bridge, which was demolished and rebuilt from 1871.

Newark's Town Bridge had been rebuilt by 1700 with a wooden deck spanning the surviving stone piers.
