= Clifton Bridge (Nottingham) =

Bridge in Nottinghamshire, England

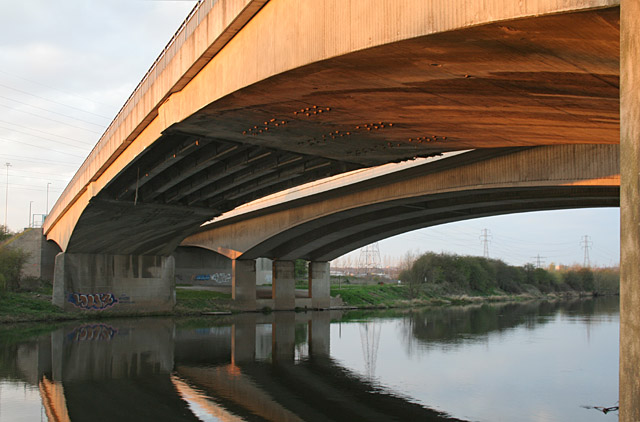
- Clifton Bridge from the south bank of the River Trent
- Coordinates: 52°55′30.4″N 1°09′57.1″W
- Carries: A52
- Crosses: River Trent

Characteristics
- Design: Twin Concrete Arch Bridge
- Total length: 275ft

History
- Opened: 5 June 1958

Clifton Bridge is a road bridge spanning the River Trent and carrying the A52 road to the west of the city of Nottingham, in the county of Nottinghamshire, England.

It was completed and opened to traffic in March 1958 and is constructed of pre-stressed concrete. It is the next upstream road crossing from the older famous Trent Bridge. Clifton Bridge was initially built to relieve traffic pressures on Trent Bridge.

The current west bridge over the Trent at Clifton Bridge includes a section of the former B680 (which followed the route into Nottingham now used by the A453). The 275 ft bridge was formally opened on 5 June 1958 by Princess Alexandra, The Honourable Lady Ogilvy. At the time it was the longest pre-stressed concrete bridge in the country.

With the addition of the east bridge the crossing became dual-carriageway as the A614 as part of a 1 1/4-mile (2.0 km) £3.2 million section (equivalent to £53,327,845 in 2023),, opening in 1972. The eight lane bridge is a part of major regional route linking Derby and Grantham as well as serving local traffic in Nottingham.

The bridge is also open to segregated pedestrian and cycle traffic.

In 1994 a survey revealed corrosion damage to up to 25% of the pre-stressing wires. The bridge was strengthened by post-stressing with additional external cables.

In February 2020 during routine maintenance work, it was discovered that water damage had corroded steelwork under the bridge. This caused a temporary closure of the east bridge, which carries all eastbound traffic and one lane of westbound traffic, while the bridge was repaired. By the end of 2021, repairs had been fully completed, allowing the bridge to be fully reopened to all road traffic.

Next road crossing upstream	River Trent	Next road crossing downstream
Harrington Bridge; B6540	Clifton Bridge; A52	Trent Bridge; A60
Next bridge upstream	River Trent	Next bridge downstream
Trent Viaducts	Clifton Bridge; A52	Wilford Toll Bridge

== General references ==
Finch, RM; Goldstein, A (March 1959). Clifton Bridge, Nottingham: Initial Design Studies & Model Test. Vol. 12. Inst. of Civil Engineers.
