= Trent Bridge (bridge) =

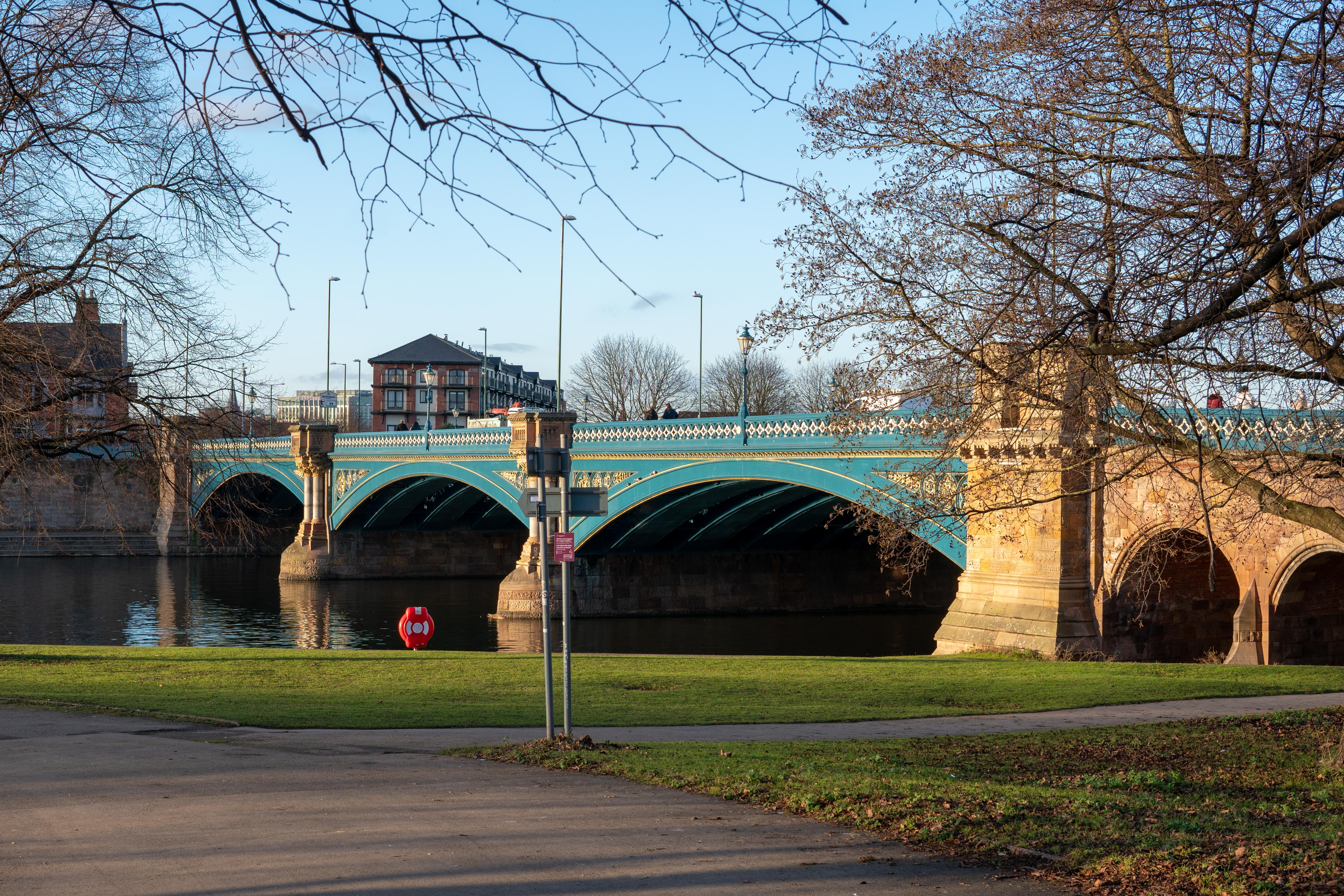
- View of Trent Bridge from the bank of the River Trent, West Bridgford
- Coordinates: 52°56′18.4″N 1°08′10.9″W
- Carries: Road traffic ( A60 , single carriageway)
- Crosses: River Trent
- Locale: Nottingham, Nottinghamshire, England
- Heritage status: Grade II listed

Characteristics
- Material: Iron and stone
- Width: 40 feet (12 m)
- Longest span: 100 feet (30 m)

History
- Designer: Marriott Ogle Tarbotton
- Constructed by: Andrew Handyside and Company
- Construction start: 1868
- Construction end: 1871

Location
- Interactive map of Trent Bridge

Trent Bridge is an iron and stone road bridge across the River Trent in Nottingham, England. It is the principal river crossing for entrance to the city from the south, although the upstream Clifton Bridge is both larger and busier.

== History ==
=== Medieval bridge ===
The first bridge is thought to have been constructed on the site in 920. A second bridge which was started in 1156 had more than 20 stone arches and a chapel dedicated to St. James at one end. It was maintained by a religious organisation. On 21 February 1551 the responsibility for repair passed to Nottingham Corporation, through a royal charter which created the Bridge Estate.

It was known as Hethbeth bridge, Heath-beth bridge, or Heck-beck bridge.

This bridge was damaged by floods several times, and the northern half was washed away during floods in 1683. The repaired bridge had fifteen arches across the river and flood areas, giving openings covering 347 ft in a total length of 538 ft. Although it was repaired, the foundations had become unsafe and a project to replace it was started in the 1860s.

=== Modern bridge ===
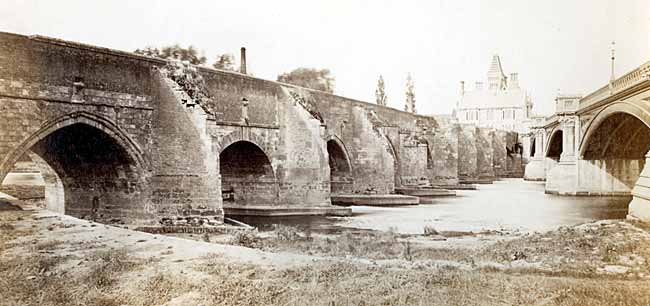
Old and new bridges pictured together in 1871

The bridge was designed by Marriott Ogle Tarbotton. Construction started in 1868 and was completed in 1871 by Derbyshire iron maker, Andrew Handyside. The general contractor was Benton and Woodiwiss of Derby. It was completed for a cost of £30,000 (equivalent to £3,060,000 as of 2025). There were three main cast iron arch spans each 100 feet (30 m) braced by wrought iron girders. The width between the parapets was 40 feet (12 m). It is a Grade II listed building. The carving on the bridge was executed by Mawer and Ingle of Leeds.

The new Trent Bridge formed part of a series of works along the banks of the river to improve flood defences by the construction of stepped, stone embankments.

Between 1924 and 1926 the bridge was widened to 80 ft by the Cleveland Bridge & Engineering Company.

== Bridge Estate ==
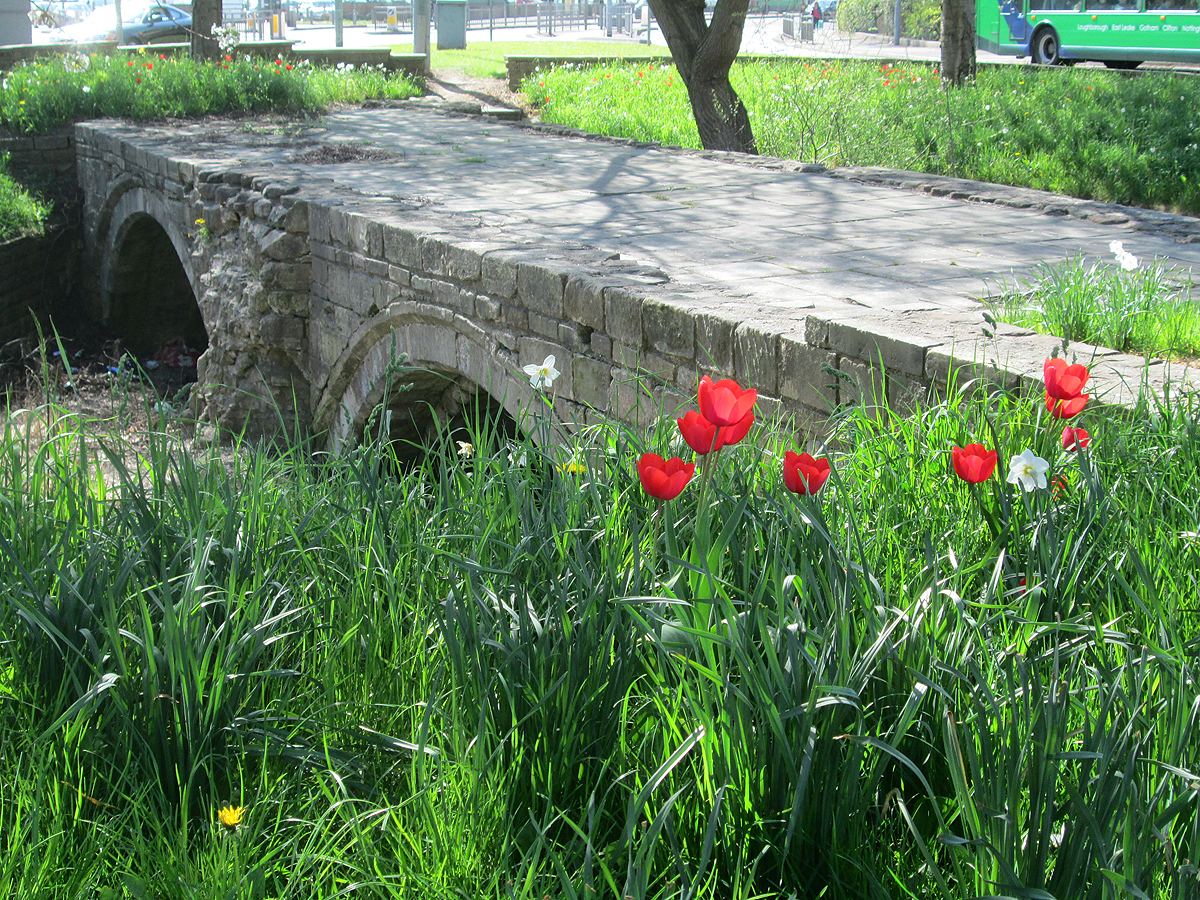
Two arches from the old bridge are still preserved on the south bank of the river .

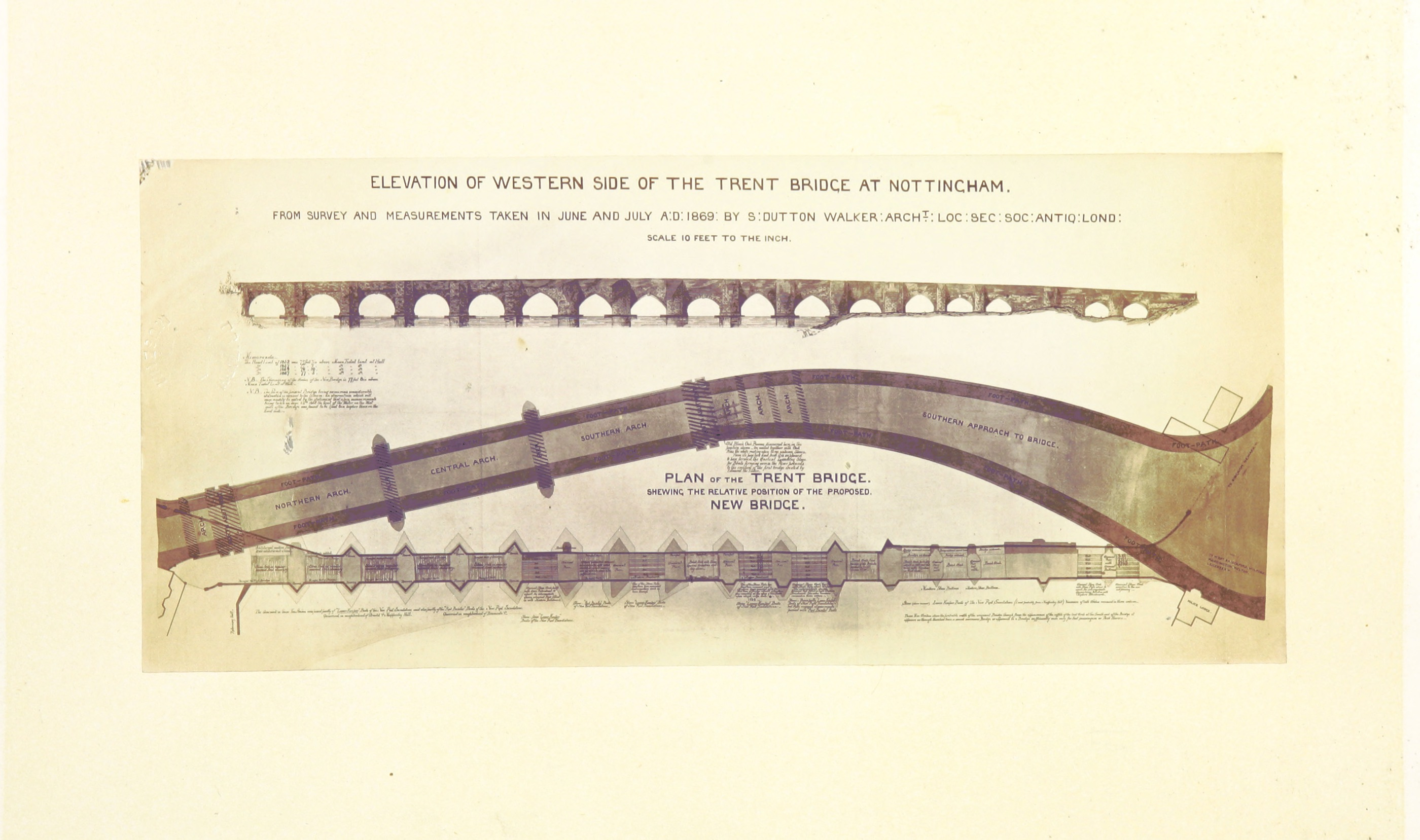
Plan showing proposed position of the new bridge relative to the old bridge (1869)

The Bridge Estate was created by a royal charter of King Edward VI on 21 February 1551 with Nottingham Corporation as trustee. The objective was to provide funds to maintain and repair the bridge.

In 1882 the funds exceed the requirement of the objective, and three new objectives were agreed:

- Provide for the efficient maintenance and repair of Trent Bridge and the approaches to it.
- To set up a contingency fund for the possible construction of such new bridge or bridges over the River Trent as may be found necessary or desirable.
- The residue of such income is to be applied as the trustee thinks best for the improvement of the City of Nottingham and the public benefit of its inhabitants.

In 1945 the Bridge Estate was registered as charity 220716 with the Charity Commissioners.

== Flood marks ==
Floods levels at Trent Bridge
Rank	Date	Level at Trent Bridge	
		m	ft
1	February 1795	24.55	80.5
2	October 1875	24.38	80.0
3	March 1947	24.30	79.7
4	November 1852	24.26	79.6
5	February 1946	24.10	79.1
6	January 1901	24.09	79.0
7	May 1932	24.04	78.9
8	December 1910	24.01	78.8
9	December 1869	23.81	78.1
10	July 1875	23.81	78.1
11	November 2000	23.80	78.1
12	January 1887	23.69	77.7
13	1857	23.49	77.1
14	March 1864	23.41	76.8
15	Normal Level	20.7	68

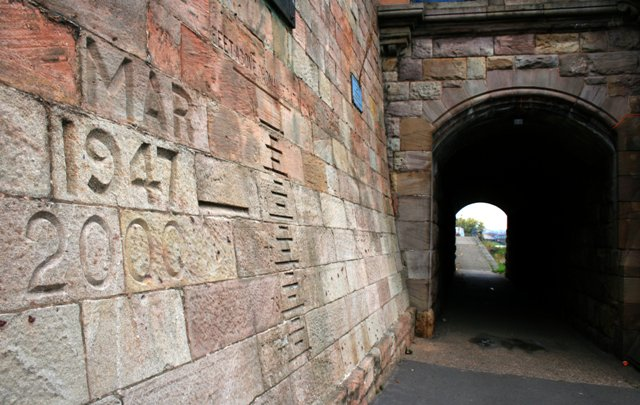
Trent Bridge flood marks

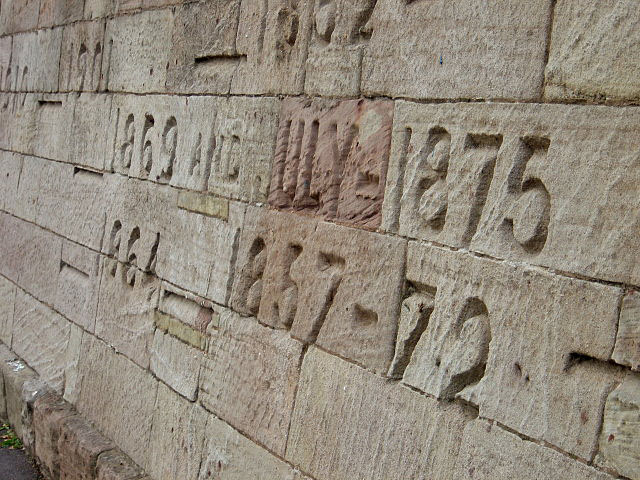
Another view of the Trent Bridge flood marks

On the northern abutment of the bridge, the high water marks reached by floods since 1852 have been carved into the stonework. This practice was started during the period when the Hethbeth bridge still existed, and those earlier marks were transferred onto the new bridge. To enable a comparison to be made with the peak levels, a graduated series of heights in feet above sea level has also been added.

The highest flood mark is for the October 1875 flood, but the larger 1795 Candlemas flood, has been attributed with a height at the bridge of 24.55 metres (80.5 ft). Normal water level which is controlled by Holmes Sluices some 4 kilometres (2.5 mi) downstream, is 20.7 metres (68 ft).

== Fame and popular culture ==
The bridge is one of Nottingham's most famous landmarks and sits at the heart of Nottingham's sporting district. The bridge lends its name to the nearby Nottinghamshire County Cricket Club Trent Bridge stadium, one of England's biggest and most famous cricket grounds. Nottingham Forest FC's City Ground stadium and Notts County FC's Meadow Lane stadium are nearby. The bridge has also been used in as the backdrop for the regional BBC East Midlands Today and ITV Central News.

The Riverbank public house overlooks the bridge in its former tollhouse.

In December 2002, the Nottingham Princess river cruise boat crashed into the central column of the bridge when it lost control in strong currents.

Next road crossing upstream	River Trent	Next road crossing downstream
Clifton Bridge (Nottingham); A52	Trent Bridge; A60; Grid reference SK581382	Lady Bay Bridge; A6011
Next footbridge upstream	River Trent	Next footbridge downstream
Wilford Suspension Bridge	Trent Bridge; A60; Grid reference SK581382	Lady Bay Bridge

== See also ==
- List of crossings of the River Trent
- Listed buildings in West Bridgford
- Listed buildings in Nottingham (Bridge ward)
