= Wilford Toll Bridge =

Multi use Bridge in Nottingham, England

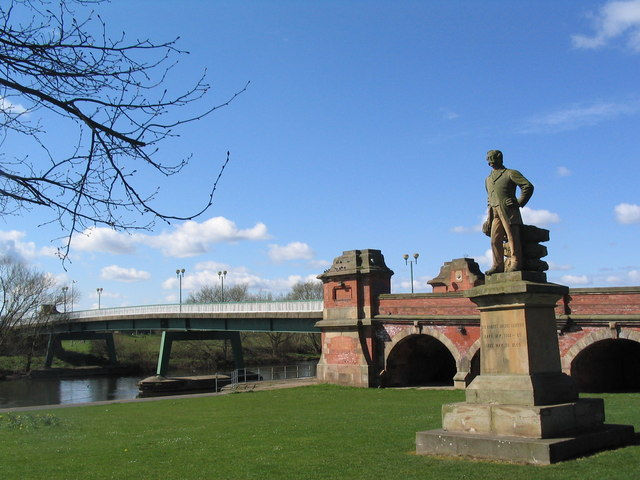
- Wilford Toll Bridge with the statue of Sir Robert Juckes Clifton, 9th Baronet
- Coordinates: 52.9377°N 1.1546°W
- Carries: NET; pedestrians; cycles
- Crosses: River Trent
- Heritage status: Grade II listed structure (part)

History
- Opened: 1906

Location
- Interactive map of Wilford Toll Bridge

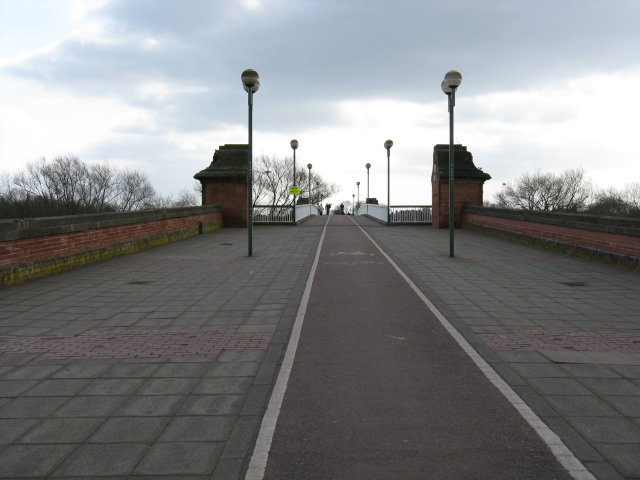
The bridge deck after reopening in 1980 but before widening to carry the tramway

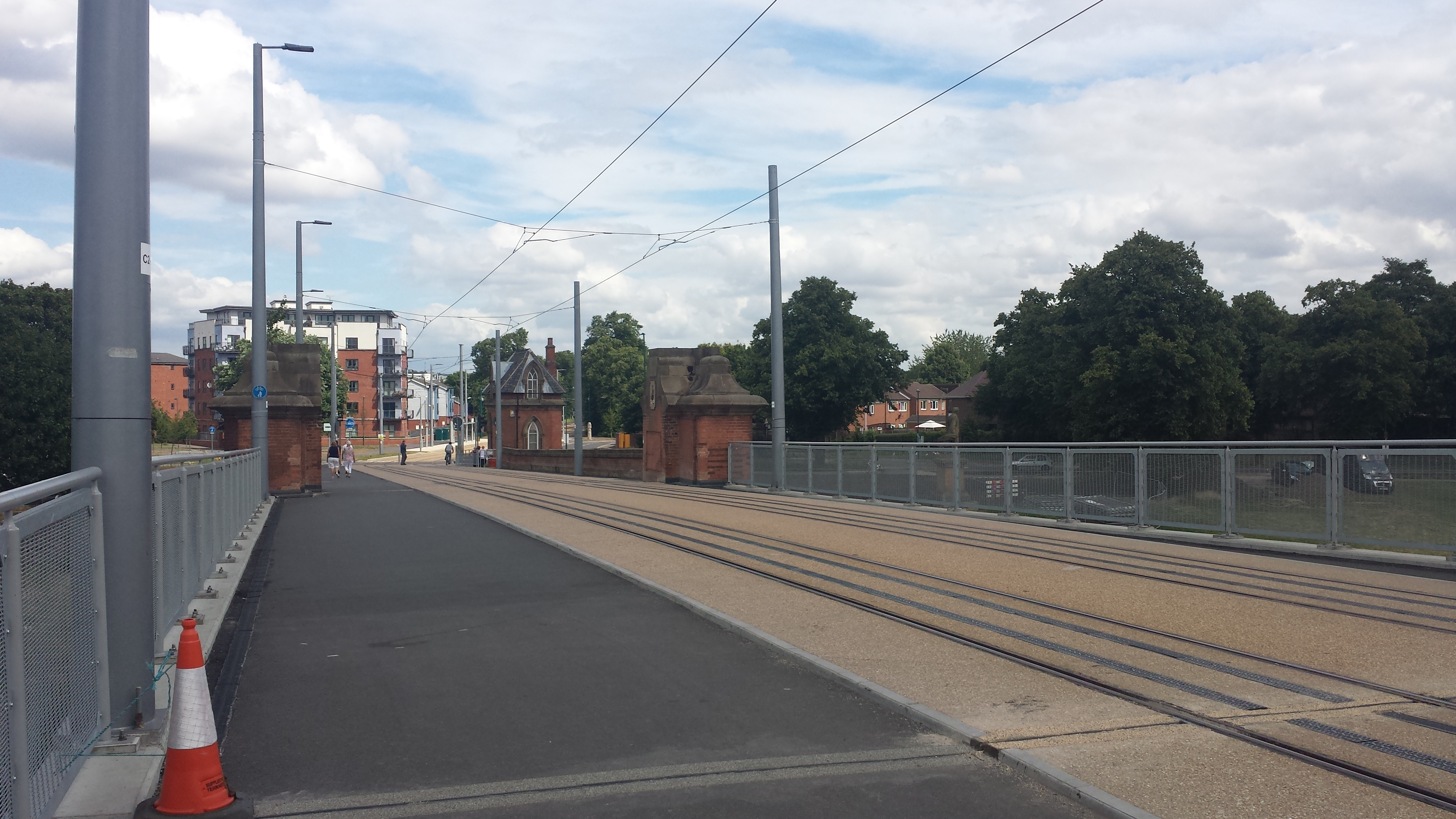
The bridge deck after widening to carry the tramway

Wilford Toll Bridge, locally referred to as the 'Halfpenny Bridge', is a tram, pedestrian and cycle bridge in Nottingham, England. It crosses the River Trent between the Meadows and Wilford. It originally opened as a toll bridge for general traffic in 1870, but was closed when declared unsafe in 1974. Following demolition of the central span, a narrower footbridge and cycleway was opened in 1980. The bridge was once again widened to accommodate an extension of the Nottingham Express Transit network in 2015.

Parts of the northern side of the bridge are Grade II listed building, including the former toll house.

== History ==
=== Wilford Ferry ===
Until the bridge opened a Wilford Ferry was in operation for some 400 years. This ferry was the scene of a disaster in 1784, when in the midst of a gale an overcrowded ferry boat capsized, and six unfortunate passengers were drowned.

Another fatal accident occurred on 10 January 1837 when John Oakley, a Wilford farmer, and two others used another boat which drifted downstream and capsized when it hit the ferry chain.

Wilford Bridge Act 1862 (Note: Section 1.)
- Act of Parliament
- Parliament of the United Kingdom
- Long title: An Act for the making and maintaining of a Bridge over the River Trent near to the Town of Nottingham (to be called "Wilford Bridge"), with Roads thereto, and for the discontinuing of Wilford Ferry across the River, and for other Purposes.
- Citation: 25 & 26 Vict. c. cxvi
- Territorial extent: United Kingdom

Dates
- Royal assent: 30 June 1862
- Commencement: 30 June 1862 (Note: The Acts of Parliament (Commencement) Act 1793.)
- Repealed: 26 September 1985

Other legislation
- Amended by: Wilford Bridge Act 1867
- Repealed by: Nottinghamshire County Council Act 1985

Status: Repealed

Text of statute as originally enacted

Wilford Bridge Act 1867
- Act of Parliament
- Parliament of the United Kingdom
- Long title: An Act to extend the Time limited for the Completion of the Bridge, Roads, and other Works authorized by the "Wilford Bridge Act, 1862;" and for other Purposes.
- Citation: 30 & 31 Vict. c. lxxv
- Territorial extent: United Kingdom

Dates
- Royal assent: 17 June 1867
- Commencement: 17 June 1867
- Repealed: 8 November 1995

Other legislation
- Amends: Wilford Bridge Act 1866
- Repealed by: Statute Law (Repeals) Act 1995

Status: Repealed

Text of statute as originally enacted

An act of Parliament, the Wilford Bridge Act 1862 (25 & 26 Vict. c. cxvi), was obtained for the construction of a bridge. The ferry service ended on 18 September 1864, when a temporary wooden footbridge was opened.

=== Wilford Toll Bridge ===
The toll bridge opened on 16 June 1870. It was built by Sir Robert Juckes Clifton, 9th Baronet, for the traffic for Clifton Colliery. The bridge was a cast-iron structure by Andrew Handyside of Derby.

The toll house was designed by the architect E. W. Hughes. It is built of red brick, ashlar dressing and steep hipped slate/lead roofs, and as of 2019 is used as a sandwich shop.

The bridge was owned by the Clifton family until Nottingham City Council took over responsibility for it in 1969. The piers have the Clifton arms on the inward facing walls.

After a structural assessment revealed that the bridge was in a poor condition, it was closed to traffic in 1974. The centre span was demolished and replaced by a narrower footbridge, of steel girders with an in-situ reinforced concrete deck slab, in 1980. The bridge was then used as a footpath and cycleway, with a gas main and cable services under the deck.

During 2014 and 2015 the bridge was enlarged as part of the works to construct phase 2 of the Nottingham Express Transit system. This involved widening the central portion from 5.65 metres (18.5 ft) to 12.2 metres (40 ft) and strengthening to allow a two-way tram system along with replacement pedestrian and cycle paths.

== Table of tolls ==
On the toll house is a sign which reads:

Table of tolls to be taken under the Wilford Bridge Act 1862. For every horse or other beast drawing any Coach or Stage Coach, Omnibus, Van, Caravan, Sociable, Berlin, Landau, Chaial, A-Vis, Barouche, Phaeton, Chaise Marine, Caleche, Carricle, Chair, Gig, Dog cart, Irish Car, whisky, Hearse, Litter, Chais or any little carriage 6d. For every horse or other beast drawing any wagon, wain, cart or other carriage. 4d. For every horse or mule, laden or unladen not drawing 1½d. For every Ox, Cow, Bull or Neat cattle 1d; or for a score 6d.

== See also ==
- List of crossings of the River Trent

Next bridge upstream	River Trent	Next bridge downstream
Clifton Bridge ( A52 )	Wilford Toll Bridge; Grid reference SK568381	Wilford Suspension Bridge
