= Arthur Brown (engineer) =

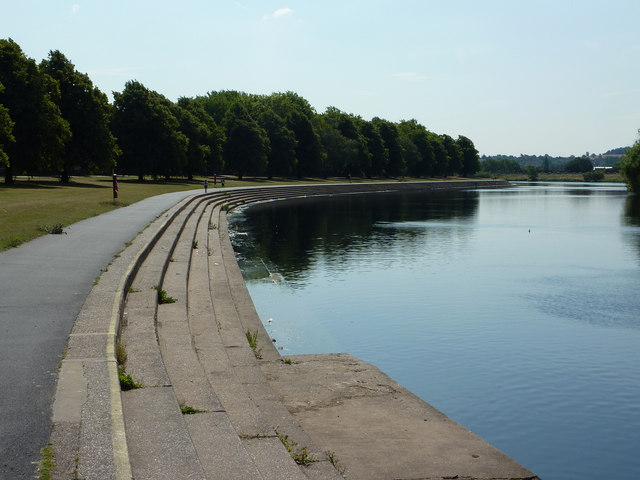
Victoria Embankment, Nottingham, 1898

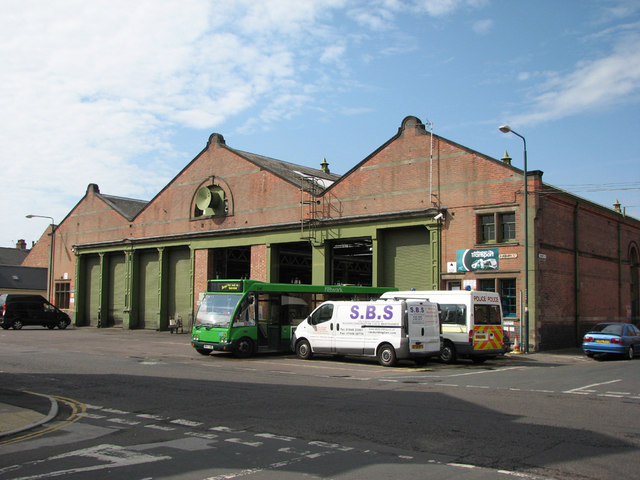
Tramway depot, Bunbury Street, Nottingham, now bus garage, 1901

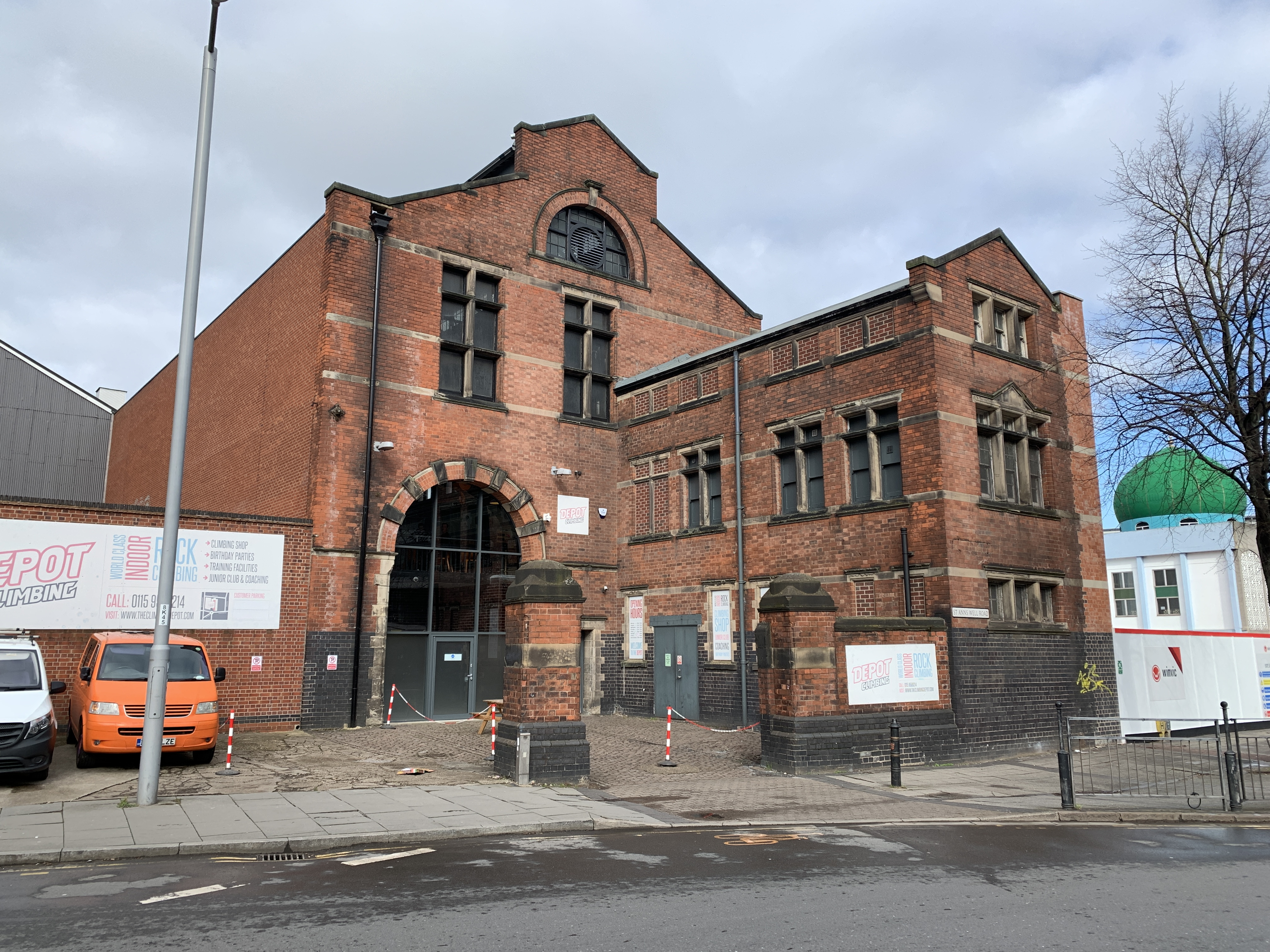
Former power station on St Ann's Well Road (1901-02), now Depot Climbing Nottingham

Arthur Brown M.Inst. C.E. (21 November 1851 - 13 April 1935) was City Engineer for Nottingham, England from 1880 to 1919.

== Life ==
He was born on 21 November 1851 in Nottingham, the son of George Hutchinson Brown a Nottingham merchant. He was educated at Nottingham Grammar School.

On 13 March 1877 at All Saints' Church, Nottingham he married Caroline Goodwin (1854-1919), only daughter of T.A. Goodwin of Nottingham, and they had the following children:

- Lieutenant Arthur Goodwin Brown M.T., A.S.C. (1878-1947)
- Lieutenant Ernest Victor Brown R.G.A. (b.1880)
- Ethel Carrie Brown (b. 1883)
- Winifred M. Brown (1888-1918) (drowned in the sinking of a ship)

For many years he lived in Glenthorne, Lucknow Avenue, Nottingham. He died on 13 April 1935 and left an estate valued at £43,626 (equivalent to £3,825,200 in 2023).

== Career ==
He was articled to the Borough Engineer Marriott Ogle Tarbotton becoming Assistant Borough Engineer in 1874, and succeeded to the role himself in 1880. He retired in 1919.

== Works ==
- Gregory Boulevard, Nottingham 1882-83
- Lenton Boulevard, Nottingham 1882-83
- Radford Boulevard, Nottingham 1882-83
- Beck Valley storm water culvert, St Ann's Well Road, Nottingham 1882-83
- St Peter's Gate churchyard disinterments and improvements 1884
- Cattle Market, London Road, Nottingham 1885
- King Street and Queen Street, Nottingham 1890
- Victoria Park, Nottingham 1894
- Sneinton Baths, Nottingham 1895
- Victoria Embankment, Nottingham 1898
- Construction works for Nottingham Corporation Tramways 1900 onwards
- Talbot Street power station extension 1900
- St Ann's Well Road power station 1901-02 and extension 1919
- Carrington Street bridge, 1904
- Stoke and Bulcote Sewage Farm extension
- Bridge over the Nottingham Canal, Trent Street
- Bridge over the Nottingham Canal, Wilford Street
- Milton Street, Nottingham (widening)
- Bath Street, Nottingham (widening)
- Manvers Street, Nottingham (widening)
- Bulwell Forest Cricket Ground
- Lenton recreation ground
- Wilford Suspension Bridge Nottingham 1906
- Street works depot, Church Street, Basford 1907-08
- Goose Gate, Nottingham, (widening) 1911
- Carlton Road, Nottingham (widening between Thorneywood Lane and the city boundary) 1913
