= Rushcliffe School =

Rushcliffe Spencer Academy
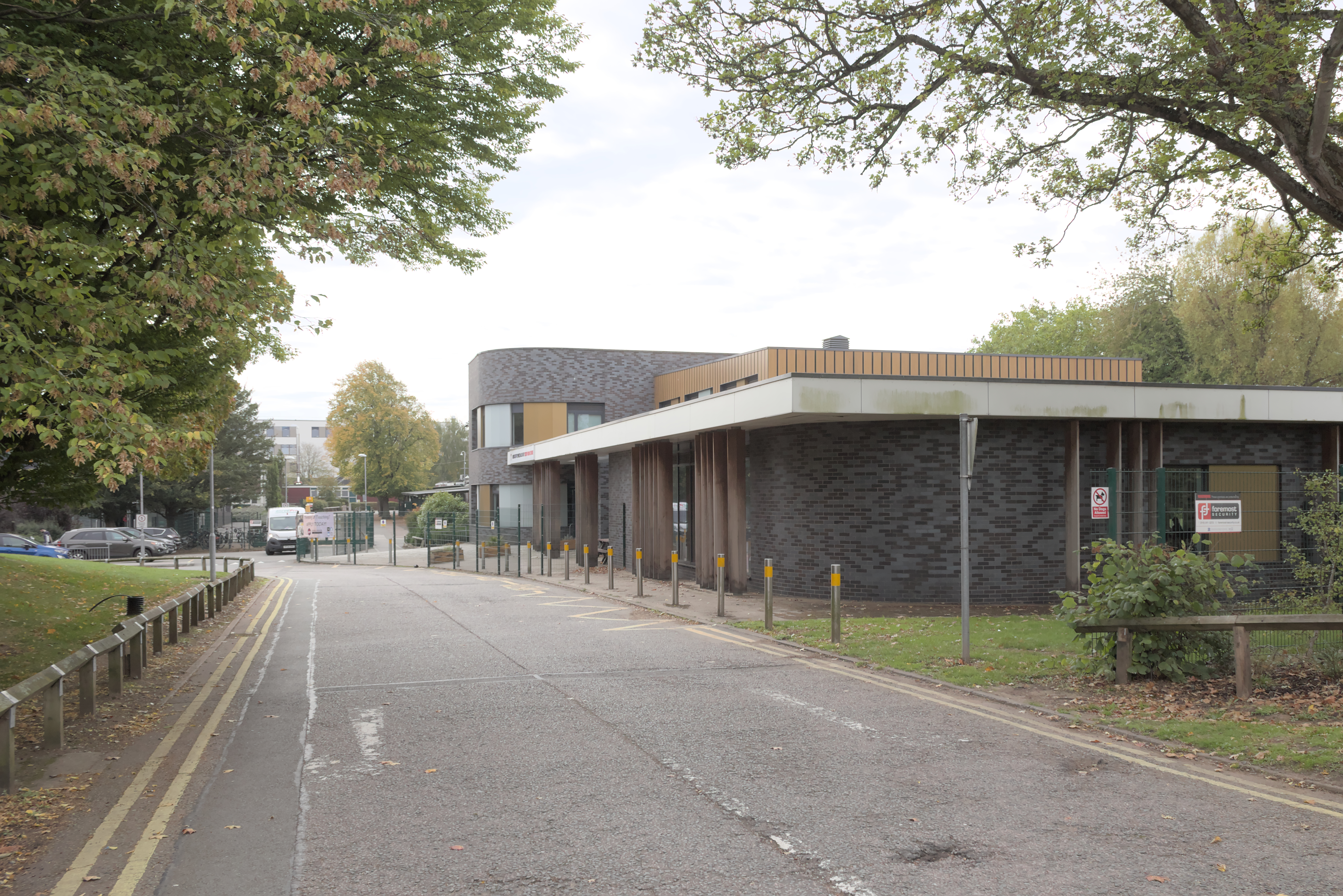

Location
- Rushcliffe Spencer Academy, Boundary Road; West Bridgford, Nottinghamshire, NG2 7BW; England; 52°54′57″N 1°07′31″W

Information
- Type: Academy
- Motto: Latin: Constantia et labore Consistency and effort
- Established: 1961 (grammar school) 1969 (comprehensive school) 2012 (academy)
- Local authority: Nottinghamshire
- Trust: Spencer Academies Trust
- Specialist: Science and Technology
- Department for Education URN: 138482 Tables
- Ofsted: Reports
- Chair of Governors: Vacant
- Executive Principal: G. Smith
- Head of School: S. Sismey
- Gender: Coeducational
- Age: 11 to 18
- Enrolment: 2000
- Colours: Red, Black and Silver
- Website: http://www.rushcliffespencer.com

Rushcliffe Spencer Academy (formerly Rushcliffe School) is a secondary school with academy status in the Rushcliffe district of Nottinghamshire and is situated on Boundary Road in West Bridgford, the administrative centre of the borough of Rushcliffe. It is ranked regularly in the top 100 comprehensive schools in the UK for GCSE results and is in the top 2% of UK comprehensives for A Level results. The School is recognised as Outstanding by Ofsted in all categories.

In late 2015 Rushcliffe School became the 26th school in The UK to earn the World Class Schools Quality Mark, and is the first school in the East Midlands and North of England to win this accolade.

In July 2021, Rushcliffe Spencer Academy was reaccredited with the World Class School Quality Mark.

In August 2021, the academy has changed the name from "Rushcliffe School" to "Rushcliffe Spencer Academy" to join all Spencer Academies brand within the trust.

== History ==
=== Technical schools ===
To form a possible new Rushcliffe Technical Grammar School, to extend the former Musters Road County Secondary School was not possible, in order to make a new three-form secondary technical school, so a site of 30-34 acres was chosen next to the nearby grammar school instead, in January 1947. The boys school opened in 1961 - the girls school in 1962.

=== Comprehensive school ===
The school opened in September 1969. The local education area was re-organised, and the Rushcliffe Boys' Technical Grammar School and Rushcliffe Girls' Technical Grammar School, both on Boundary Road since 1961, were merged.

In April 2011, Rushcliffe School adopted Foundation Status. The school became an academy in August 2012.

In March 2014, Rushcliffe School was graded outstanding in all categories in an Ofsted report.

It was part of the "Trent Academies Group" alongside Arnold Hill Academy and The Farnborough Academy prior to the merger with Spencer Academies Trust in September 2018.

In 2016, Rushcliffe School was one of only eight schools nationally to be nominated for the TES school of the year.

In May 2018, Phil Crompton retired as Executive Head Teacher and Steve Lewis replaced him overseeing Rushcliffe School and Farnborough Academy, while Damian Painton became Head of School at Rushcliffe.

In September 2018, Rushcliffe School and the rest of the Trent Academies Group merged with the Spencer Academies Trust.

In May 2025, Rushcliffe Spencer Academy was again graded outstanding in all categories in an Ofsted report.

== Identity ==
The main colours are red, black, and silver, found not only on the uniform but around the older blocks themselves.

The School's motto is "Constantia et Labore", meaning consistency and effort. This is reflected in the concept of "The Rushcliffe Way" which states the values the school holds, all students are expected to know it. The schools ethos is that "everyone at Rushcliffe school will be given the chance to shine brightly".

== Admissions ==
The school has a specialism in science and is a training school. It admits pupils from eleven to eighteen. Pupils from primary schools in Ruddington, West Bridgford, Gamston, Edwalton and Lady Bay usually go to the school.

== Facilities ==
It has two sports halls, multiple halls and a 5-acre (20,000 m^{2}) field. There is a dining hall in C Block, which replaced the pupil-named EATZ. The former Eatz dining block was opened in 2010 by former Nottingham Forest player Guy Moussi, and the mayor of Rushcliffe. The school has over eight computer rooms. It has five blocks: A Block, B Block, C Block, the Performing Arts and Languages Block, as well as the Sixth Form Block.

Boundary Road connects Loughborough Road (A60) to Melton Road (A606), and is in the far south of the West Bridgford area. Rushcliffe Leisure Centre was part of the school, until its demolition to make way for C Block. The Notts Gymnastic Centre used to be part of the former Rushcliffe Leisure Centre, but since 2024 now stands alone as its own building.

== Headteachers ==
- (Rushcliffe Technical Grammar school for Boys – Dr Bateman)

(Rushcliffe Technical Grammar School for Girls - Miss E M Crabtree)

- Dr Littlejohns (1969–?)
- Mr Cooper (?–1982)
- Mr Chambers(1982–1997)
- Mr Gullis (1997–2010)
- Mr Crompton (2010–2013)
- Mr Lewis (2013–2018) - Rushcliffe School
- Mr Painton (2018–2023) - Rushcliffe Spencer Academy
- Mr Smith (Executive Principal) & Ms Sismey (Head of School) (2024–2025)
- Ms Sismey (2026-Present)

== Notable former pupils ==
- Arvin Appiah - footballer. formerly of Nottingham Forest F.C., currently playing for UD Almería
- Giles Barnes - footballer, Jamaican International, currently playing for Orlando City SC.
- Tendayi Darikwa - footballer, currently playing for Wigan Athletic.
- Becky Downie - British gymnast, Commonwealth champion at uneven bars. 2008 and 2016 Olympian and 2012 reserve
- Ellie Downie - British gymnast, Winner of the 2015 BBC Young Sports Personality of the Year 2016 Olympian, 2017 European all around champion
- Jenny Gunn - cricketer, plays cricket for England women's cricket team
- Dan Jarvis - Labour MP for Barnsley Central, Mayor of the Sheffield City Region
- Brennan Johnson - footballer, currently plays for Everton and Wales National Football Team. Son of former footballer David Johnson.
- David Lloyd (broadcaster), who set up Lincs FM, and former HRLP for BBC East Yorkshire and Lincolnshire from April to May 2009
- Jacob Mellis - footballer, formerly of Chelsea F.C..
- Anne-Marie Minhall – broadcaster, Classic FM.
- Adam Newbold - footballer, formerly of Nottingham Forest F.C.
- Victoria Newton - former deputy editor of The Sun, current editor of The Sun on Sunday – her father Don was deputy headmaster.
- Sam Oldham - British gymnast – Bronze medalist at the 2012 Summer Olympics
