= Wattbike =

British manufacturer of exercise bikes

Wattbike Limited
- Founded: 2008; 18 years ago
- Headquarters: West Bridgford, UK
- Products: Wattbike Atom
- Owner: Interactive Strength Inc.
- Number of employees: 64 (2020)
- Website: wattbike.com

Wattbike is a British manufacturer of exercise bikes since 2008. The company is sited in West Bridgford, near Ruddington Lane tram stop in Compton Acres.

In September 2020, it received £11.5 million from Piper, a UK-based investment company, following an increase in sales caused by the COVID-19 pandemic. The following year, the firm partnered with the All Blacks to supply their indoor bike trainers.

On July 1, 2025, Interactive Strength Inc. announced that it had completed the acquisition of Wattbike.
