= Compton Acres =

Housing development in Nottinghamshire, England

Coordinates: 52°55′00″N 1°09′07″W

- Location within Nottinghamshire
- Interactive map of Compton Acres
- OS grid reference: SK 57042 36016
- District: Rushcliffe
- Shire county: Nottinghamshire
- Region: East Midlands
- Country: England
- Sovereign state: United Kingdom
- Post town: NOTTINGHAM
- Postcode district: NG2
- Dialling code: 0115
- Police: Nottinghamshire
- Fire: Nottinghamshire
- Ambulance: East Midlands
- UK Parliament: Rushcliffe

Compton Acres is a housing development located to the south west of West Bridgford, Nottinghamshire, England, on the rural-urban fringe. Compton Acres also borders with the villages of Ruddington and Wilford. Most of the estate was built in the 1990s.

The name Compton Acres is taken from a garden in Poole, Dorset. Many of the streets are named after areas in Dorset, or trees.

The architecture of the area is typical for houses of its age, mostly being neo-Tudor or neo-Victorian. The district centre is Compton Acres Shopping Centre, which has a variety of general stores including a small Tesco supermarket and several restaurants. Further up Compton Acres is The Apple Tree pub. There were plans for a large Sainsbury's superstore on the site of the old Chateau public house, between The Becket School and the "Roko" gym, but these have been withdrawn and the land sold to the supermarket chain Lidl. On this site there is now a large car park with a Lidl, PureGym, Indigo Sun (tanning salon), Starbucks and a fish and chip shop; this was opened on 24th February 2022 and nearby is a new Aldi, opened November 2023. Linden Homes have built 170 new houses on a floodplain between "Roko" and the new Rushcliffe Arena on an area of brownfield land, the site of a former waste tip.

The Nottingham Emmanuel School and The Becket School are two secondary schools located in Compton Acres, which both opened in 2008/2009.

The Nottingham Express Transit (tram system) runs along the disused railway line, and opened in 2015. Compton Acres has its own tram stop.

Compton Acres is itself a ward within the Rushcliffe Council area.

The area is a popular residential location for commuters into the centre of Nottingham, approximately three miles away on the north bank of the River Trent, although about 9% of workers are based at home in a growing segment of self-employed workers.

== History ==
Before construction of the estate, the area was mainly marshland punctuated with willow trees, many of which have been incorporated into the leafy feel of the area. In the estate there are open greens, parks and tree lined paths. A proportion of the estate to the east sits on a former waste tip. There are ponds scattered across the area where many families go to feed the ducks.

== Economy ==
Wattbike is near Ruddington Lane tram stop.

== Architecture and housing ==
=== Neighbouring Neighbourhoods ===
- Abbey Park
- Wilford
- Wilford Hill
- Silverdale
