= Nottinghamshire F.C. =

Association football club in England

- Full name: Nottinghamshire Football Club
- Founded: 1894
- Ground: Grassington Road
- Chairman: John Bentley
- Manager: Tom Groves
Home colours

Nottinghamshire Football Club is an amateur association football club from Nottingham, which had success at non-league level before the First World War.

== History ==
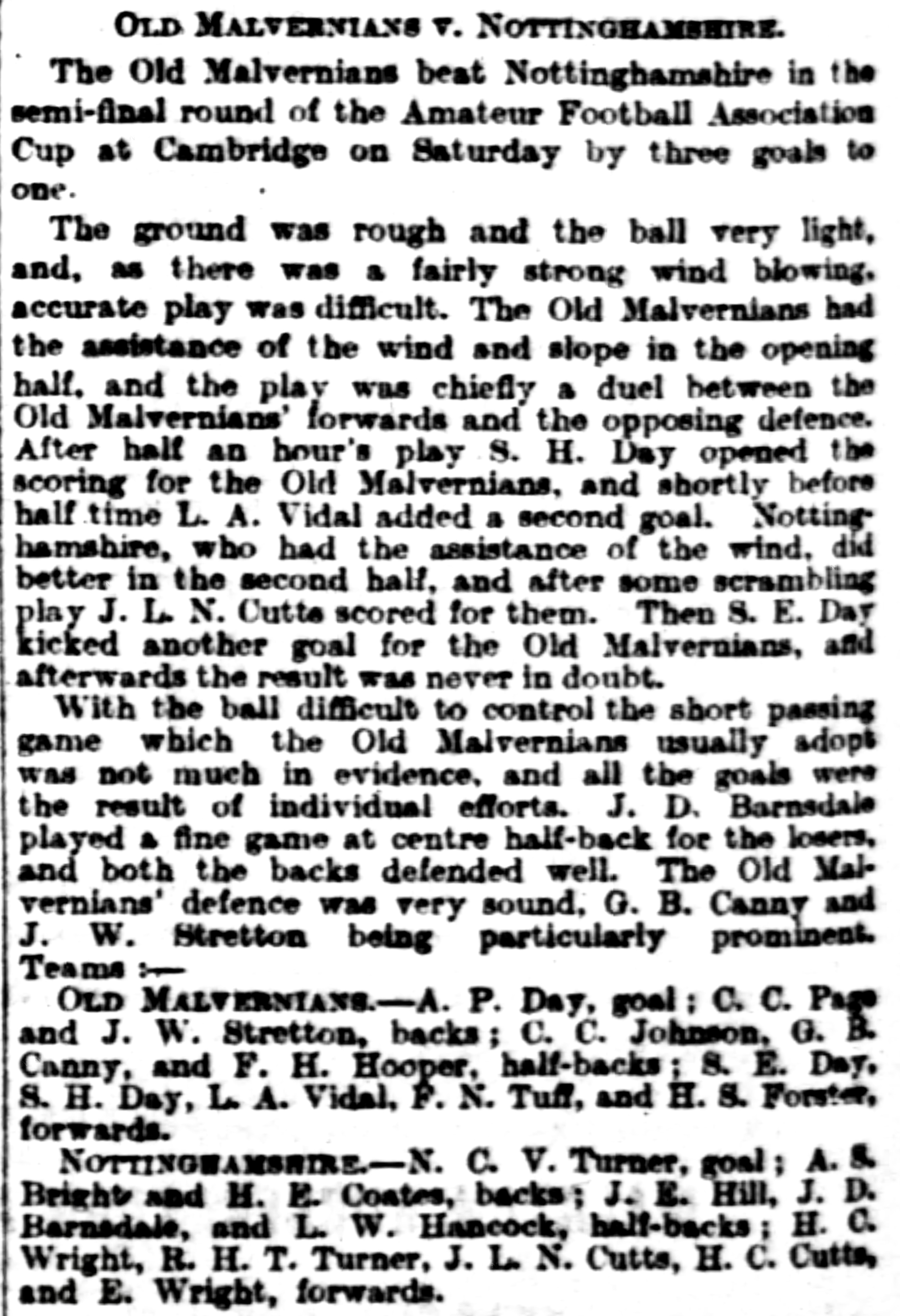
1909–10 AFA Senior Cup semi-final, Old Malvernians 3–1 Nottinghamshire, Times, 21 March 1910

The club was founded in 1894 by the Rev. Llewellyn Gwynne, who, at the time, preached at St Andrew's Church in Nottingham, under the name Notts Magdala; it started to enter the FA Amateur Cup in 1902, reaching the fourth and final qualifying round in 1904–05. The club grew to such a size in its first decade that its reserve XI split in 1904 to form a separate club, Magdala Amateurs F.C., and, to avoid confusion, in 1907 Notts Magdala changed its name to Nottinghamshire.

As with many amateur clubs of the era, Nottinghamshire was a popular guest on European tours, playing in the 1905 Coupe Van der Straeten Ponthoz in the Netherlands, and winning the Le Havre tournament in 1912 and 1914.

It achieved its greatest success on a senior level in 1906–07 by reaching the final of the Nottinghamshire Senior Cup, after beating the Notts County reserves in the semi-final. The club agreed to play the final against Nottingham Forest at the latter's City Ground, and was surprised to find that the hosts had fielded many first-team players to avoid a shock result. A further handicap was two players being unavailable as they were already booked for the Arthur Dunn Cup final, and, in the circumstanes, a 4–1 defeat was therefore no disgrace, midfielder L. W. Hancock notching the Magdala goal when three down.

The club was one of those which split from the Football Association in 1908 to form the Amateur Football Association and it reached the semi-final of the AFA Cup in 1909–10, losing 3–1 to Old Malvernians; the following season its run ended in ignominy, as only six players met up at Trent Bridge to travel to Leeds for the tie with Northern Amateurs, so decided to scratch - not knowing that two players were already in Leeds. After the war, it re-entered the FA Amateur Cup from 1920–21 to 1922–23, albeit without success.

It did have local success, with eleven titles in the Midland Amateur Alliance between 1908–09 and 1982–83, and ten MAA Cups from 1925–26 to 2003–04. It left the MAA for the Notts Alliance in 2003–04, and won the second division title in its first year; however the league then folded and the club did not initially join the replacement Nottinghamshire Senior League. It did join the competition in 2009, but was only saved from relegation from the second tier in 2013–14 by league reconstruction, and the 2015–16 season was its last in the competition, the club re-joining the Midland Amateur Alliance. However, other than as a veterans side, the club appears to have been inactive at first team level since 2023.

== Colours ==
The club's first colours were light and dark blue halves, later changed to chocolate and blue; on its move to Beeston, it adopted black jerseys and stockings, with scarlet trim on both. On its name change to Nottinghamshire, the club adopted green and white halves, with white knickers and green and white stockings; the schema has been the basis the club's colours since.

== Ground ==
The club's original ground was at the top end of Scout Lane. It soon moved to a ground at Beeston, and in 1904 it moved to the Notts Amateurs Cricket Club ground. After the Second World War, it was playing at Bunny Park in West Bridgford. The club's final ground was on Grassington Road. It occasionally held important matches at the Boots Athletic Ground at Lady Bay.

== Notable players ==
Walter Robins and A. C. J. German graduated from the side to Nottingham Forest.

John Mallard played for Nottinghamshire in the 1970's. He played a single game for the England Youth team at Anfield
