= Silverdale, Nottingham =

Area of Nottingham, England

Coordinates: 52.915°N 1.164°W

Silverdale
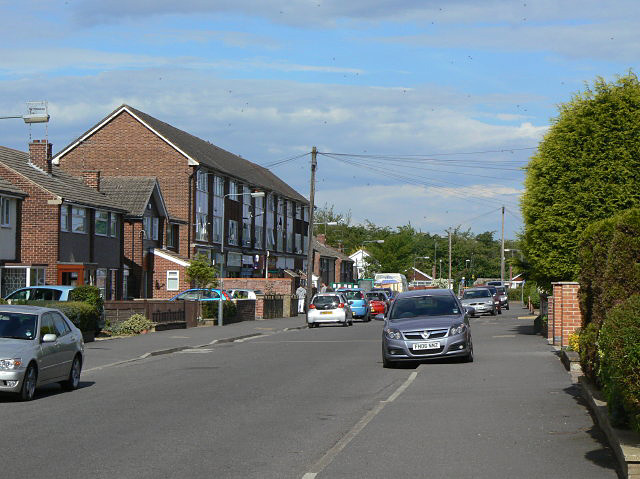
- Monksway, Silverdale in May 2009

- Location within Nottinghamshire
- OS grid reference: SK 56208 35648
- Unitary authority: Nottingham
- Ceremonial county: Nottinghamshire
- Region: East Midlands
- Country: England
- Sovereign state: United Kingdom
- Post town: NOTTINGHAM
- Postcode district: NG11
- Dialling code: 0115
- Police: Nottinghamshire
- Fire: Nottinghamshire
- Ambulance: East Midlands
- UK Parliament: Nottingham South

Silverdale Estate is a place in Nottingham, England.

== History ==
Constructed by George Wimpey in the late 1950s on land from the former Wilwell Farm. Bounded by the Clifton Estate, Fairham Brook, Compton Acres (formerly the Wilford Brick Works), Wilford and Ruddington Village.

The land was originally Wilwell Farm, part of the civil parish of South Wilford, part of the Parish of St Wilfrid's. George Wimpey initially wanted to continue the massive house building exercise it began in Clifton, but was required to wait until NCC agreed to its construction and ultimately granted permission to commence. Not initially known as 'Silverdale' it was the Ruddington Lane Estate until, in 1965, the Wimpy Estate and the local Community Association were renamed Silverdale owing to 'Silverdale Farm', another name for the part of Wilwell Farm.

Constructed as a private estate unlike Clifton to its east more than 450 brick dwellings were built over a three-year period. Built with only one access road, but several footpaths, it had no direct public transport service. Silverdale did not and still does not have its own schools, Government or otherwise.

Additionally, two streets, Fieldway and Barnfield were built in 1959/60, a continuation of Monksway / now Stanthorne Close, originally part of the estate. With the construction of the A52 Clifton Boulevard or "New Road" to locals. These two streets were separated from Monksway and joined by an underpass, which served Ruddington Lane (B680) and access to Bartons Buses. Originally double decker bus routes 14 and 56, but later the single deck coaches.

A similar underpass connecting Newholm Drive and Launceston Crescent through to Ruddington Lane and access to the then Corpus Christi RC School. The writer recalls many occasions, negotiating the Newholm underpass "over" the iron railings/spikes to play football on the Corpus Christi playing fields.

Constructed with its own Public House at the entrance to the estate on the corner of the A52 and A453. in 2010, the Clifton Bridge inn was according to the www.Pubs Galore.co.uk website closed. Known to locals as "The Ponderosa" referencing the US TV Series Bonanza. A small shopping precinct was constructed on Monksway at the same time as the housing. The original retailers being, hairdresser, chemist, dry cleaners, off licence, Forbuoys newsagents, butcher, Lipton grocers, hardware and Fruiterer. Over time these shops have changed business and some are now dwellings. 'Pets and Gardens' was a household supplies shop that also sold a fantastic selection of model cars. Mostly, Corgi and Matchbox. Mr and Mrs Stevenson ran the shop with the help of their two children, Paul and Elaine.

A community centre was constructed in the early 1970s from donations by the Silverdale residents in the form of "Buy a Brick" as well as the aid of the Department of Education and Science and a lease from Nottingham City Council running until 1998. Silverdale residents also conducted fundraising on Sundays over a period of approximately twelve months. A youth club was the initial idea and was well supplied with activities and supported by the local youth. Located on The Downs, near the footpath connecting Clifton to Silverdale and schools.

Silverdale did boast a football team, Silverdale United albeit short-lived, in the early 1970s. They were successful in England and Europe. Attending one competition in Winnipeg Canada. Playing its home games on the playing fields alongside Brookthrope Way and drawing its players from the estate and Clifton.

As Silverdale has no schools, young children were able to access several primary and comprehensive schools in Clifton, Corpus Christi RC School on nearby Ruddington Lane and other public schools in Nottingham.

The then Brooksby Primary Schools was accessed on foot along an unsealed 'track'. A Silverdale resident decided that the then rough 'track' connecting the primary School and more importantly to the Comprehensive schools in Clifton, should be sealed and lighting provided. After several months of letter writing the NCC agreed to seal and light the as then unnamed footpath.

Residents dubbed this 'The Black Path.' So named as the few lights seldom worked and the upper end of the path had on one side a small copse, which was also home to a Scout Group. The lack of natural light also played its part in the path's nickname. Starting at the small bridge near the Community Centre, along the Brook and turning right and continuing up towards Farnborough Spencer Academy and out on to Farnborough Road. The path is now known as "Silverdale Walk".

== Education around Silverdale ==
- Farnborough Spencer Academy
- Central College Nottingham

Children also access South Wilford CofE Primary School, also known as St Wilfrids, Wilford and several other senior public schools located in Nottingham CBD.

Fairham Comprehensive School for Boys was located nearby on Clifton Estate. A number of lads from Silverdale Estate attended Fairham Comp in the 60's and 70's.

== Fairham Brook ==
Fairham Brook from which the (now closed) Fairham Comprehensive School took its name, runs through the low lying flood plain between Clifton and Silverdale, to the River Trent.

On several occasions "The Brook" as it is known to locals flooded across large tracts of land. Housing in Silverdale or Clifton was not affected, as the land is higher. Several playing fields were flooded for approximately two weeks. With the construction of the former Brooksby Primary School, its course was diverted. The writer of this entry recalls two floods in the late 1960s and early 1970s. Causing much merriment as 'no school today' was the cry. The NCC Education Dept, funded a raised footpath from the school gate on the Clifton side of Fairham Brook to the higher ground close to the Brooksby Primary School buildings, so alleviating any lost academic activity for students.

The second flood occurred after the flood bank stabilisation project had been completed in the early 1970s. The floodbank, the writer recalls, was a success and the playing fields on the Silverdale Estate were under water for two weeks. The NCC playground, Silverdale Community Centre and access to both Brooksby, [Farnborough] and [Fairham] schools was unimpeded. The floodbank at several points on The Downs and Brookthrope Way did start to subside, though 'experts at the time' declared this to be 'quite normal'.

Large parts of Fairham Brook are now protected and form part of the Sites of Special Scientific Interest in the immediate area. It is open to the public, even though initially created as a nature reserve for students of Fairham College.

As far as wildlife goes it boosts a large number of fish including chub, perch, roach, gudgeon, brown trout, bleak and barbel. Kingfishers, otters, water rails, herons and a number of different birds have been sighted as well

== Silverdale today ==
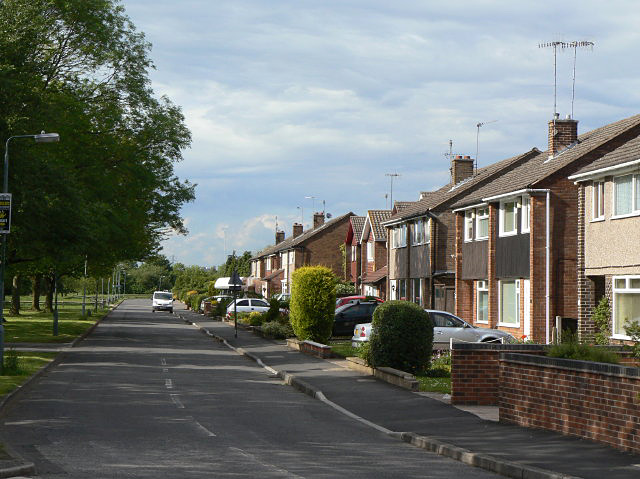
The Downs

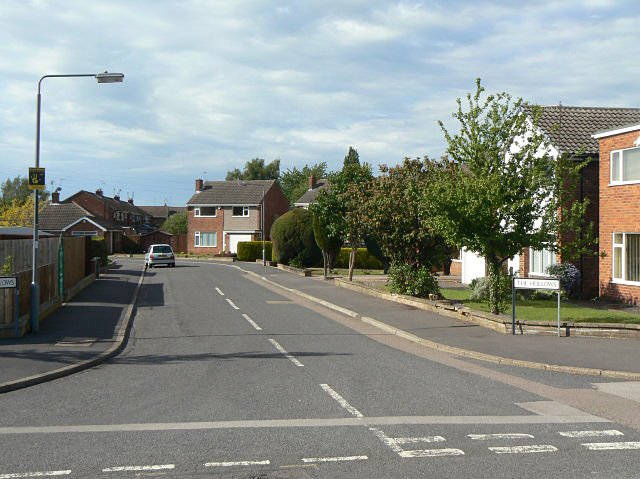
The Hollows

In April 2008 The NCC approved plans for the re-development of the former Brooksby Primary School site, as an Aged Care facility. Replacing a similar facility on Sturgeon Avenue "The Spinney" and to increase the numbers of beds for residents in the Silverdale and Wilford areas. (Source Nottingham Evening Post 29 May 2009)

As of 2021, the former Primary School site remains cleared but no plans for any buildings have come to fruition.

A long overdue bike track / walking track was built alongside The Brook in the late 1990s. From the small bridge, across The Brook that 'joined' Clifton with Silverdale. Along the south bank of The Brook, behind the Community Centre, with an 'intersection' directly opposite and up to Monksway. Continuing along the same bank again, alongside the playing fields and The Brook, finally meeting up with the road intersections of Clifton Lane and Westerfield Way.

The Silverdale Community Centre is widely used by local residents for various community and sporting activities. Families make use of its pre-school and child care programs.

== Bus service ==
The initial public transport to Silverdale did not enter the estate. Bartons Buses Trent Barton and the former Nottingham City Transport (NCT) provided existing services from Ruddington Lane and Clifton Boulevard.

- 55 - Clifton (Hartness Road) to Arnold | Nottingham City Transport

== Tram service ==
The Nottingham Express Transit (NET) Phoenix Park to Clifton South Line runs along, in part, the old GCR line and exit behind the Silverdale Estate, through farmland and exit on Farnborough Road, near Farnborough Spencer Academy. This line serves residents of Silverdale with the nearest stops on Ruddington Lane in Wilford and Southchurch Drive in Clifton. After severe delays during construction, the NET Phase 2 tramlines in Nottingham became operational in 2015.

== See also ==
- List of Sites of Special Scientific Interest in Nottinghamshire
- Wilford
- Compton Acres
- Clifton, Nottingham
- Great Central Railway
- Ruddington
