= Holme Pierrepont =

Hamlet and civil parish in Nottinghamshire, England

Coordinates: 52.946°N 1.066°W

- Hamlet and civil parish
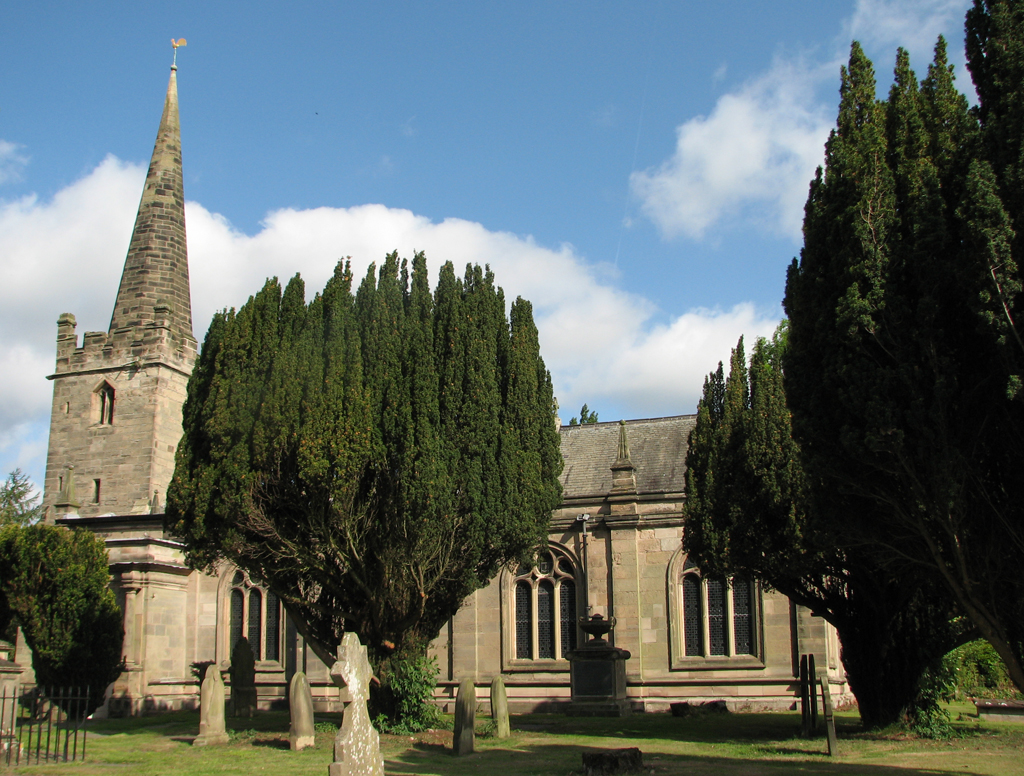
- St Edmund's Church, Holme Pierrepont

- Location within Nottinghamshire
- Interactive map of Holme Pierrepont
- Area: 2.67 sq mi (6.9 km^{2})
- Population: 568 (2021 Census)
  - Density: 213/sq mi (82/km^{2})
- OS grid reference: SK 62752 39178
  - London: 105 mi (169 km) SSE
- District: Rushcliffe
- Shire county: Nottinghamshire
- Region: East Midlands
- Country: England
- Sovereign state: United Kingdom
- Settlements: Holme Pierrepont; Adbolton; Bassingfield
- Post town: NOTTINGHAM
- Postcode district: NG12
- Dialling code: 0115
- Police: Nottinghamshire
- Fire: Nottinghamshire
- Ambulance: East Midlands
- UK Parliament: Rushcliffe
- Website: www.holmepierrepontandgamstonpc.org.uk

Holme Pierrepont is a hamlet and civil parish located 5 miles (8 km) south-east of the city of Nottingham in Nottinghamshire, England. It is in the Gamston ward of the Rushcliffe local authority in the East Midlands region. The population of the civil parish (which envelops Adbolton, Bassingfield and a fringe portion of Lady Bay) as at the 2011 census was 528, and this reported 568 residents at the 2021 census.

The word Holme comes from the Old English and Old Norse words for a small island or low-lying land by a river. Pierrepont is northern French for "Stone Bridge" and is the surname of an Anglo-Norman family that once held the manor. Henry Perpount, of Holme by Nottingham, appears as a defendant in a Common Pleas record of 1433.

== National Water Sports Centre ==
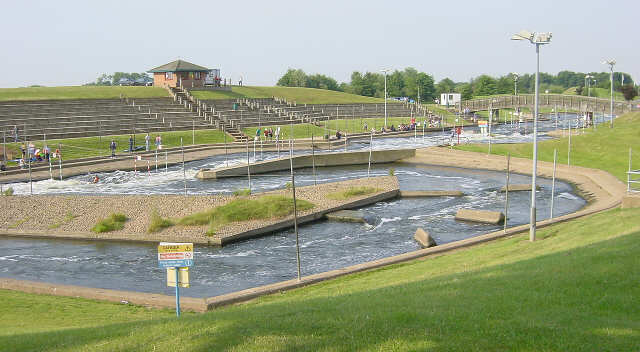

The National Water Sports Centre was purpose-built to facilitate the training of elite athletes and the holding of National and International competitions primarily in the disciplines of rowing and both white water and placid water kayaking/canoeing, although it is used to run many other activities. The Centre is set in 270 acres (1.1 km^{2}) of country park and boasts a 2000 m Regatta Lake, White Water Slalom Course and Water Skiing Lagoon.

The National Water Sports Centre is currently owned by Nottinghamshire County Council and leased to Sport England. As part of the re-profiling of National Centres, Sport England did not continue to fund the National Water Sports Centre after its management contract ended in 2009.

== Holme Pierrepont Hall ==
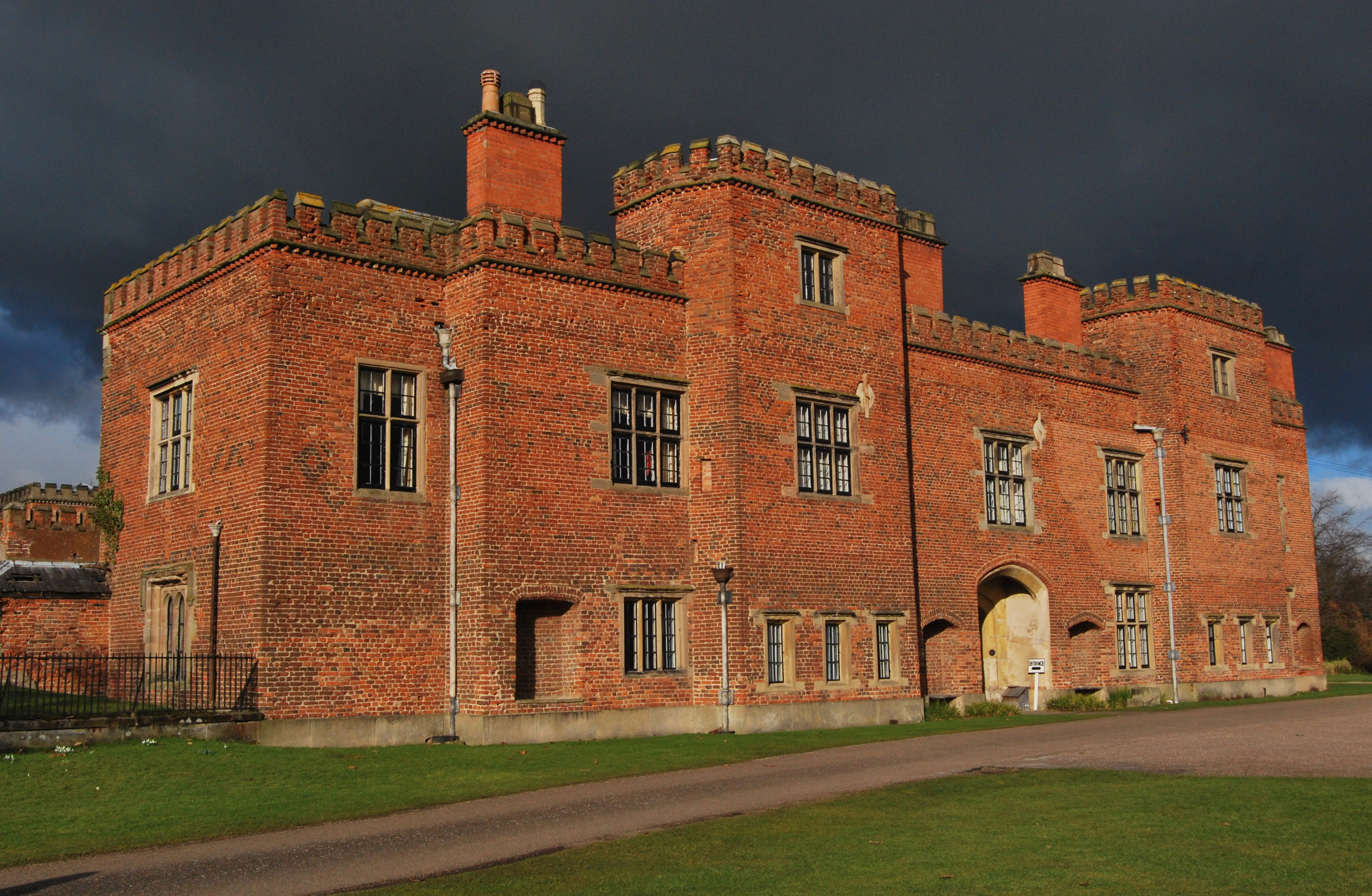
Holme Pierrepont Hall

Holme Pierrepont Hall is a Grade I listed medieval hall. The hall was built by Sir William Pierrepont around 1500, and inhabited by subsequent generations of the Pierrepont family.

== History ==
There is evidence that Holme Pierrepont was settled by farming communities at least as long ago as the Neolithic era. Archaeological remains from the Bronze Age, Iron Age and Roman period have been found in the parish.

The main historic features of Holme Pierrepont are the Church of St Edmund and Holme Pierrepont Hall.

- 1086 – the place comprised a mill, 80 acres (320,000 m^{2}) of meadow, and was worth £6
- 1257 – Sir Henry Pierrepont marries Annora de Manvers, heir to Holme, and the name Pierrepont becomes attached to the hamlet
- 1628 – Sir Robert Pierrepont created Earl of Kingston-upon-Hull by King Charles I
- 1715 – Evelyn Pierrepont created Duke of Kingston-upon-Hull by King George I
- 1940 – Holme Pierrepoint Estate broken up and sold
- 1960 – Proposed power station
- 1971 – Holme Pierrepont National Watersports Centre opens

=== Holme Pierrepoint power station ===
In 1960 the Central Electricity Generating Board put forward a proposal to build a 2,000 MW power station on a 525 acre (213 ha) site at Holme Pierrepoint. The site was convenient for coal supplies delivered by rail; for the availability of cooling water from the Trent; and could be conveniently linked to the nearby national grid. Most conspicuous on the site were two chimneys 600 ft (183 m) high and 8 cooling towers each 375 feet (114 m) high. The site was large enough for a second 2,000 MW station, making potentially a total of 4 chimneys and 16 cooling towers. A Public Inquiry was held over 14 days in 1960. The Inquiry inspector rejected the proposal on the basis of being in conflict with proposed green belt; depressing property values; adding to traffic congestion; and preventing access to sand and gravel deposits. The Minister of Power, Richard Wood, announced he would reject the proposal.

== Geography ==
Nearby places include:

- Bassingfield
- Gamston
- Adbolton
- Radcliffe on Trent
- West Bridgford
- Colwick
- Nottingham

== Bus service ==
Holme Pierrepont has only one bus service which terminates at the Holme Pierrepont National Watersports Centre is run by Nottingham City Transport.

Bus services in Holme Pierrepont, Nottinghamshire
Bus operator	Line	Destination(s)
Nottingham City Transport	11C	Nottingham → Railway Station → Meadows → Trent Bridge → Lady Bay → Holme Pierrepont (Water Sports Centre)

== See also ==
- Listed buildings in Holme Pierrepont
