= Abbey Park =

Abbey Park may refer to:

- Abbey Park (Grimsby), England, a former football ground
- Abbey Park, Leicester, England, a public park
- Abbey Park, Nottinghamshire, England, a suburb
- Abbey Park High School, Oakville, Ontario, Canada
- Abbey Park, the home ground of Armagh Harps GFC in Armagh, County Armagh, Northern Ireland
- Abbey Park, Kilwinning, the home ground of Kilwinning Rangers F.C.

== See also ==
- Park Abbey
