= Bassingfield =

Hamlet in Nottinghamshire, England

Coordinates: 52.93002°N 1.08°W

- Location within Nottinghamshire
- OS grid reference: SK6237
- Civil parish: Holme Pierrepont
- District: Rushcliffe
- Shire county: Nottinghamshire
- Region: East Midlands
- Country: England
- Sovereign state: United Kingdom
- Post town: Nottingham
- Postcode district: NG12
- Police: Nottinghamshire
- Fire: Nottinghamshire
- Ambulance: East Midlands
- UK Parliament: Rushcliffe

Bassingfield is a hamlet in Nottinghamshire, England. It is located 3 miles (4.8 km) south east of Nottingham, close to the A52. It is in the civil parish of Holme Pierrepont. The Grantham Canal lies 200 yards (180 m) to the south.
