= Fairham Brook =

River in Leicestershire and Nottinghamshire, England

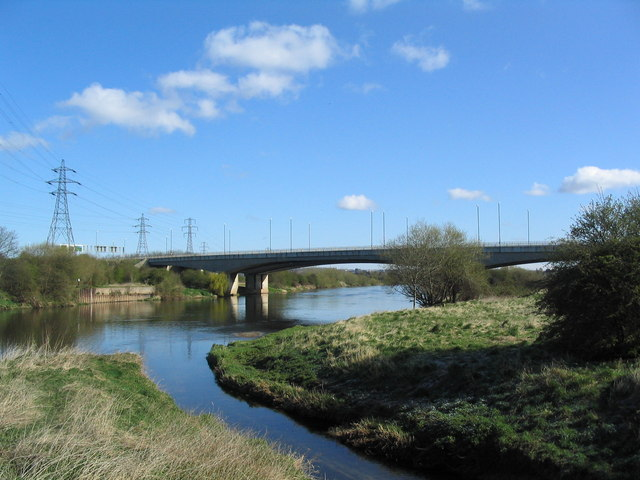
- Confluence of the Fairham Brook with the River Trent

Location
- Country: England
- Counties: Leicestershire, Nottinghamshire
- District: Rushcliffe
- Villages: Widmerpool, Bunny

Physical characteristics
- Source
  - location: Old Dalby, Leicestershire
- Mouth
  - location: Silverdale, Nottinghamshire
  - coordinates: 52.9238°N 1.1672°W
- Length: 26 km (16 mi)
- Basin size: 80 km^{2} (31 sq mi)

Basin features
- Tributaries
  - left: Gotham Brook, Nethergate Brook
- Progression : Fairham Brook—Trent—Humber

Fairham Brook is a 16-mile-long (26 km) tributary of the River Trent that flows through Leicestershire and Nottinghamshire in England.

== Course ==
The source of the brook is on the edge of the Nottinghamshire Wolds, near Old Dalby, Leicestershire. It initially flows in a northerly direction, and then turns west passing through the villages of Widmerpool, and Bunny. It crosses Bunny and Ruddington moor, and then flows north between Clifton and the village of Ruddington. The brook joins the River Trent near Silverdale, on the outskirts of Nottingham near Clifton Bridge.

== Catchment ==
The catchment has an area of 80 square kilometres (31 sq mi), which lies between that of the Polser brook and River Smite to the north, and that of the Kingston brook to the south. The brook has a number of tributaries, which are mostly unnamed, except for the stream that flows from Gotham, known as the Gotham brook, the stream that flows between Ruddington village and Mickleborough Hill which is known as Packman's Dike, and the Nethergate brook which drains the Clifton estate.

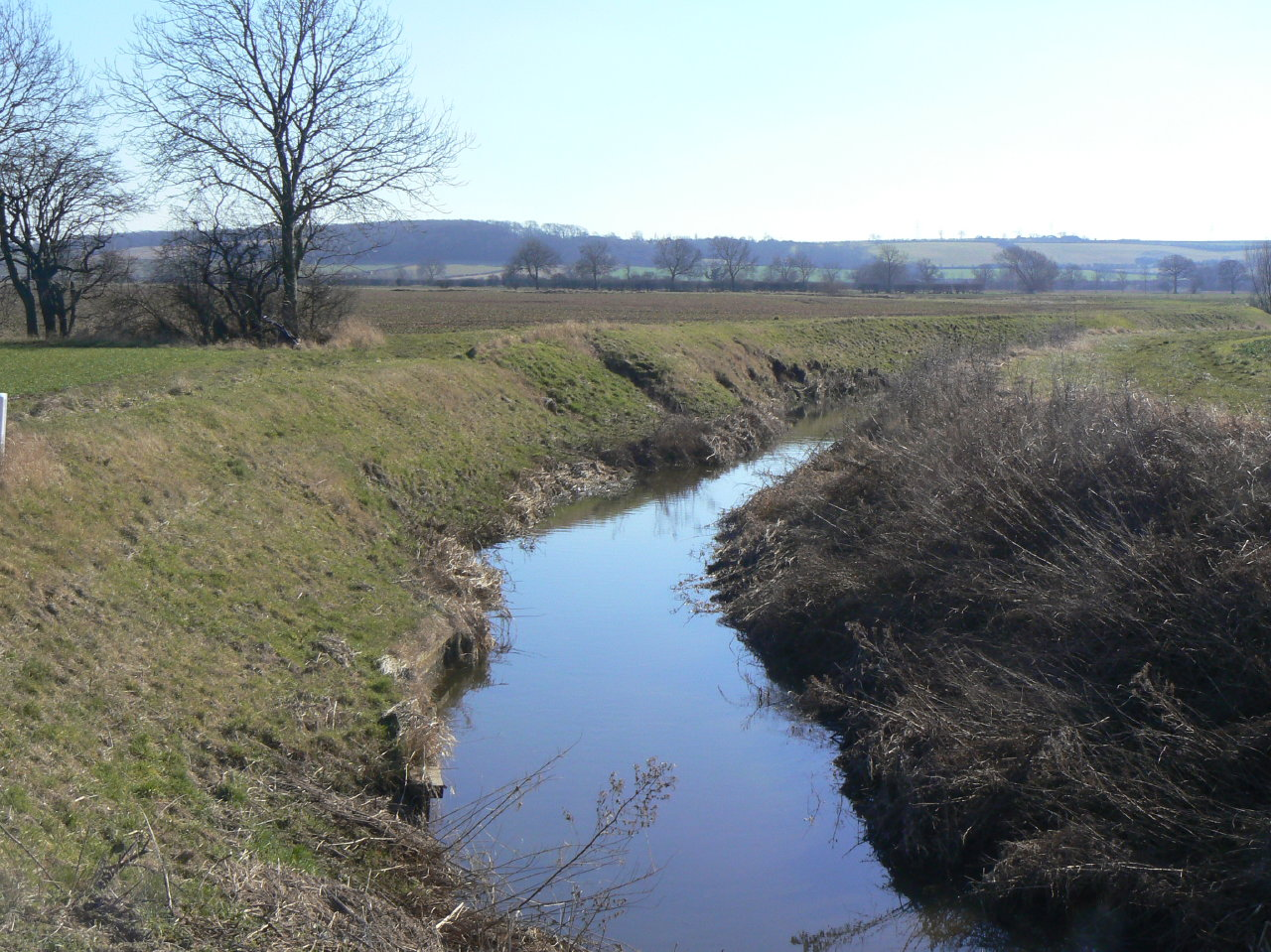
Fairham brook flowing through Bunny moor

In its middle reaches the brook drains an area known as "The Moors", a flat fenland landscape that includes Ruddington, Bunny, Bradmore and Gotham moors.

Agricultural drainage is important for these moors, with the smaller drains being maintained by the Trent Valley Internal Drainage Board. Fairham Brook acts as the arterial watercourse and has been designated as main river from Clifton to its confluence with the Trent.

== Wildlife and ecology ==
Alongside the brook near Clifton, is a local nature reserve, which consists of wetland and scrub, where kingfishers have been seen in the vicinity of the brook. There is another nature reserve beside the brook known as Keyworth Meadow, which supports a population of turtle doves.

In the 17th century, a bridge over the brook marked the start of Clifton Grove which was originally an avenue of elm trees that bordered the carriage route to Clifton Hall. Although the elm trees were lost to Dutch elm disease, the grove still exists, and contains other trees including oak, chestnut, and giant redwoods. It is now an important wildlife site and local nature reserve, that links other reserves alongside the River Trent, including Clifton wood and Holme Pit.

Fairham brook has been classed as having poor ecological quality under the Water Framework Directive. This is one of the lower bands in the five part framework scale, which ranges from high, good, and moderate, through to poor and finally bad.

== See also ==
- List of rivers of England
