= Gamston, Rushcliffe =

Village and civil parish in Nottinghamshire, England

Coordinates: 52.928°N 1.105°W

Gamston
- Village and civil parish
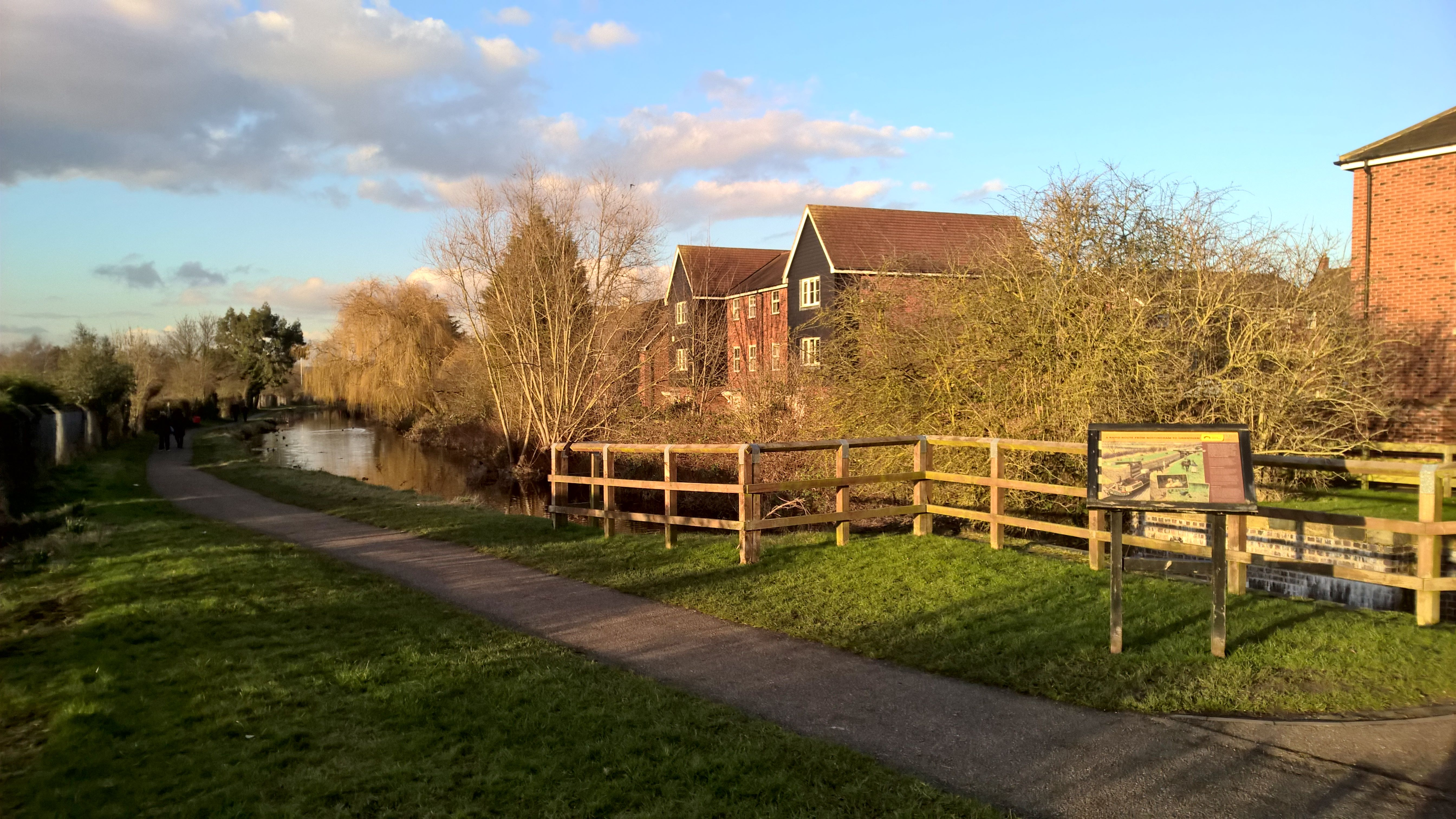
- Grantham Canal at Gamston

- Location within Nottinghamshire
- Interactive map of Gamston
- Area: 0.55 sq mi (1.4 km^{2})
- Population: 2,173 (2021)
  - Density: 3,951/sq mi (1,525/km^{2})
- OS grid reference: SK 60500 36590
  - London: 105 mi (169 km) SSE
- District: Rushcliffe
- Shire county: Nottinghamshire
- Region: East Midlands
- Country: England
- Sovereign state: United Kingdom
- Post town: NOTTINGHAM
- Postcode district: NG2
- Dialling code: 0115
- Police: Nottinghamshire
- Fire: Nottinghamshire
- Ambulance: East Midlands
- UK Parliament: Rushcliffe
- Website: www.holmepierrepontandgamstonpc.org.uk

Gamston is a village and civil parish in the Rushcliffe district of Nottinghamshire, England. It is situated approximately 3 miles (5 km) south-east of Nottingham, and the same distance east of West Bridgford. The population as of the 2021 census was 2,173.

== Administration ==
The parish of Gamston comes under Holme Pierrepont and Gamston Parish Council. Gamston is split into Gamston North and Gamston South wards of Rushcliffe Borough Council; Gamston North includes Holme Pierrepont And Gamston Parish Council. The parish contains the villages of Holme Pierrepont and Edwalton. The population of this ward also taken at the 2011 Census was 5,337. It is one of the nine wards in West Bridgford.

The border between Gamston and Edwalton exists at the junction of Beckside, Melton Gardens and Alford Road. The West Bridgford border however is somewhat harder to ascertain, although the Grantham Canal provides a partial boundary to the north-west of the village.

== Population ==
- 1801 – 97
- 1851 – 124
- 1901 – 96

The population of the civil parish at the 2011 census was 2,164, increasing marginally to 2,173 residents at the 2021 census.

Most of the homes in Gamston were built since the 1980s as part of the expansion of West Bridgford. The homes range from 2 bed bungalows and one bed terraces to 5 bedroomed family homes.

== Education ==
Local secondary schools and colleges include Rushcliffe School, West Bridgford Comprehensive and Central College Nottingham, although none of these are located in Gamston. Local primary schools include Pierrepont Gamston School, Edwalton Primary School in Edwalton and Abbey Road Primary School in West Bridgford.

== Facilities ==
In 2009, Gamston was proposed as the site for a 45,000 seat football stadium, to host games in the 2018 World Cup and Nottingham Forest football club, who have played at the City Ground in West Bridgford since 1898. Previously suggested sites included nearby Holme Pierrepont.

Lings Bar Hospital, in Gamston, offers mental health, memory, and rehabilitation services.

Gamston Community Hall is a two-court badminton hall measuring 16m × 16m, with an additional small hall. It has a capacity for 150 people or 120 people seated and is used for indoor sports and community events. It was used as a vaccination centre during the COVID-19 pandemic and was renovated in 2022.

== Notable residents ==
- Norwegian footballer Alf-Inge Haaland in 1996
