= West Bridgford =

Town in Nottinghamshire, England

Coordinates: 52.932°N 1.127°W

- Town
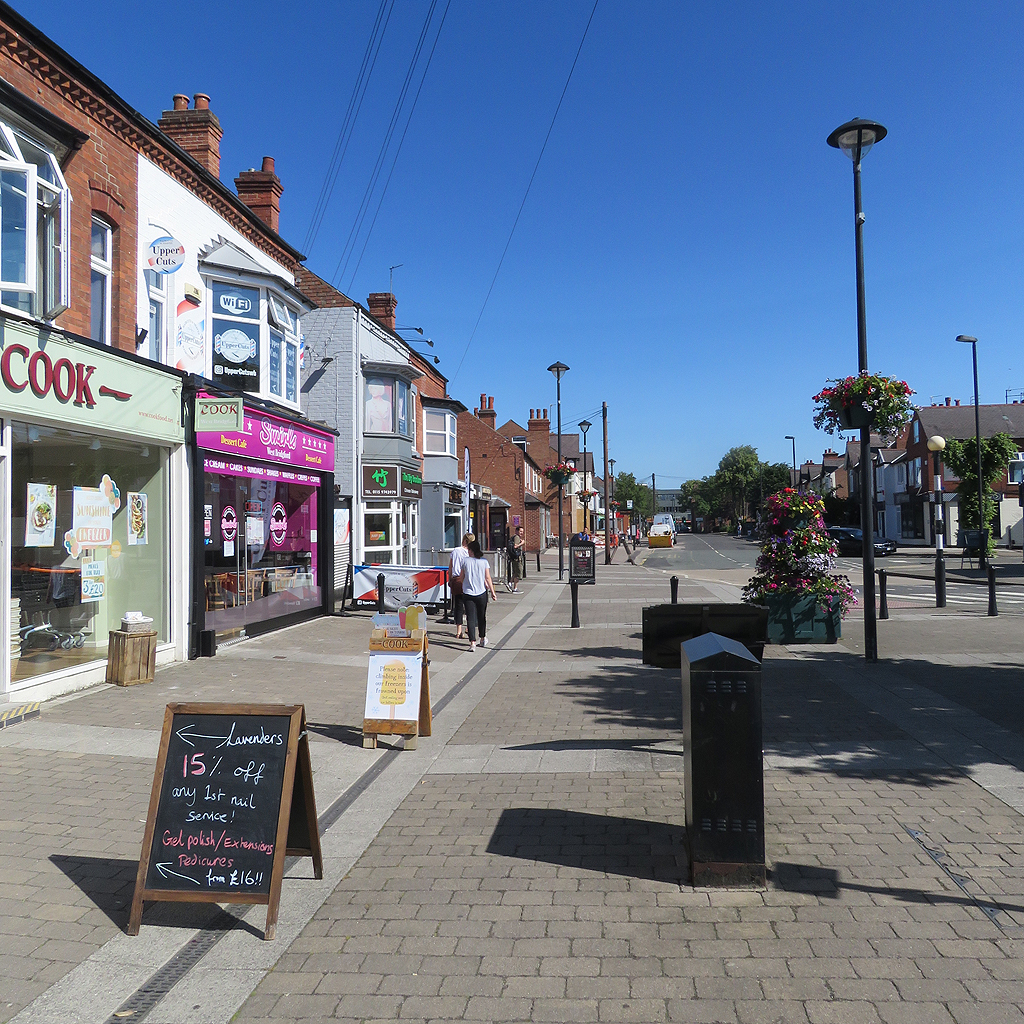
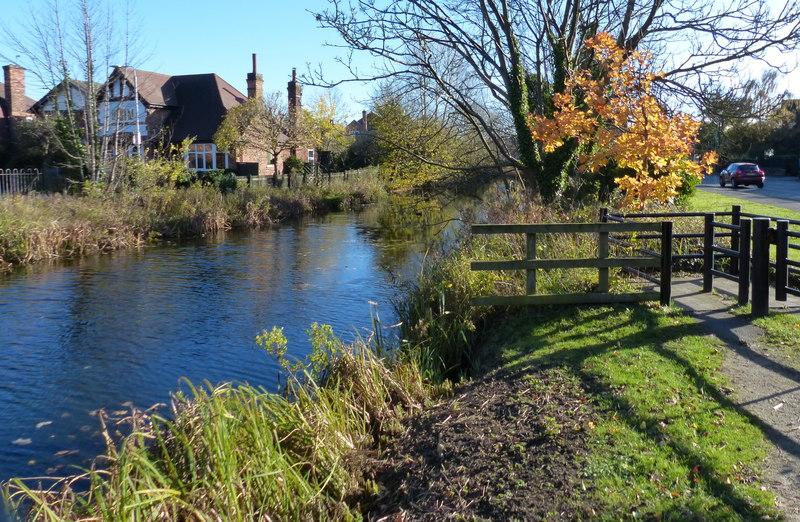
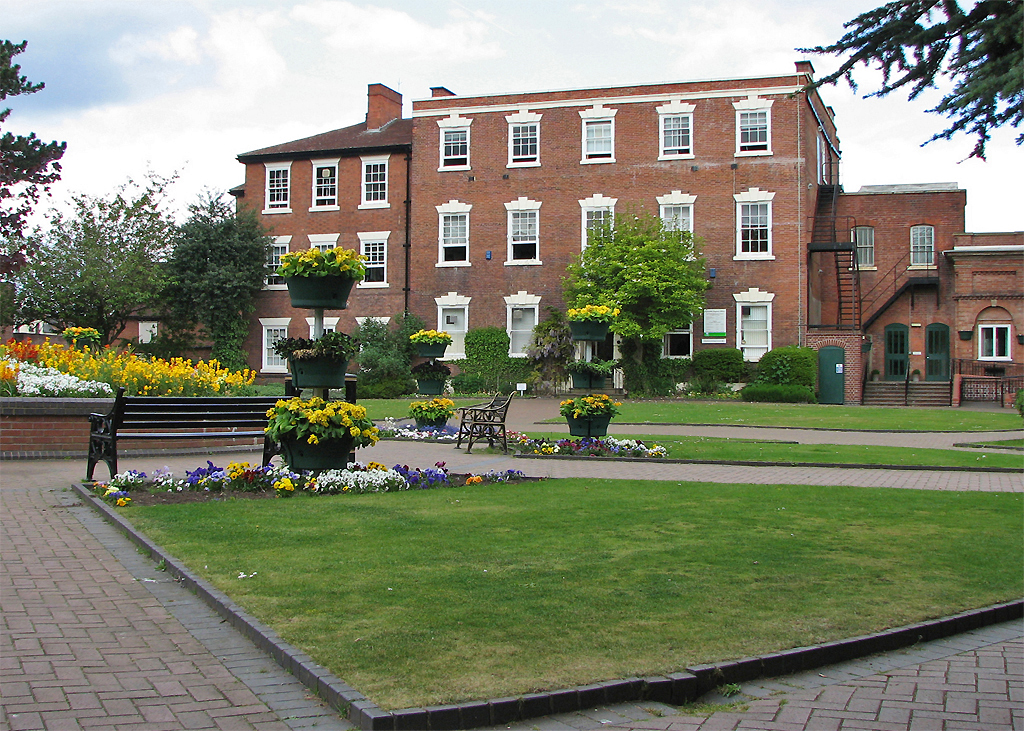
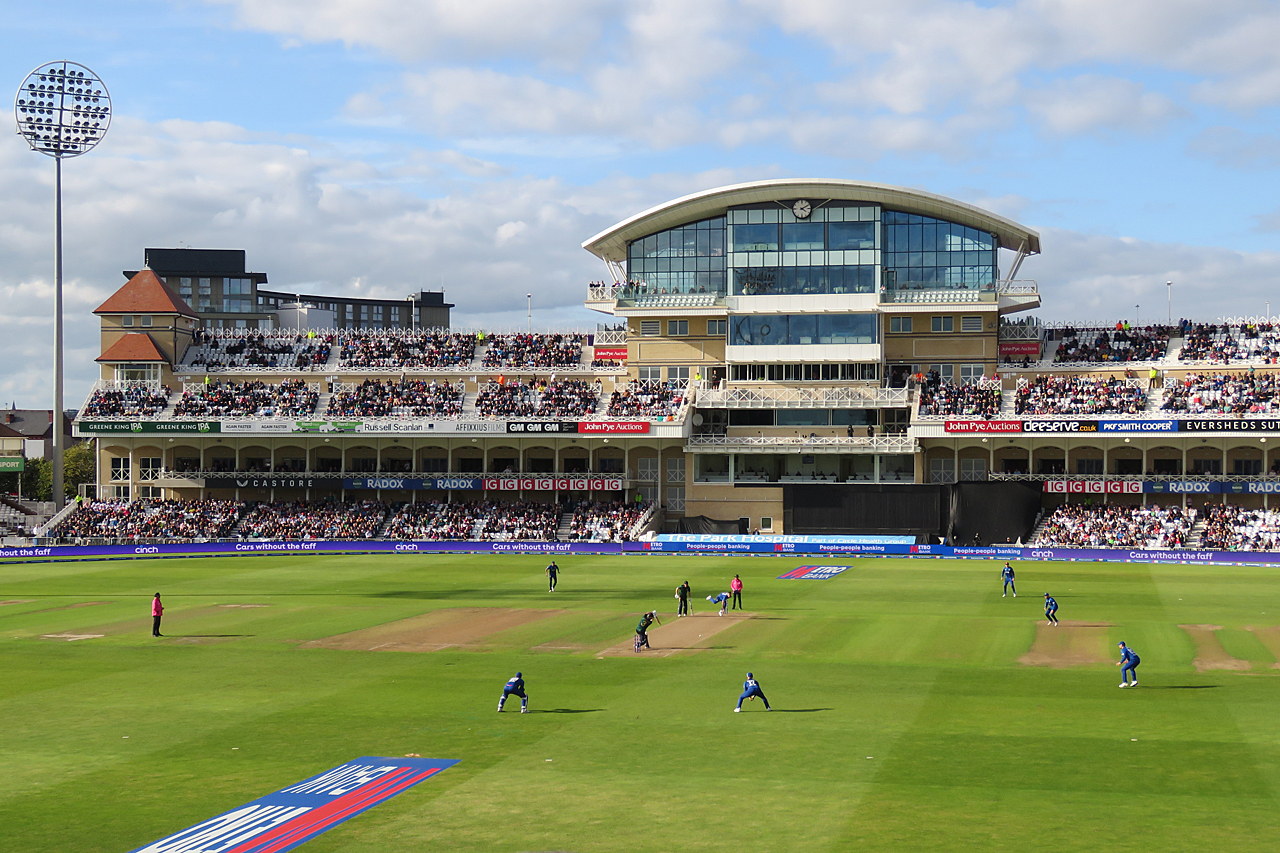
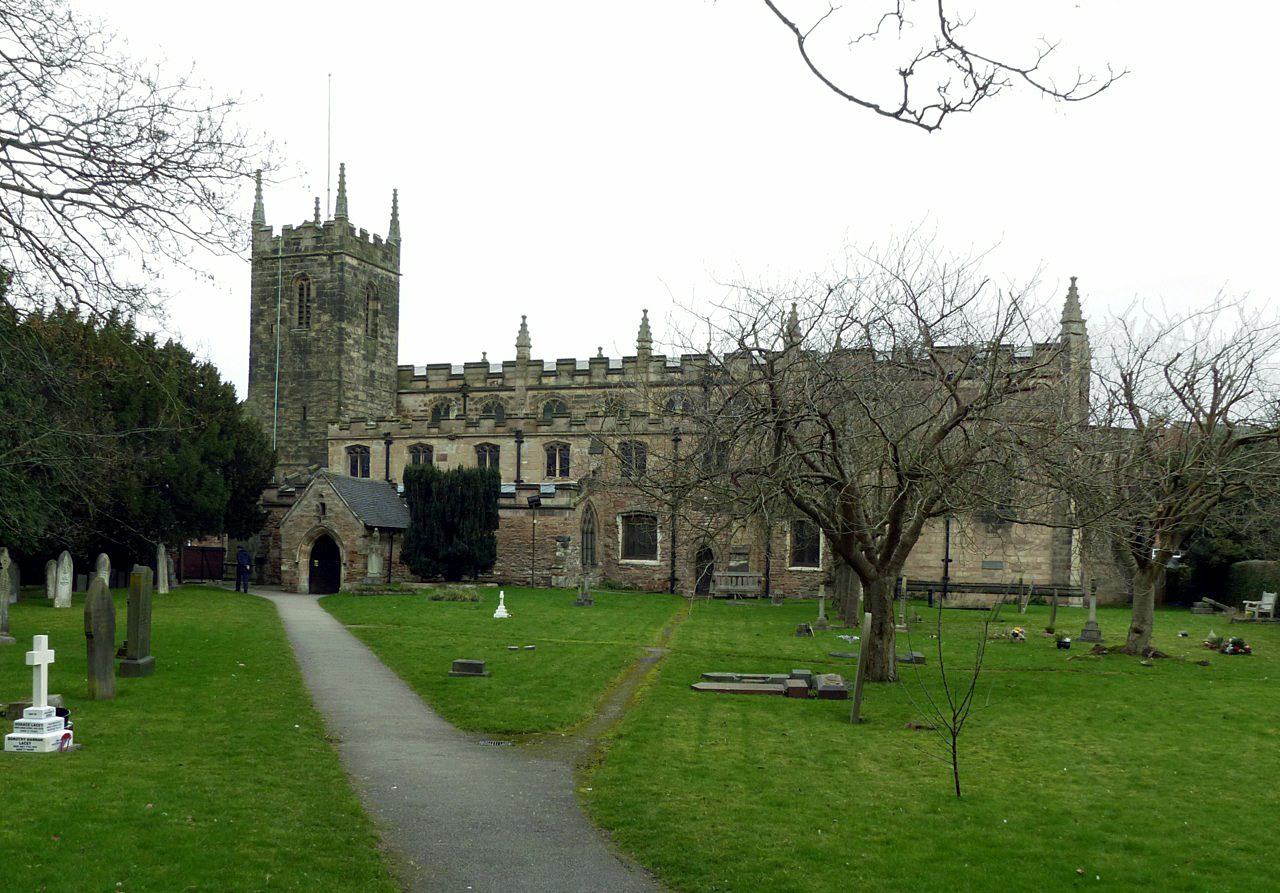
- Town centre Grantham Canal Bridgford Park Trent Bridge St Giles Church

- Location within Nottinghamshire
- Population: 36,487 (2021 Census)
- OS grid reference: SK 58673 37569
- District: Borough of Rushcliffe
- Shire county: Nottinghamshire
- Region: East Midlands
- Country: England
- Sovereign state: United Kingdom
- Areas of the town: List: Adbolton; Edwalton; Gamston; Tollerton; Town centre; Wilford
- Post town: NOTTINGHAM
- Postcode district: NG2
- Dialling code: 0115
- Police: Nottinghamshire
- Fire: Nottinghamshire
- Ambulance: East Midlands
- UK Parliament: Rushcliffe
- Website: https://www.rushcliffe.gov.uk/

West Bridgford (/ˈbrɪdʒfərd/) is a town and the administrative centre of the borough of Rushcliffe, in the county of Nottinghamshire, England. It lies south of Nottingham city centre, east of Wilford, north of Ruddington and west of Radcliffe-on-Trent; it is also south-west of Colwick and south-east of Beeston, which are on the opposite bank of the River Trent. The town is part of the Nottingham Urban Area and has an estimated population of 37,181 as of 2024.

== History ==
West Bridgford was founded between 919 and 924, when defences and houses were built at the south end of Trent Bridge. It was established by Edward the Elder to protect Nottingham and the surrounding area against incursions from Danes in the North of England. A survey during Edward's reign indicates that the population at this time was 192 people, 19 of whom were farmers. In 1086, the Domesday survey recorded the village of Brigeforde as part of the Manor of Clifton. In 1523, the Musters family won the West Bridgford estate after winning in a game of cards.

Some main roads in central West Bridgford are named after wealthy families that dominated its early history, such as Musters Road.

At the end of the First World War, the Musters family sold the Trent Bridge Inn and Trent Bridge cricket ground to the county cricket club. The club owned the inn briefly, then sold it at a profit to a brewery. After pressure, the Musters sold land for building, but strict planning regulations were stipulated for the West Bridgford Estate. This was planned over a grid of tree-lined roads. The main roads, such as Musters Road, had restrictions on housing density and size. All houses had to contain a specified number of bedrooms. Smaller houses were permitted on side roads and terraces were erected on roads such as Exchange Road for the servants of wealthy Nottingham merchants who had bought West Bridgford property.

=== Second World War ===
40 people were killed by bombs, ten men, 25 women, and 5 children. There were 63 high explosive bombs, with 62 of those during the Nottingham Blitz.

=== Recent ===
Though some services like business waste and cycling park provisions are carried out or provided by Nottingham City Council.

In Nottingham, West Bridgford was sometimes negatively dubbed "Bread and Lard Island", suggesting that its residents had spent so much on big houses and fur coats that they could only afford to eat bread and lard. It grew from a small village in the mid-19th century into a town of over 36,000 inhabitants by 2021.

== Geography ==
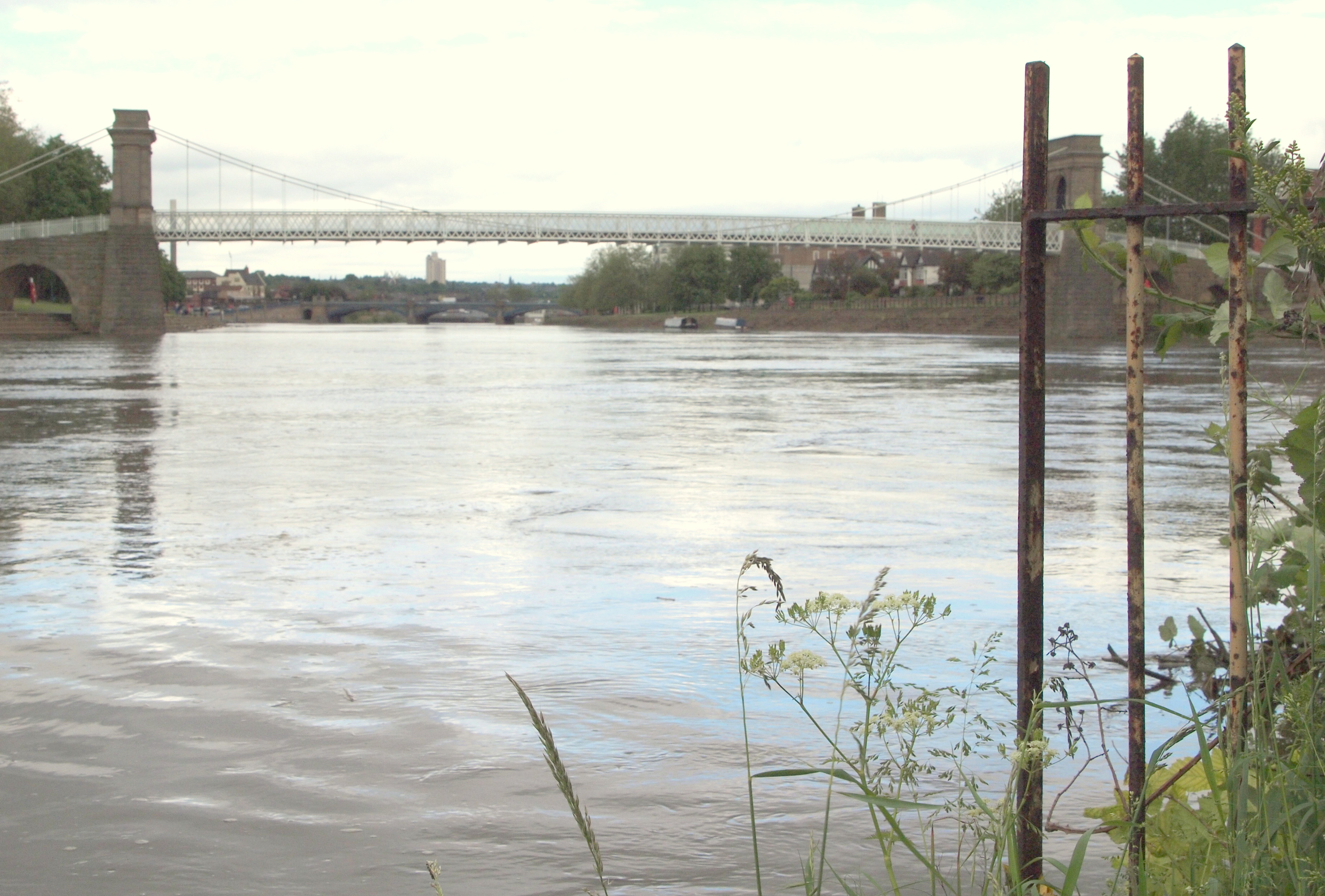
The River Trent separates West Bridgford from Nottingham

The northern boundary of West Bridgford is the River Trent. The river is spanned by two road bridges and a pedestrianised bridge allowing access from the town to the city of Nottingham. The bridges link to cycling routes in the city centre, railway station and the university areas.

== Bridges ==
- Trent Bridge has three traffic lanes in each direction. It is decorated on the sides with carvings visible from the river. In 2017, it was fitted with permanent steel safety barriers at pavement level to protect pedestrians attending major sporting events. Two spans of the original medieval bridge remain, surrounded by a traffic island on the south side of the river, adjacent to Trent Bridge.
- Lady Bay Bridge has a single traffic lane in each direction. It was originally the rail crossing for the Midland Railway's Melton loop from London to Nottingham via Melton Mowbray, avoiding Leicester. Despite the line passing on an embankment through the centre of area, there was never a West Bridgford station; the nearest station was at Edwalton, which closed in July 1941, as did the line in May 1967. Much of the embankment has been removed and the route built over, but part has been converted into a public footpath. Some signs of railway sleepers and ballast can still be seen on the path.
- Wilford Suspension Bridge is a cycle and pedestrian bridge to the west of Trent Bridge, linking with The Meadows.
- Waterside Bridge under construction will give cycling and pedestrian access to Trent Basin and Colwick Country Park.

== Architecture ==
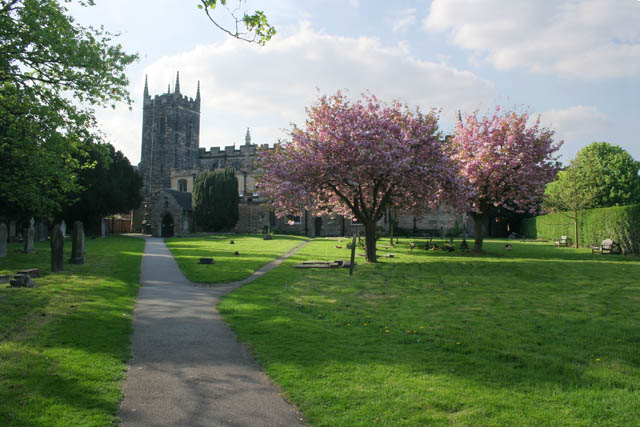
St Giles' Church, a grade-II listed building in the town and one of its oldest buildings

The central West Bridgford area has a diversity of buildings, mostly Victorian, although larger properties are being demolished for development, as no protection exists for the common housing stock.

St. Giles Church is medieval, but was heavily restored at the end of the 19th century.

=== Areas ===
- Abbey Park
- Compton Acres
- Edwalton
- Gamston
- Wilford Hill

=== Nearby places ===
- Nottingham to the north
- The Meadows to the north
- Holme Pierrepont to the north-east
- Tollerton to the south-east
- Ruddington to the south
- Clifton to the south-west
- Wilford to the north-west

== Local government ==
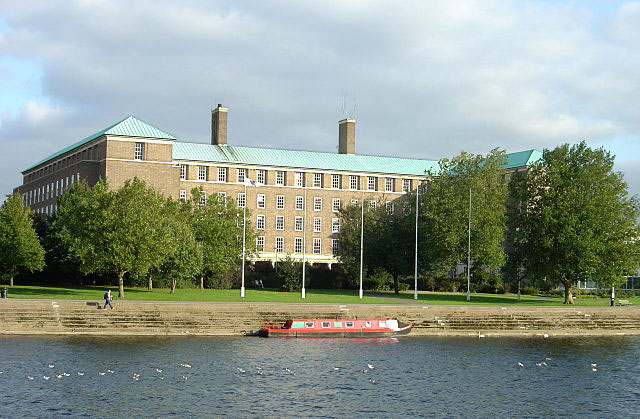
County Hall in West Bridgford

West Bridgford was created as an urban sanitary district in 1891 and became an urban district with an elected council under the Local Government Act 1894. In 1935, the parishes of Edwalton and South Wilford were added to the urban district. This then became part of the larger borough of Rushcliffe under the Local Government Act 1972.

The town is part of the constituency of Rushcliffe, which is held currently by James Naish of the Labour Party who was elected in the 2024 General Election.

Nottinghamshire County Council's headquarters are at County Hall, a municipal building on the south bank of the River Trent. Rushcliffe Borough Council's headquarters are at Rushcliffe Arena, a joint headquarters and leisure facility on Rugby Road.

== Sport ==
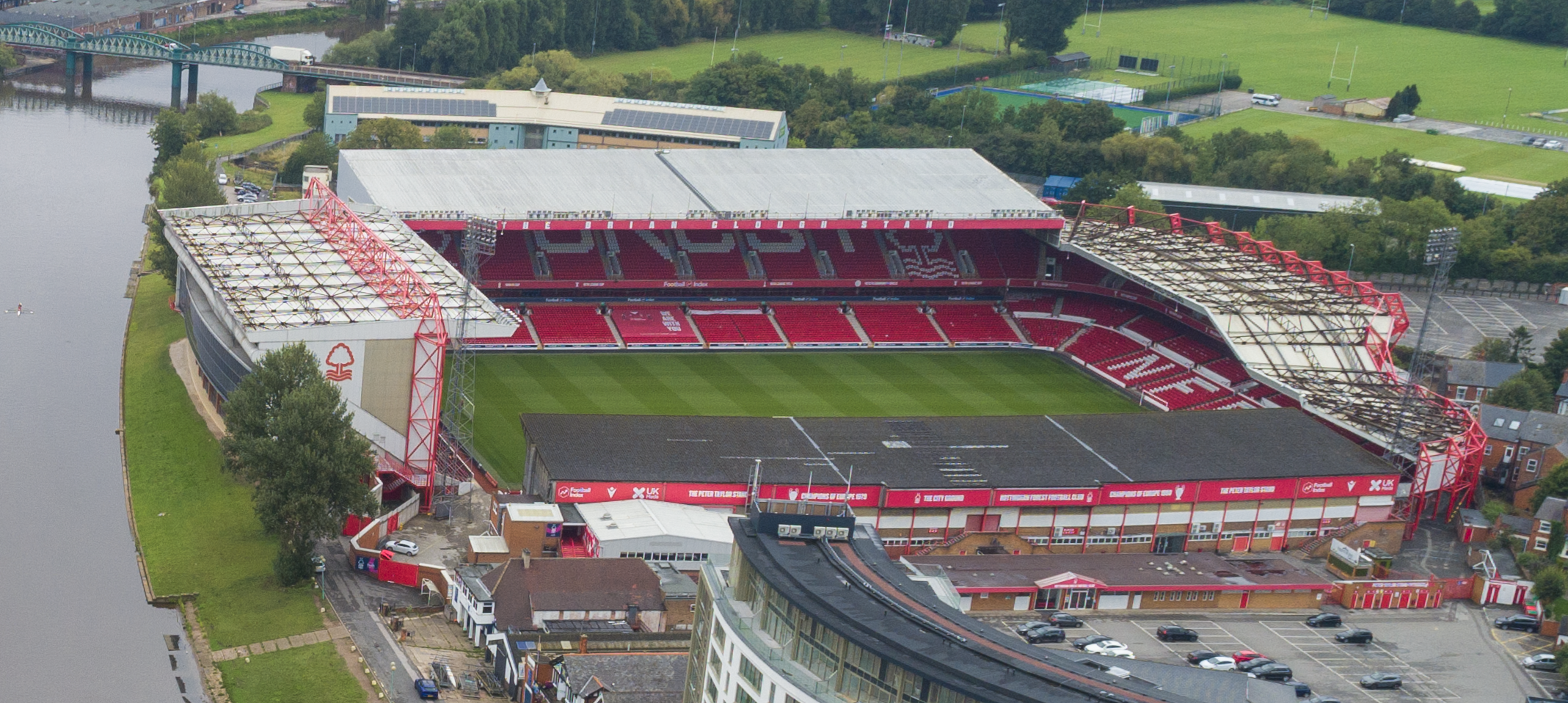
The City Ground, home to Premier League football club Nottingham Forest F.C.

Nottingham Forest Football Club play at the City Ground, beside the River Trent. The club was founded in 1865 and has played at the site since 1898. Between 1975 and 1993, Nottingham Forest was managed by Brian Clough and won a Football League title, two European Cups and four Football League Cups; it fielded players including Trevor Francis, Peter Shilton, John Robertson, Martin O'Neill, Stuart Pearce and Roy Keane.

At local level, West Bridgford has a number of football teams for all ages. West Bridgford Colts FC are thought to be the largest FA-approved football organisation in the country, running over 144 teams (checked Feb 2024) the club includes West Bridgford Football Club the Senior section for Colts, which started in 2011 on Saturday afternoons in the Nottinghamshire Senior League. They now play in the United Counties League Division One. Until the 2021–22 season Magdala Amateurs played in the Nottinghamshire Senior League played at the ROKO Ground.

Trent Bridge Cricket Ground was first used in 1838 and held its first test match in 1899, when England played against Australia. It is the third oldest ground used as a test cricket venue after Lord's in London and Eden Gardens in Calcutta, India. Trent Bridge is home to Nottinghamshire County Cricket Club, a first-class cricket club.

There are two rowing clubs in West Bridgford: Nottingham Rowing Club and Nottingham and Union Rowing Club, along with a rowing shell manufacturer, Raymond Sims Ltd. Several of the town's secondary schools feature rowing activities.

West Bridgford has two large Rugby Union clubs: Nottingham Moderns RFC in Wilford village and West Bridgford Rugby Club. Nottingham RFC moved its training base and reserve team ground from Ireland Road, Beeston, to Lady Bay after the 2005/2006 season. It plays first-team fixtures at Meadow Lane, just over Trent Bridge from West Bridgford.

There are two Karate clubs in West Bridgford: South Notts Shotokan Karate Club (SNSKC), a KUGB club, and West Bridgford Shotokan Karate Club (WBSKC), which is associated to the HDKI.

West Bridgford Hockey Club on Loughborough Road was the childhood hockey club of Olympic Gold medallist and former West Bridgford resident Helen Richardson-Walsh.

== Retail ==
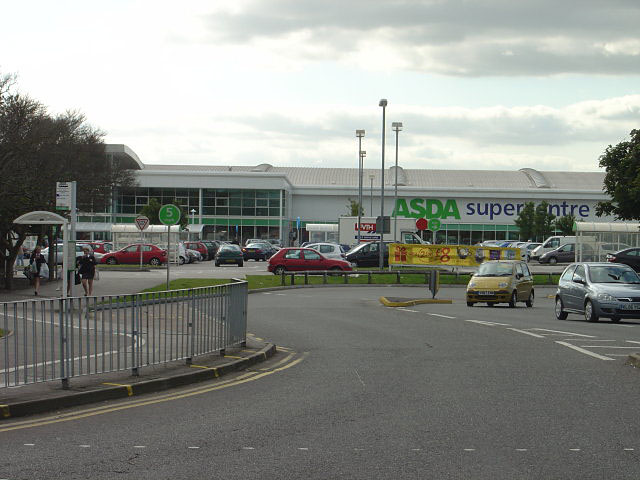
The Asda supermarket in West Bridgford

West Bridgford was the location of the UK's first major out-of-town superstore. In 1964, an American company, GEM, opened a store on Loughborough Road. Despite ambitions, GEM's British operations were not a success, with only two other such stores opening. National concessionaires withdrew, and in 1966 the fledgling Asda superstore chain, owned by a Leeds-based dairy farming conglomerate, Associated Dairies, acquired a controlling interest in the GEM operations. The Loughborough Road site has an Asda store, although it was replaced by a much larger one on land adjacent to the old site in 1999. The original building was demolished and replaced by a car park and petrol station area.

In 2018, Rushcliffe Borough Council appointed a team of retail consultants to recommend improvements and changes to the town's shopping areas and the wider public realm. These included better road design, with landscaping points to improve the movement of people from Gordon Road through to Central Avenue. Both roads have independent retailers and national chains. Other proposals included moving Bridgford Road car park underground and putting retail space at ground level. These proposals have largely been abandoned and, presently in 2024, have not been followed through.

== Education ==
The West Bridgford School and Rushcliffe School are secondary schools with academy status. The Becket School and The Nottingham Emmanuel School are Catholic and Church of England schools respectively, both in West Bridgford, but operated through Nottingham City Council. The Becket School is fed by primary schools around Nottingham, but by only one school in West Bridgford: St Edmund Campion Catholic Primary School. The other feeder schools are Blessed Robert, St Edmund Campion, Our Lady and St Edward's.

The West Bridgford School's feeder primary schools are West Bridgford Infant and Junior School, Jesse Gray Primary School, Heymann Primary School and Greythorn Primary School. Rushcliffe School's feeder primary schools are Abbey Road Primary School, Pierpont Gamston Primary School, Edwalton Primary School, Lady Bay Primary School and St Peter's School in Ruddington.

== Local facilities ==
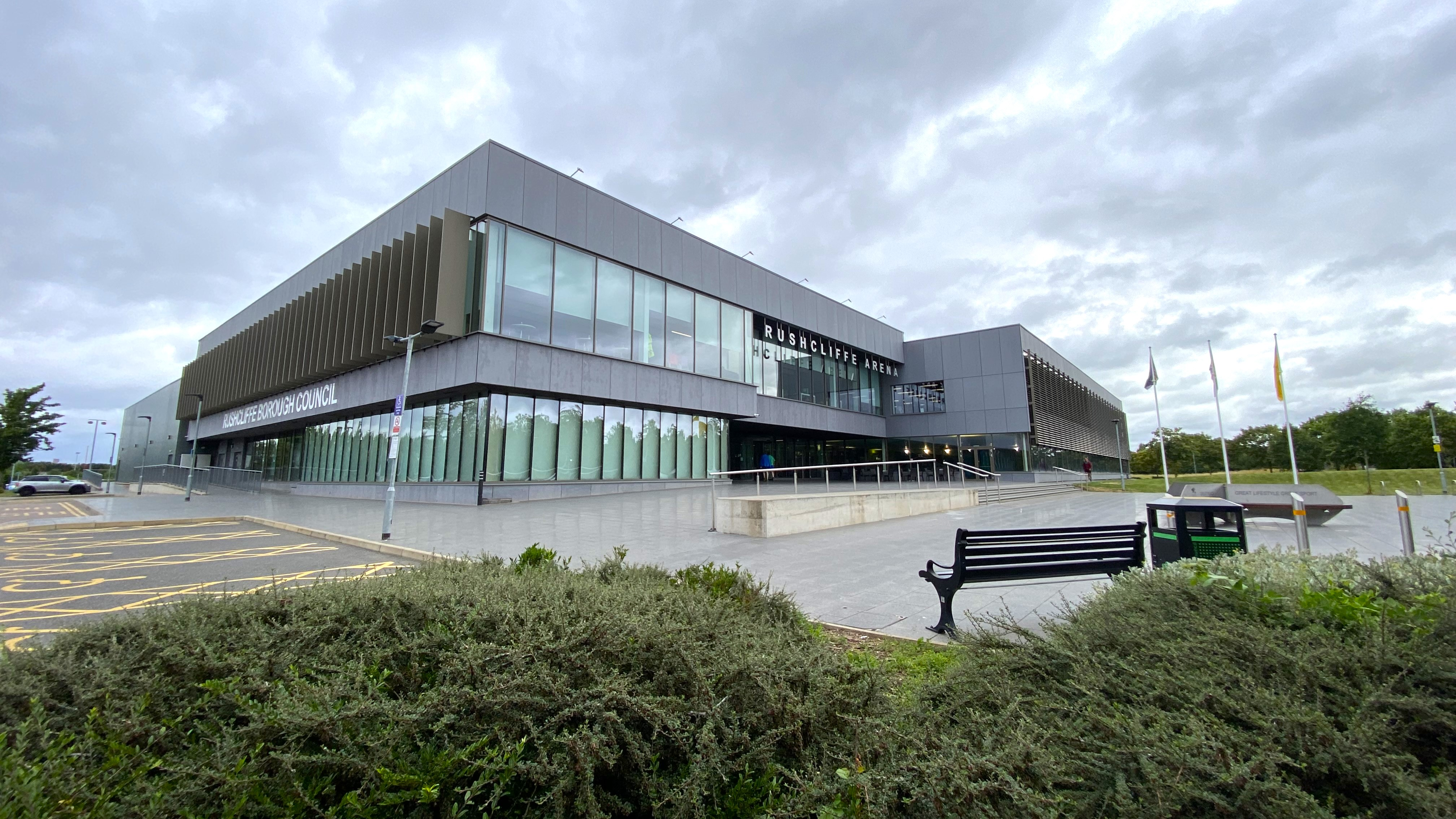
Rushcliffe Arena, opened 2017

- Rushcliffe Arena, extended in 2017 with a swimming pool, a gym and now the offices of Rushcliffe Borough Council
- West Bridgford Young People's Centre, adjacent to the library, with a music studio, dance studio and other facilities
- West Bridgford Library
- Bridgford Park
- The Studio Theatre, home of West Bridgford Dramatic Society, the only registered public theatre in Rushcliffe Borough
- Lutterell Hall, a managed community facility in the centre of West Bridgford. Owned by the borough council and managed by The Rock Church. Gifted to the people of West Bridgford by the adjacent church.
- Sir Julien Cahn Pavilion, a managed community facility on Loughborough Road, West Bridgford. Owned and managed by Rushcliffe Borough Council.

== Media ==
Local news and television programmes are BBC East Midlands and ITV Central. Television signals are received from the Waltham TV transmitter, and the Nottingham relay transmitter.

Local radio stations are BBC Radio Nottingham, Hits Radio East Midlands, Capital Midlands, Smooth East Midlands and Greatest Hits Radio Midlands.

The Nottingham & Long Eaton Topper newspaper was established in 1994.

== Transport ==
=== Railway ===
The nearest railway station is Nottingham, which lies approximately 1.5 miles north-west of the town in the city centre. It is a principal station on the Midland Main Line; East Midlands Railway operates regular inter-city services to Leicester and London St Pancras.

The former Manton Route from Nottingham to Melton Mowbray ran to the east of the town, although no station was ever built here. Instead, there was a station at Edwalton but it closed to passengers in 1944, with the through line to Nottingham not long after. Only a stub remains in use south of the old station site to Melton Mowbray as the Old Dalby Test Track. The site of Edwalton station has since been redeveloped for housing.

There was also a station in Ruddington on the Great Central Main Line between Loughborough Central and Nottingham Victoria; this closed in 1969 and since been left unused.

=== Buses ===
West Bridgford UDC's own fleet of buses, with a brown-and-yellow livery, merged with Nottingham City Transport in 1968.

Bus services in the area are operated by several companies:

==== Nottingham City Transport ====
- 1: Nottingham → Nottingham station → Trent Bridge → West Bridgford (Wilford Lane) → NTU Clifton Campus → Clifton → Gotham → East Leake → Loughborough
- 1A: Nottingham → Nottingham station → Trent Bridge → West Bridgford (Wilford Lane) → NTU Clifton Campus → Clifton
- 1B: Nottingham → Nottingham station → Trent Bridge → West Bridgford (Wilford Lane) → Wilford
- 4: NTU City Campus → Nottingham station → Trent Bridge → West Bridgford (Wilford Lane) → NTU Clifton Campus
- 5: Nottingham → Nottingham station → Trent Bridge → West Bridgford (Central Avenue) → Abbey Park→ Edwalton
- 5A: Nottingham → Nottingham station → Trent Bridge → West Bridgford (Central Avenue) → Abbey Park→ Edwalton
- 6: Nottingham → Nottingham station → Trent Bridge → West Bridgford (Central Avenue) → Gamston
- 7: Nottingham → Nottingham station → Trent Bridge → West Bridgford (Central Avenue) → Melton Road→ Edwalton Fields
- 8: Nottingham → Nottingham station → Trent Bridge → West Bridgford (Central Avenue) → Wilford Hill
- 9: Nottingham → Nottingham station → Trent Bridge → West Bridgford (Central Avenue) → Compton Acres → Ruddington → Clifton (Farnborough Road East, Southchurch Drive)
- 9B: Nottingham → Nottingham station → Trent Bridge → West Bridgford (Central Avenue) → Compton Acres
- 10: Nottingham → Nottingham station → Trent Bridge → West Bridgford (Loughborough Road) → Wilford Hill → Ruddington
- 10C: Nottingham → Nottingham station → Trent Bridge → West Bridgford (Loughborough Road) → Wilford Hill → Ruddington → Rushcliffe Country Park
- 10A: Nottingham → Nottingham station → Trent Bridge → West Bridgford (Loughborough Road) → Wilford Hill → Ruddington (Business Park)
- 11: Nottingham → Nottingham station → Meadows → Trent Bridge → West Bridgford (Radcliffe Road) → Lady Bay
- 11C: Nottingham → Nottingham station → The Meadows → Trent Bridge → West Bridgford (Radcliffe Road) → Lady Bay → Water Sports Centre
- 12: Nottingham → Nottingham station → Meadows → Trent Bridge → West Bridgford (Central Avenue) → Gamston → Tollerton → Cotgrave → Hollygate Park → Cropwell Bishop
- 12C: Nottingham → Nottingham station → Meadows → Trent Bridge → West Bridgford (Central Avenue) → Gamston → Tollerton → Cotgrave → Hollygate Park → Cropwell Bishop → Upper Saxondale
- 12E: Nottingham → Nottingham station → Meadows → Trent Bridge → West Bridgford (Central Avenue) → Gamston → Tollerton → Cotgrave → Hollygate Park → Cropwell Bishop → Bingham
- 90: Nottingham → Trent Bridge → West Bridgford (Radcliffe Road) → Radcliffe → Bingham → Farndon → Newark

==== Trentbarton ====
- The Cotgrave: Nottingham → West Bridgford → Cotgrave
- The Keyworth: Nottingham → West Bridgford (Melton Road) → Keyworth
- Mainline: Nottingham → West Bridgford → Radcliffe → Bingham
- Rushcliffe Villager: Nottingham → West Bridgford → Radcliffe → Shelford → Gunthorpe → East Bridgford → Newton → Bingham

==== Kinchbus ====
- 9: Nottingham → Trent Bridge → West Bridgford (Loughborough Road) → Ruddington → Bradmore → Bunny → Costock → Rempstone → Hoton → Cotes → Loughborough

==== Centrebus ====
- 19: Nottingham → West Bridgford (Melton Rd) → Tollerton → Normanton-on-the-Wolds → Stanton-on-the-Wolds → Hickling Pastures → Upper Broughton → Nether Broughton → Ab Kettleby → Melton Mowbray

== Notable residents ==
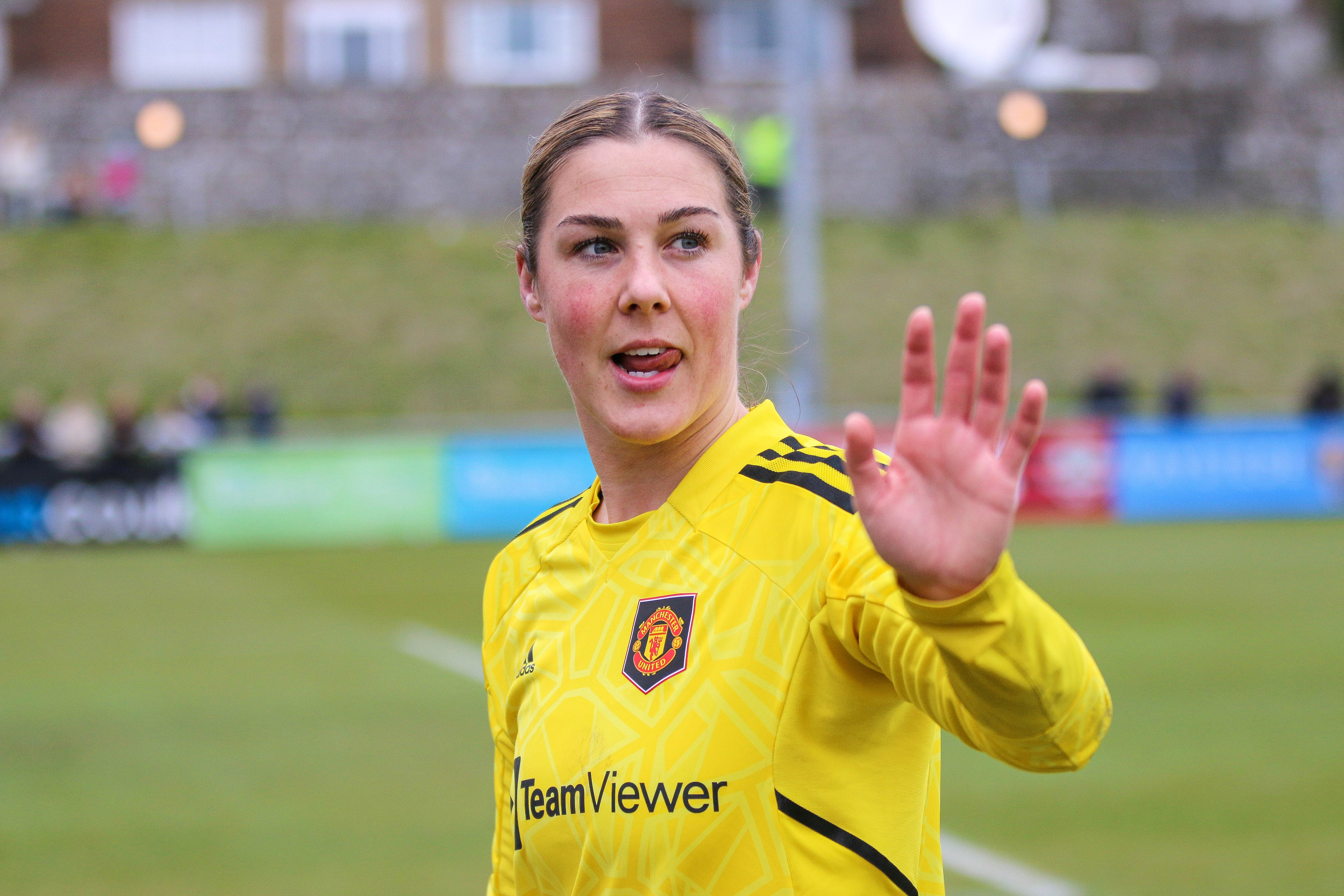
Mary Earps, former England women's national football team

- Mary Earps (born 1993), former England women's national football team Goalkeeper and winner of 2023 BBC Sports Personality of the Year Award. Earps played for West Bridgford Colts as a child in her early career and went to The Becket School in West Bridgford.
- Ellie Brazil (born 1999), England Women's under-23 and Tottenham Hotspur L.F.C. association footballer, was born in the town.
- Kenneth Clarke (born 1940), former member of parliament, was born in and lives in West Bridgford, represented the town as the Rushcliffe constituency MP from 1970 to 2019, and was Father of the House during his last two years in the Commons.
- John Crocker (born 1937), leading clarinet and saxophone player for the Chris Barber jazz band for just over 30 years, was born in West Bridgford.
- Leslie Crowther (1933–1996), comedian, actor and TV presenter, was born in West Bridgford.
- Helen Richardson-Walsh (born 1981), hockey Olympic Gold medallist, grew up in West Bridgford.
- Harry Wheatcroft (1898–1977), rose grower, lived in West Bridgford.
- The blogger and comedy musician LadBaby (real name Mark Hoyle, born 1987) grew up in West Bridgford.
- Rosie Bentham actor who plays Gabby Thomas in the ITV soap opera Emmerdale.

== See also ==
- Listed buildings in West Bridgford
