= Nottingham & Long Eaton Topper =

The Nottingham & Long Eaton Topper was a free newspaper located in West Bridgford, Nottingham.

It was Britain's largest circulating independent weekly newspaper with a distribution in excess of 211,000 copies a week (verified by the Audit Bureau of Circulation). Established by free newspaper pioneer Lionel Pickering in 1994, The Topper contained a wide variety of advertisements in addition to editorial items and had its own website, www.toppernewspapers.co.uk, which was believed to be the first newspaper website featuring a 'page flip' functionality enabling users to effectively flick through the paper online at the click of a mouse. The Topper was unique in that it thrived during a time of overall decline for the newspaper industry.

The Topper went to homes across the Greater Nottingham and Long Eaton areas and established itself as the region's main weekly newspaper.

On 19 August 2011 it was announced by the Trust managing the Topper's operation that it was in talks to sell the title, the only freesheet which remained in the area following the closure of the Recorder series, to rival Northcliffe.

A Northcliffe spokesman said at the time: "The Nottingham Post Media Group has entered into negotiations to acquire the Nottingham and Long Eaton Topper. There are a number of commercial and legal matters to be resolved which we are working through with the owners and the management of the Topper. Provided these can be agreed on, we would hope to close the deal later this year."

Group managing director Steve Auckland added: "We believe the Topper would make an excellent addition to the Nottingham Post business and provide an excellent portfolio with the Post for advertisers seeking to attract consumers in Nottingham."

Figures from the Audit Bureau of Circulation showed the Topper had a weekly circulation of 212,793 in April 2012.

The sale of the independent weekly to Northcliffe Media was finalised in June 2012, a month after being given the go-ahead by competition watchdogs.

Despite fears voiced by the National Union of Journalists, Northcliffe made clear it wanted to develop the free title and had “no plans” to close it.

Mr Auckland said at the time: “This is our first acquisition since I joined the company and demonstrates Northcliffe’s desire to grow its businesses. The Topper is a great free newspaper and we’re really pleased to have its team working with us.”

Topper managing director Alice Hall then added: “This is an exciting step for the Topper. As part of a larger group we will have more opportunities to serve the Nottingham business community and to operate as a modern media business.”

Mrs Hall soon departed, along with CEO Julie Davison, and staff were moved within months from the Topper's base at Maychalk House, West Bridgford, to the Post's site at City Gate, Nottingham.

In April 2014, executive Steve Allsopp left his role after 19 years at the title - and was not replaced.

Steve helped set up the Nottingham Topper in 1994 and went on to become general manager of the independent paper, by now owned by Local World.

His role was overseen by Post commercial director Helen Bowen-Green. Just Editor John Howorth, Deputy Editor Simon Holmes and Advertising Executive Dee Jeffers remained from the original Topper team. The editorial pair were made redundant in November 2014 and within weeks the publication had been renamed Post Lite. The Lite only lasted a few months, marking the end of an era in free newspapers started by Mr Pickering in the 1970s.

Mr Howorth later said: "It was sad to see us all uprooted from our offices in West Bridgford and the loss of our production hub in Derby but what we thought was the start of a move into the modern era ultimately led us all to the job centre.

"There are one or two bitter people out there who remember the good old days with Lionel and I cannot be responsible for their hatred towards the big machine which engulfed us but let me say we had one hell of a blast and some very, very happy times.

"We worked hard and competed with the big boys but we also had a fun time doing it. We had all sorts of weird and wonderful characters coming through our doors - some customers, some staff - but we always went home with a smile on our faces. I miss the old faces, banter, unlimited wind-ups, late nights on press day and, of course, the infamous open-to-all Monday night disco at "Toppers'. RIP Topper."

A consortium headed by B Squad Holdings and WU Dept revived the Topper online two years later, employing three of its former journalists, as well as renowned London-based photographer Robert Ball. Other contributors included ex-students of Holsam Training Agency, the publishing arm of the Topper established by Mr Howorth which operated out of the Musters Road HQ during the 'paper's heyday. Robert's sister Penny Ball, Antonia Pappa and Dan Rice were among those credited.

However, the 'curse of the Topper' as staff jokingly titled a series of unfortunate events spanning the newspaper's lifetime, struck again during the Covid pandemic when millions of back issues of the Topper were discovered in a secret basement at Eastcroft Incinerator. They had been destined for delivery by trusted distribution teams but seemingly never reached their target. Three men later convicted of various fraud offences were ordered to carry out 120 hours unpaid work, which included horticultural duties in the Memorial Park on Musters Road adjacent to their former place of work.
