= Wilford Hill =

Coordinates: 52.913°N 1.139°W

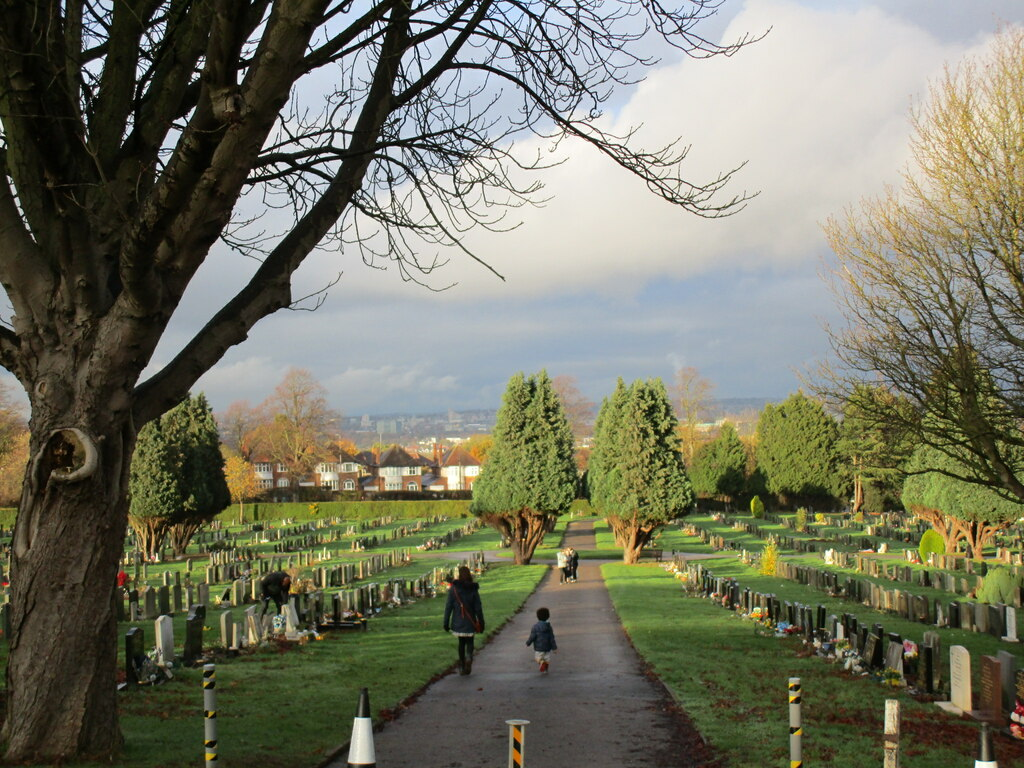
Southern Cemetery, Nottingham on Wilford Hill

Wilford Hill is the highest point in West Bridgford, giving views of the Trent Valley as far as Newark-on-Trent. It is listed as having an elevation of 87m and a prominence of 49m.

The area has historic significance due to its prominence and the presence of the Kings Road or old great road running cross its top, which was the main route from London and Leicester to the north of the country. By 1914 it was already thought to have been neglected for 150 years, so that "no cart could possibly cross it". The old road is known locally as "The Spinney".

Wilford Hill and Sharphill Wood were listed in 1066 as having belonged to Gytha, wife of Earl Ralph (Ralph the Timid), later transferred to the ownership of William Peverel a favourite knight of William the Conqueror, first sheriff of Nottingham, and lord of Nottingham Castle.

A community of mainly detached three and four-bedroom homes in West Bridgford arose. Constructed on "closes of land lying and being on the North West side of Loughborough Road in the Parish of Wilford in the County of Nottingham". It was mainly farmland until the early 1950s when local builders Frank Goulding Limited started building on the land. The first houses follow a similar pattern to those on Repton and Harrow Roads (if on a smaller scale), with 1930s styling and pyramidal roofs, later bungalows and houses with gable roofs followed. Voids were left during building that were later filled, resulting in a mixed style of properties and roof types.

Heymann Primary School was completed on Wilford Hill and opened in 1959. This now acts as a feeder school for West Bridgford School which lays just to the North of the housing on Wilford Hill.

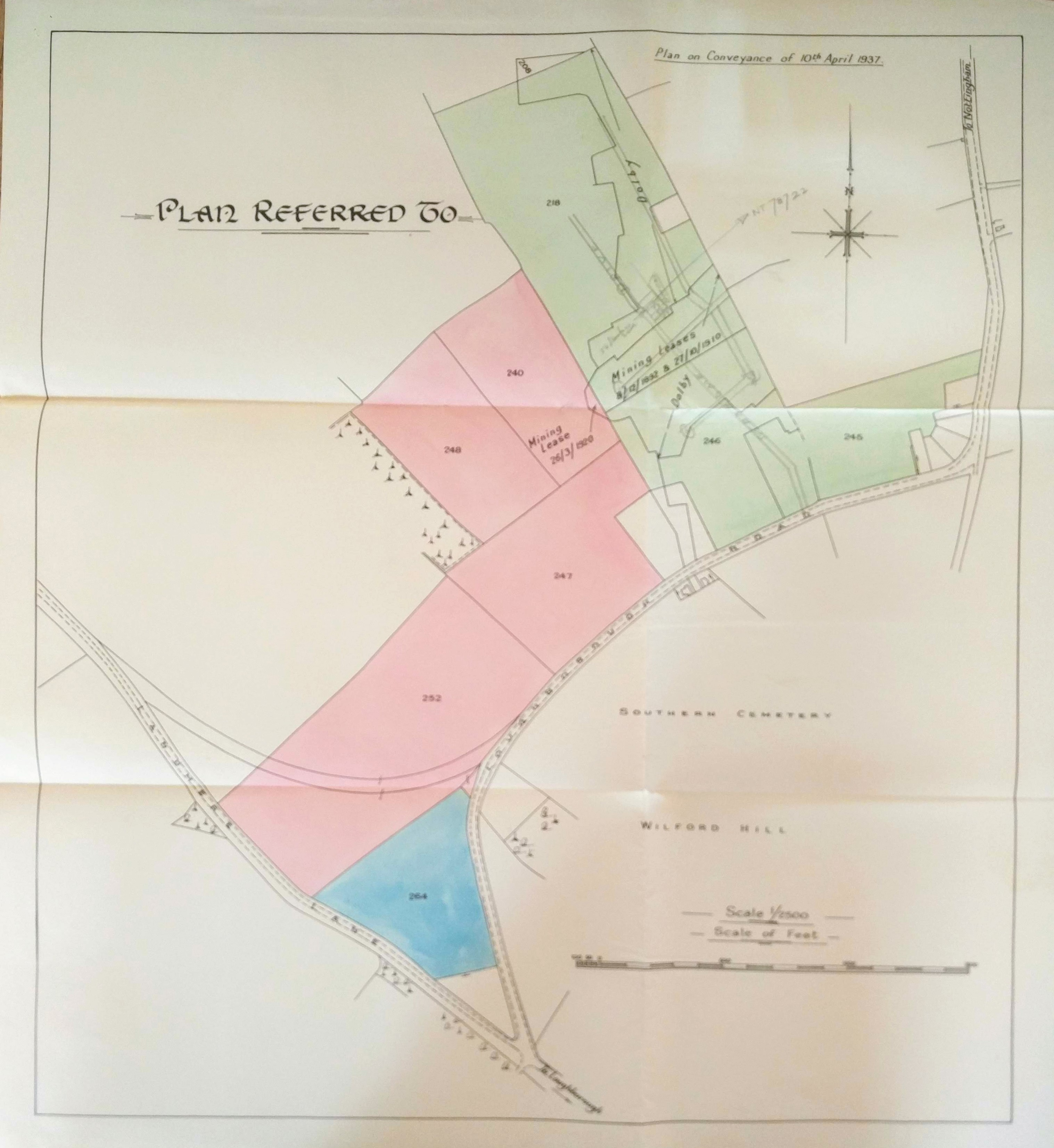

Wilford Hill borders the Compton Acres development as well as the older areas of West Bridgford. It is in the Lutterell Ward of Rushcliffe Borough Council.

As well as being a residential location, the Southern Cemetery and the crematorium for Nottingham is located on 'Wilford Hill' itself.

== Bus services ==
Nottingham City Transport

- 8: Nottingham – West Bridgford – Rushcliffe Leisure Centre – Wilford Hill – West Bridgford – Nottingham.
- 9: Nottingham – West Bridgford – Wilford Hill – Rushcliffe Leisure Centre – West Bridgford – Nottingham.
- 10: Nottingham – ASDA – Greythorne Drive – Wolds Estate – Ruddington.

Nottingham Community Transport

- L2: Silverdale – Clifton – Ruddington – Wolds Estate – Greythorne Drive – West Bridgford – Trent Boulevard – Gamston.
