= Magdala Amateurs F.C. =

Association football club in England

- Full name: Magdala Amateurs Football Club
- Nickname: The Budgies
- Founded: 1904
- Dissolved: 2021
- Ground: Wilford Lane, West Bridgford
- Chairman: John Bentley
- Manager: Tom Groves
- 2020–21: Nottinghamshire Senior League Premier Division (resigned)
Home colours

Magdala Amateurs Football Club was a football club based in West Bridgford, Nottinghamshire, England. The club play their home games behind the ROKO Health Club on Wilford Lane in West Bridgford. The club is affiliated to the Nottinghamshire County Football Association. The club's nickname is The Budgies.

== History ==
The club was formed in 1904, when the reserve side of Notts Magdala F.C. broke away from its parent club to form their own club, and called themselves Notts Magdala Amateurs FC. In 1906 the club changed its name to its current one of Magdala Amateurs F.C. while the original club in 1907 changed its name to Nottinghamshire.

The club played in the FA Amateur Cup in the 1930s.

The 1996–97 season saw the club join Division two of the Notts Alliance league. The following season saw the club promoted to Division one when they finished as runners-up The 2002–03 season then saw them gain promotion to the Senior Division, but they only spent one season in this division when they left the league to join the Senior Division of the newly formed Nottinghamshire Senior League.

In 2013–14 the club finished 8th in the Senior division, but were dropped to Division one the next season. After finishing third in the 2015–16 season the team was promoted back to the Senior division.

The club resigned from the Notts Senior League prior to the 2021–22 season.

== Ground ==
The club played their home games at the ROKO Ground, Wilford Lane in West Bridgford.
