= Lady Bay =

Lady Bay may refer to:

== Australia ==
- Lady Bay (New South Wales), a bay and beach in Watsons Bay, NSW
- Lady Bay (South Australia), a small bay within Port Elliot, SA
- Lady Bay, South Australia, a former shack site near Normanville, SA
- Lady Bay (Victoria), a bay and beach in Warrnambool, Victoria

== United Kingdom ==
- Lady Bay, Nottinghamshire, England
