= Adbolton =

Village in Nottinghamshire, England

Coordinates: 52.939°N 1.109°W

- Location within Nottinghamshire
- Interactive map of Adbolton
- OS grid reference: SK6007638254
- Civil parish: Holme Pierrepont
- District: Rushcliffe
- Shire county: Nottinghamshire
- Region: East Midlands
- Country: England
- Sovereign state: United Kingdom
- Post town: NOTTINGHAM
- Postcode district: NG2
- Police: Nottinghamshire
- Fire: Nottinghamshire
- Ambulance: East Midlands

Adbolton is a village in the English county of Nottinghamshire on the south bank of the River Trent one mile west of Holme Pierrepont.

Adbolton was listed in the Domesday Book of 1086.
