= Farnborough Spencer Academy =

Location
- Farnborough Road; Clifton; Nottingham, Nottinghamshire, NG11 8JW; England
- 52.90942°N 1.16662°W

Information
- Type: Academy
- Motto: "We Are Proud"
- Local authority: Nottingham
- Trust: Spencer Academies Trust
- Department for Education URN: 146564 Tables
- Ofsted: Reports
- Head teacher: Graeme Smith (Executive Principal- Rushcliffe and Farnborough) Mrs S Barker (Head of School)
- Gender: Coeducational
- Age: 11 to 16
- Colors: Black and Yellow
- Website: https://www.farnboroughspencer.com/

Farnborough Spencer Academy is a coeducational secondary school located in the Clifton area of Nottingham in the English county of Nottinghamshire.

The school offers GCSEs as programmes of study for pupils, with a small number of pupils attending Central College Nottingham for vocational courses. It previously held Technology College status as part of the (now defunct) Specialist Schools Programme and also previously had the motto 'Tenez Le Droit. '

Previously a community school administered by Nottingham City Council, in December 2013 an Ofsted inspection judged Farnborough School Technology College to be 'Inadequate'. The rating meant the school was placed in special measures. The school was opened in September 2014 by paralympian Richard Whitehead and was renamed The Farnborough Academy. The 1950s school buildings were demolished and also replaced with a new building designed by Franklin Ellis Architects, one of the last projects built under the Building Schools for the Future programme. It was then operated as part of the Trent Academies Group, however, in September 2018 Trent Academies Group merged with the Spencer Academies Trust. The school then changed its name to Farnborough Spencer Academy in September 2021.

The Academy was graded as Good in all areas by Ofsted in September 2022.
