= Abbey Park, Nottinghamshire =

Housing estate in Rushcliffe, Nottinghamshire, England

Coordinates: 52°55′38″N 1°06′44″W

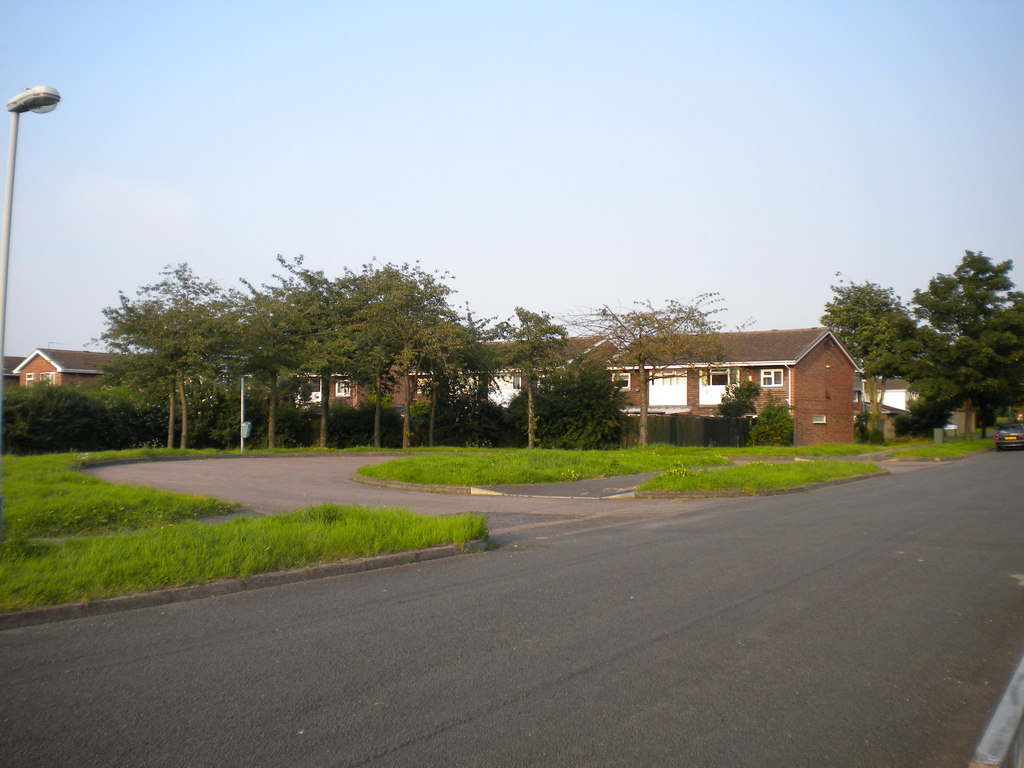
Buckfast Way turning circle, Abbey Park

Abbey Park in West Bridgford is a housing estate that was constructed in the mid–to–late–70s by Costain Homes on land that were previously uncultivated fields and allotments. It is mainly geared people who are aged 55 and older. The Willow Tree pub was constructed at the same time. All the roads are named after famous abbeys and are laid out in a tight, twisty manner that precludes fast driving.

The estate is divided in two, with the majority of homes being constructed for private purchase, while a smaller number were constructed for council tenants.

There is a mix of three-, four- and five-bedroom homes on the privately owned estate in townhouse, semi-detached, link detached, and detached configurations, with a small number of bungalows. This part of Abbey Park consists of Bisham Drive, Dale Close, Newstead Drive, Mountsorrel Drive, Fountains Close, Waltham Close, and Nearsby Drive. The houses are all arranged in cul-de-sacs. The two through-roads on the estate are Rufford Way and Buckfast Way.

The council-funded area consists of Tewkesbury Close, Hexham Close, Bolton Close, and Furness Close, and includes some warden-aided accommodation for the elderly.

Abbey Park is regarded as a pleasant and quiet area of West Bridgford, and house prices are generally at the lower end of the scale for this area. Adjacent Abbey Circus houses a small green band notable for its WW2 air raid shelter, which is still in existence today. Earmarked for demolition in 1979 as the Cold War drew to a close, the 67 ft shelter (B34TYB) was mothballed, but recently added to a list of possible shelters to be re-commissioned in light of recent global unrest.
