= Lady Bay, Nottinghamshire =

Area of West Bridgford, Nottinghamshire, England

Coordinates: 52.938°N 1.119°W

Lady Bay
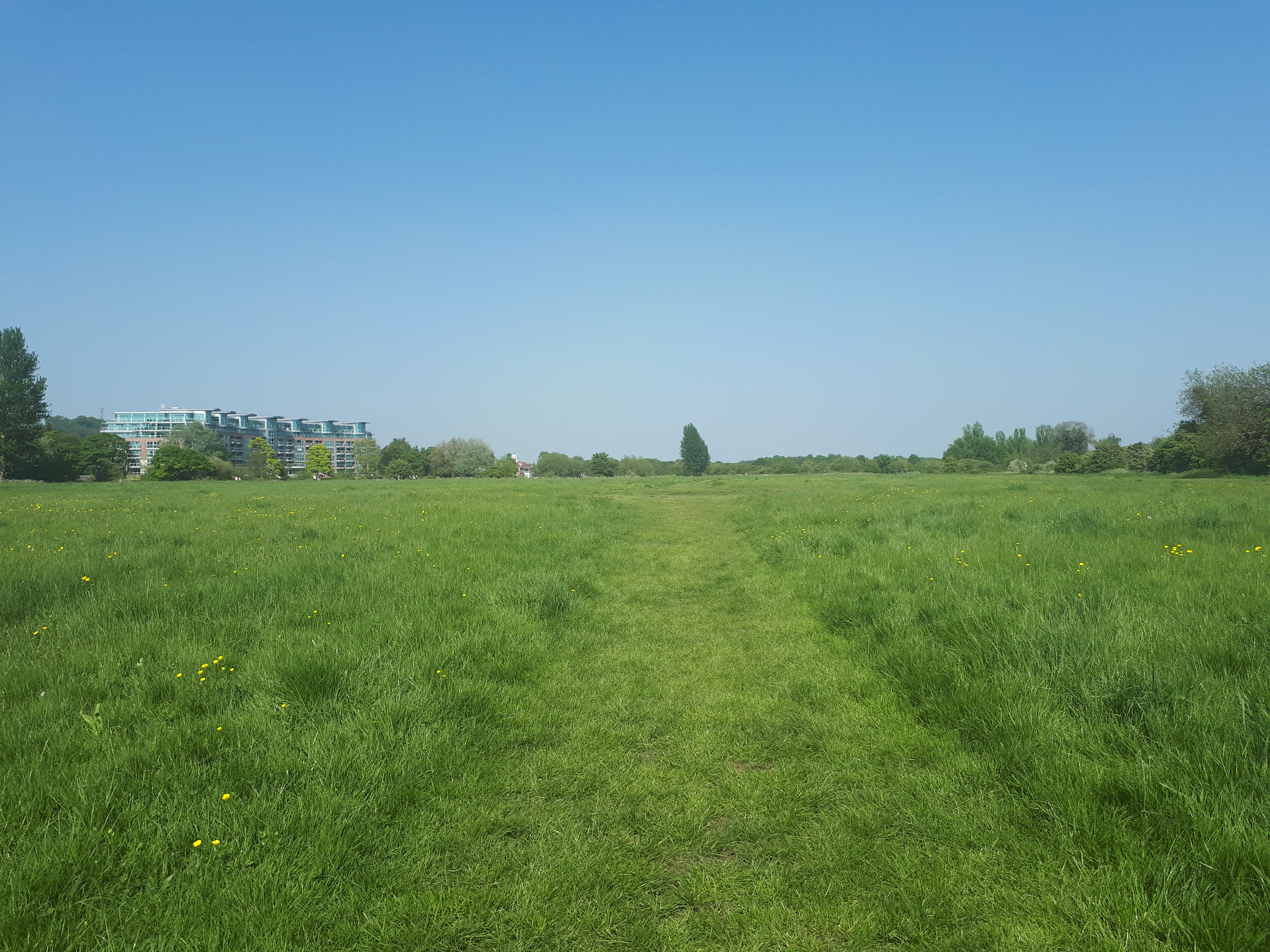
- The Hook in 2018

- Location within Nottinghamshire
- Interactive map of Lady Bay
- OS grid reference: SK 592 382
- District: Rushcliffe
- Shire county: Nottinghamshire
- Region: East Midlands
- Country: England
- Sovereign state: United Kingdom
- Post town: NOTTINGHAM
- Postcode district: NG2
- Dialling code: 0115
- Police: Nottinghamshire
- Fire: Nottinghamshire
- Ambulance: East Midlands
- UK Parliament: Rushcliffe

Lady Bay is an area of Rushcliffe, in Nottinghamshire, England, bounded by the River Trent to the north and the A52 Radcliffe Road to the south. It is within 2 miles of the centre of Nottingham, but is more suburban/semi-rural in its character.

Trent Boulevard is the main thoroughfare running through the centre of Lady Bay, with several small shops, cafes, takeaways, Lady Bay Primary School and the Lady Bay public house fronting on to it. Another pub, the Poppy and Pint, can be found on Pierrepont Road. The area takes the form of a wedge of predominantly residential development, with recent increases in residential land values having driven out the last few remaining non-retail business premises. The parallel road layout intersecting the Boulevard dates back to the late 19th century.

Lady Bay is on the flood plain of the River Trent and has benefited over the years from progressively upgraded flood defences. Between these flood defences (to the north of Holme Road) and the River Trent is an area of statutory washlands known as The Hook. This meadowland provides a habitat for wildlife and a recreational area for local residents; it floods dramatically every 5–10 years, so will never be developed. The Hook was declared a Local Nature Reserve in December 2009. A 'Friends' group has been established and volunteers work to manage and maintain the site.

To the west corner of Lady Bay lies Lady Bay Bridge, a railway bridge built by the Midland Railway Company circa 1880 serving their direct line to Melton Mowbray and beyond to London. With the closure of this line in 1969 the bridge was converted to road use in 1979.

To the east of Lady Bay is the Holme Pierrepont National Watersports Centre.

To the south, beyond the Grantham Canal, lies West Bridgford.

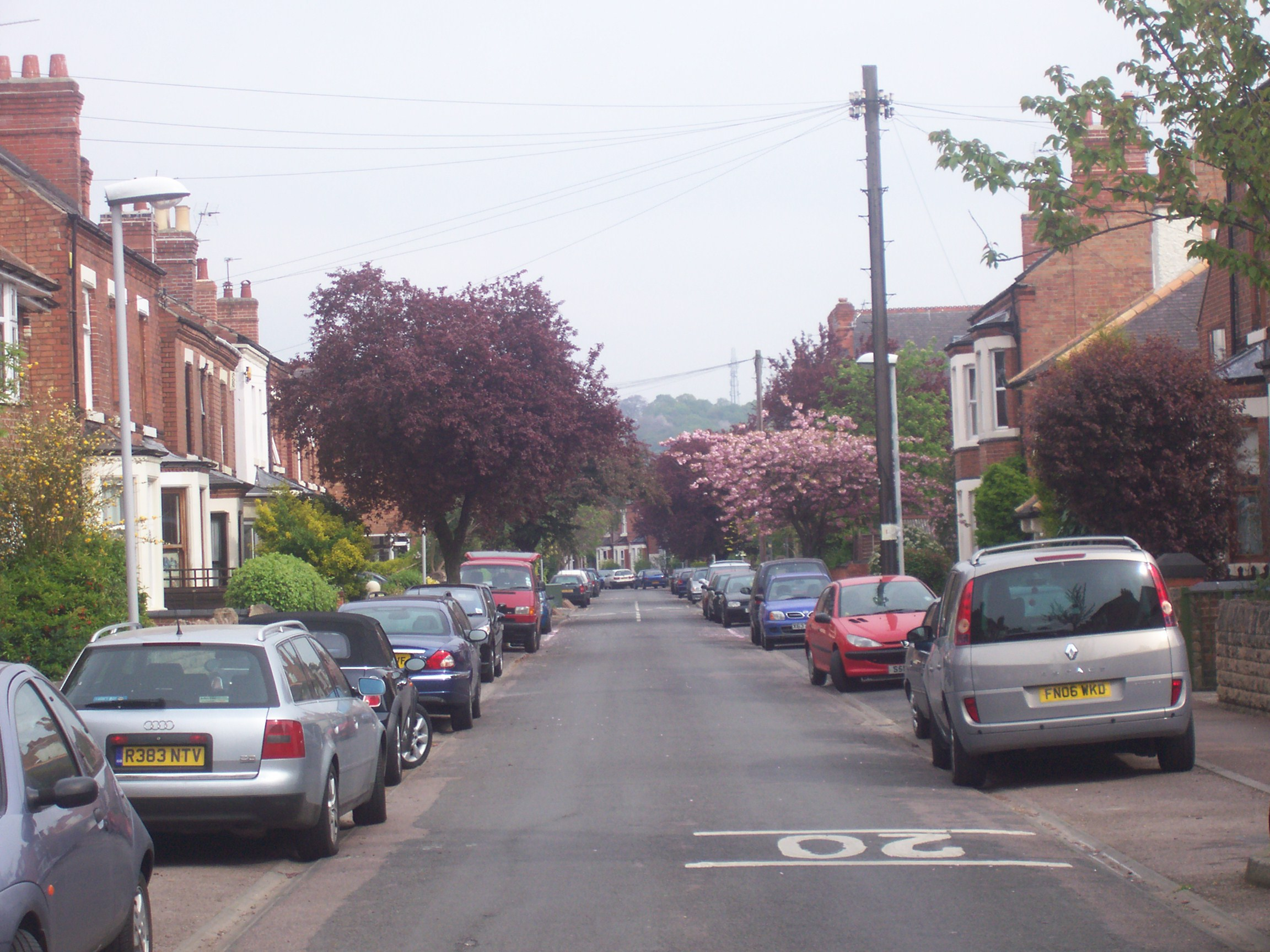
Julian Road

In 1941 a German Luftwaffe bomber dropped a line of bombs across Lady Bay, leading to new houses being built in the 1950-60s on bomb sites in streets of otherwise pre-war housing. The two 'Pinders Ponds' to the east of Lady Bay are also alleged to be as a result of flooded bomb craters. The remains of a disused public air raid shelter is on the corner of Lady Bay Road and Rutland Road.

Lady Bay has an active Church of England parish church, with the Vicar being shared with the adjacent Holme Pierrepont and Adbolton Parish since 2006. All Hallows church on Pierrepont Road was established in 1898 and the present building was designed by William Richard Gleave and dates from 1901. It was made the church of the new Lady Bay parish in 1950.

In Sons and Lovers, D. H. Lawrence describes a visit to a house on Holme Road.

== Bus services ==
Nottingham City Transport

■ 11: Nottingham → Railway Station → Meadows → Trent Bridge → Lady Bay

■ 11C: Nottingham → Railway Station → Meadows → Trent Bridge → Lady Bay → Water Sports Centre

== See also ==
- Lady Bay (disambiguation)
