= Nottingham General Cemetery =

Cemetery in Nottingham, England

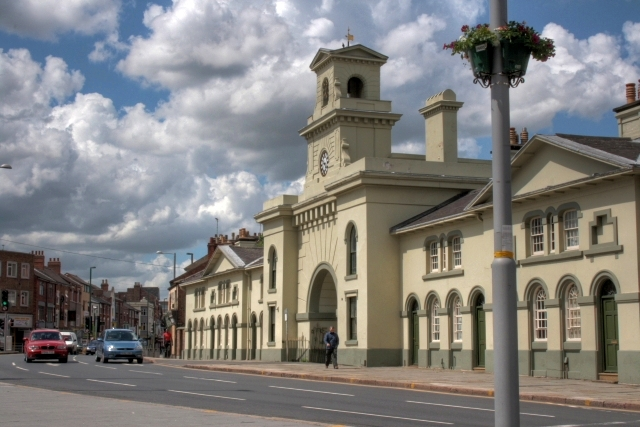
- The cemetery gatehouse and almshouses of 1837-40
- Interactive map of Nottingham General Cemetery

Details
- Established: 1836
- Location: Nottingham
- Country: England
- Coordinates: 52°57′28″N 1°9′32″W
- Owned by: Nottingham City Council
- Size: 18 acres (7.3 ha)
- No. of interments: 150,000+

Nottingham General Cemetery is a place of burial in Nottingham, England which is Grade II listed.

== History ==
The Nottingham General Cemetery Company received Royal Assent for their Act of Parliament on 19 May 1836. The company was founded with 440 shares of £10 each in 1836. A committee of twenty-four directors, which oversaw the cemetery, was chosen annually by the shareholders. The initial committee included the first mayor of the reformed Corporation, Thomas Wakefield. The company acquired 8 acres (3.2 ha) of sloping sandy land north of Tollhouse Hill from the Nottingham Corporation and, wealthy Quaker grocer, Samuel Fox. Around £5,800 was spent on purchasing and developing the site. The directors elected a management committee and appointed a superintendent and other staff, who were based at the company's offices at the cemetery.] The initial site comprised 14 acres (5.7 ha) but in 1845 it was extended by 4 acres (1.6 ha).

In 1837–40, the cemetery gatehouse with almshouses was constructed to the designs of the architect Samuel Sutton Rawlinson at the top of Sion Hill, now Canning Circus. The wrought iron gates were made by Falconer and Company of Derby. Rawlinson also provided two mortuary chapels, one for Anglicans in 1840, and the other for dissenters in ca. 1850.

The laying out of the cemetery was completed by 1838 with a single grave available for 7s 6d (equivalent to £36 in 2025), a private grave the property of the purchaser in perpetuity from £2. 2s (equivalent to £201 in 2025)and upwards, and a brick grave or vault from £10. 10s (equivalent to £1,006 in 2025) and upwards.

In 1923 the Medical Officer of Health expressed concern about the future of the cemetery and a bill was taken to Parliament to prevent new burials except in existing family plots.

After the Second World War, the cemetery company went into liquidation, and after a period of ownership by the Crown, the freehold passed to Nottingham City Council in 1956. The mortuary chapels were both in a state of disrepair and were demolished in 1958.

=== War graves ===
The cemetery contains the war graves of 336 Commonwealth service personnel and one Belgian war grave from World War I, and of 10 from World War II. Most of the dead were from wartime military hospitals in the city. Over 100 of the graves from the first war are in a war graves plot where an adjoining screen wall lists the names. The Commonwealth War Graves Commission continues to maintain the graves.

=== Notable interments ===
- William Booker (architect) 1863
- Ann Taylor (poet) 1866
- Samuel Morley (VC) 1888
- Samuel Cox (minister) 1893
- Bell Taylor surgeon 1909
- Francis Marshall Ward singer 1914
- Henry Harper (architect) 1919
- William Brandreth Savidge architect 1939
- Henry Sulley architect 1940

== See also ==
- Listed buildings in Nottingham (Hyson Green and Arboretum ward)
