= Midlands4Cities =

Midlands4Cities is an AHRC Doctoral Training Partnership (DTP) between the universities of the four cities of Birmingham, Coventry, Leicester and Nottingham in the Midlands.

== History ==
The Midlands4Cities DTP (formerly Midlands3Cities) was set up in 2013 to provide funding and support for doctoral training across the East and West Midlands through a mixture of older and more newly established universities.

== Universities ==
The universities involved are:

- Birmingham City University
- Coventry University
- De Montfort University
- Nottingham Trent University
- University of Birmingham
- University of Leicester
- University of Nottingham
- University of Warwick

== Collaborative partners ==
Midlands4Cities also is working with a number of collaborative partners in the creative industry with a view to working on collaborative research.

- British Film Institute
- British Museum
- Broadway Media Centre
- Central Conservatory of Music (Beijing)
- Cinema Museum
- City Museum Services (Birmingham)
- City Museum Services (Leicester)
- City Museum Services (Nottingham)
- Creative Hinkley
- Creative Leicestershire
- Derbyshire County Council
- Leicestershire County Council
- Leicester Curve
- National Archives
- National Army Museum
- Nottingham Contemporary
- Phoenix Square, Leicester
