= Francis Marshall Ward =

Bass singer, composer and musician

Francis Marshall Ward (26 December 1830 - 5 April 1914) was a bass singer, composer and musician who flourished mainly in Lincolnshire and Nottinghamshire.

== Life ==
He was born on 26 December 1830, the son of Francis Ward (b. 1796) and Jessey Marshall (1796-1946). He was baptised on 24 January 1831 at St Michael’s Church, Lincoln. He was educated as a chorister in Lincoln Cathedral.

On 19 April 1853 he married author Mary Hannah East in St Swithin's Church, Lincoln and they had the following children

- Harry Marshall Ward (1854-1906)
- Elizabeth East Ward (b. 1855)
- Jessie Mary Ward (b. 1857)
- Tom Edgar Ernest Ward (1858-1901)
- Frank Sydney Ward (b. 1860)
- Lily M Ward (b. 1864)
- Nellie Ward (b. 1866)

In 1886 he was appointed conductor of the Philharmonic Choir for the Liverpool Exhibition.

He died on 5 April 1914 at his home, 98 Melton Road, West Bridgford, Nottingham, and on 9 April was buried in the General Cemetery in Nottingham.

== Organist Appointments ==
- St Peter’s Church, Lincoln 1845-1851
- Priory Church of St Mary, Abergavenny 1855-1857
- St Mary le Wigford Lincoln 1857 - ????
- Holy Trinity Church, Lenton, Nottingham 1865 - 1867
- St James' Church, Standard Hill, Nottingham 1867 - ????
- Broad Street Wesleyan Church, Nottingham 1894 - ????

== Compositions ==
His compositions included settings of church services, anthems, songs and part songs, notably “Great and Marvellous”, “I have set the Lord always before me” and “I will give thanks”.
