= Old Town Hall, Bulwell =

Municipal building in Bulwell, Nottinghamshire, England

Old Town Hall
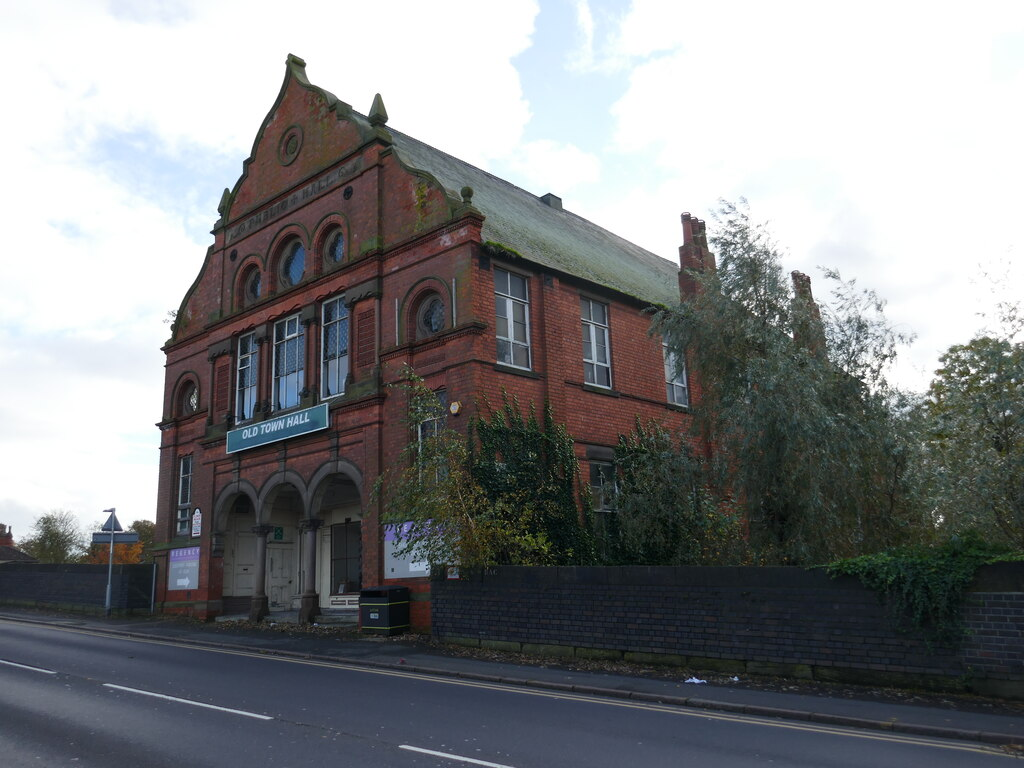
- The building in 2023

- Shown in Nottinghamshire
- 53.0002°N 1.1959°W
- Location: Highbury Road, Bulwell

History
- Built: 1894

Site notes
- Architect: Henry Harper
- Architectural style: Victorian style

The Old Town Hall is a former municipal building in Bulwell, a town in Nottinghamshire, in England. The building, which is in mixed use, is locally listed.

== History ==
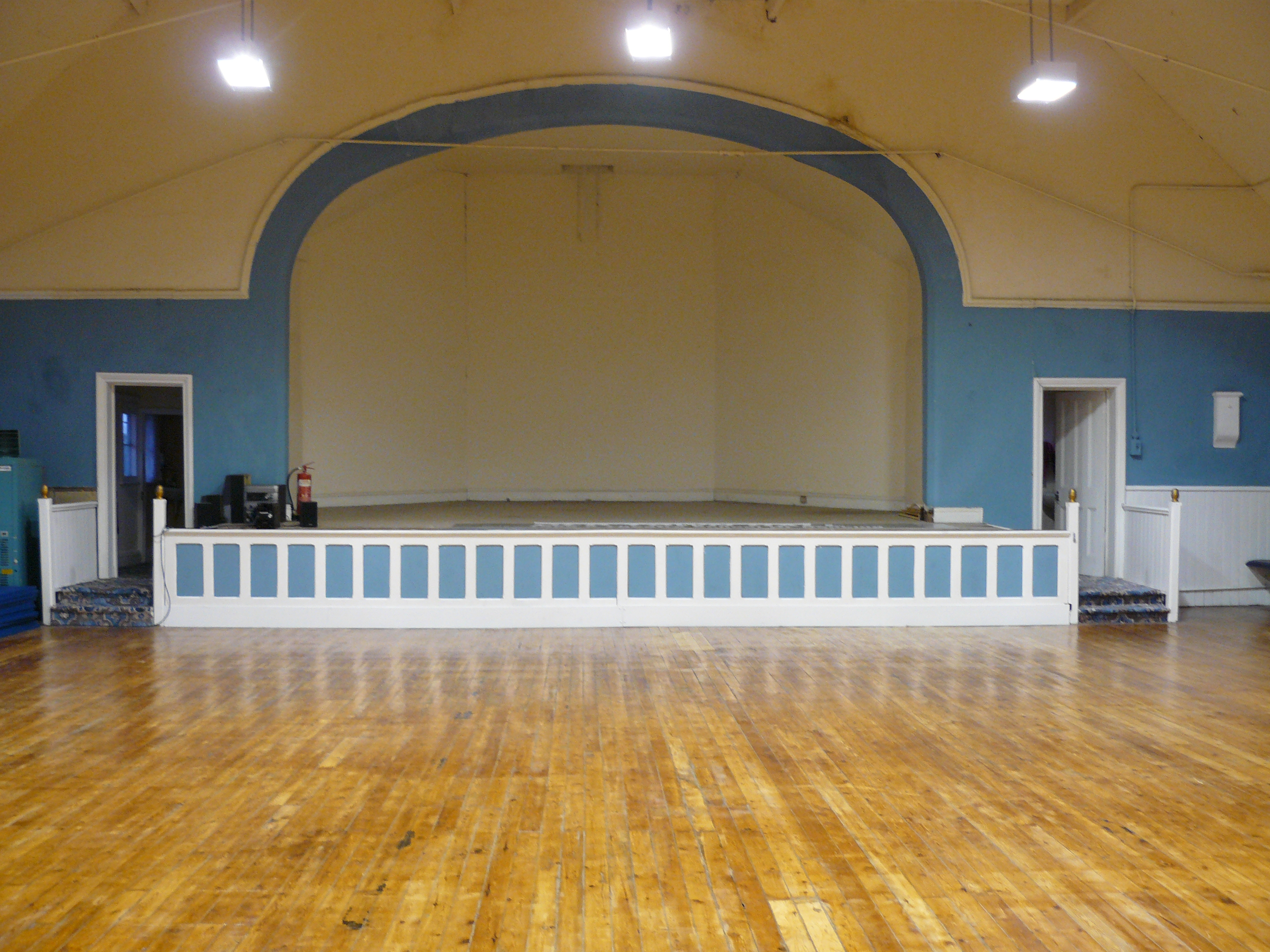
Interior of the concert hall, in 2009

Following significant population growth, largely associated with the brickmaking industry, a local board of health was appointed in Bulwell in the early 1870s. In this context, the new local board of heath decided to commission a town hall. The site they chose on the south side of Highbury Road was adjacent to the River Leen. It appears that some progress was made on the building straight away as the local board of health managed to hold one meeting in the building, before Nottingham Corporation annexed Bulwell on 1 November 1877. However, the new building, which was designed in the Victorian style and built in red brick, was not fully completed until 1894.

The design involved a symmetrical main frontage of five bays facing onto Highbury Road. Because of the elevated position of the main frontage, the rear and side elevations incorporated two additional storeys below ground floor level. On the main frontage, the central section of three bays featured a loggia formed by short Corinthian order columns supporting arches and keystones; on the first floor, there were three casement windows flanked by pairs of Corinthian order columns supporting an entablature and a dentiled cornice. Above that, there were three round headed openings containing quatrefoils, flanked by pilasters supporting another entablature and a pair of finials. The outer bays contained casement windows on the ground floor and more rounded headed openings containing quatrefoils on the first floor. The whole structure was surmounted by a Dutch gable with an oculus in the tympanum. Internally, the principal room was a concert hall with a small gallery and a proscenium arch.

The building, which opened to the public as the Bulwell Public Hall, was initially used for concerts and variety performances, and then, in the early 20th century, it was used as a cinema, holding dance nights for local dancing enthusiasts. After the Second World War, the building operated as the Embassy Ballroom. A large extension to create extra office space was added in the 1970s.

Later in the 20th century, a more diverse range of tenants was introduced. A furniture showroom, Regency Mouldings and Fireplaces, became the main tenant on the ground floor in 1989. Since the start of the 21st century, the concert hall has been used by the "Take 5 Theatre School of Dancing", and a boxing and kickboxing facility, the Bulwell Fight Factory, has used the space since 2012. A range of commercial tenants, including a branch of Swinton Insurance, have occupied the office space in the complex.
