= Robert Eli Hooppell =

Robert Eli Hooppell (30 January 1833 – 23 August 1895) was an English cleric and antiquarian.

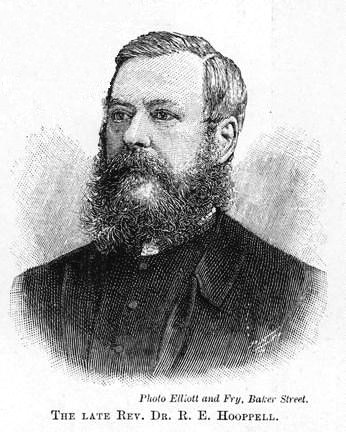
Robert Eli Hooppell

== Early life ==
Born in the parish of St. Mary, Rotherhithe, Surrey, on 30 January 1833, he was the son of John Eli and Mary Ann Hooppell. He was educated at St Olave's Grammar School in Southwark, and was admitted sizar at St John's College, Cambridge, on 30 June 1851. He was also a scholar of the college. In 1855 he graduated B.A., and in 1856 he obtained a first-class in the Moral Sciences Tripos. He proceeded M.A. in 1858, LL.D. in 1865, and was admitted ad eundem at Durham University.

== Educator ==
From 1855 to 1861 Hooppell was second and mathematical master at Beaumaris Grammar School. He was ordained deacon in 1857, and priest in 1859, and from 1859 to 1861 he served as English chaplain at Menai Bridge. On the foundation at South Shields in 1861 of Winterbottom Nautical College he was appointed the first principal, and he remained in the position until 1875, when he was instituted to the rectory of Byers Green, County Durham. In 1865 he was elected a fellow of the Royal Astronomical Society. From 1869 Hooppell was President of the short-lived Observing Astronomical Society.

== Activist ==
Hooppell protested about the Contagious Diseases Acts in May 1868, and became involved in agitation against them in 1869 at the Social Science Congress, where with Bell Taylor, a recruit to his cause through a newspaper article, helped him run a fringe meeting. He held meetings for working-class men to show them how the Acts meant their wives might be examined, an approach disliked by the campaigner and ally Josephine Butler.

In March 1870 Hooppell started a weekly journal, The Shield, calling for repeal of the Acts. The issue was hard to air in print, and the first number of The Shield pointed out that the Pall Mall Gazette was not printing answers to a letter it had published by Elizabeth Garrett, a supporter of the Acts. Then in August The Shield was moved to London publication, and Hooppell started a successor, The Torch.

In 1871 Hooppell read a paper to the British Association on The Statistical Results of the Contagious Diseases Acts. Hooppell was in the habit of showing a speculum at public meetings, but this worked against him in 1872, because Butler found his behaviour extreme; and Henry J. Wilson was chosen instead as secretary of the Northern Counties League for Repeal.

Hooppell was also an advocate of temperance. He found his views brought him social ostracism.

== Later life ==
In 1884 Hooppell was an unsuccessful candidate for the Chair of Political Economy at Cambridge. For the last year or two of his life he was in poor health, and wintered at Bournemouth. He died there at the Burlington, Oxford Road, on 23 August 1895, and was buried in Bournemouth cemetery.

== Works ==
Hooppell served on the committee superintending the excavation of Arbeia at South Shields. His paper on the discoveries there led on to a lecture, published in 1879, on Vinovium, the buried Roman City at Binchester, on Vinovia, between Bishop Auckland and Byers Green, and in 1891 Vinovia, a buried Roman City, with thirty-eight illustrations. Some of the material appeared in the Journal of the British Archæological Association, and he contributed there in 1895 a paper on Roman Manchester and the Roads to and from it.

From 1877 Hooppell read papers on the names of Roman stations to the Newcastle Society of Antiquaries, and he contributed to Archæologia Æliana and the Illustrated Archæologist. His address as president of the Tyneside Naturalists' Field Club, is in the Natural History Transactions of Northumberland (vii. 187-206); and after his death Rambles of an Antiquary was published in 1898, a series of papers in the Newcastle Courant for 1880 and 1881, mainly on antiquities of Northumberland and Durham.

Hooppell also published, in addition to sermons, Reason and Religion, or the leading Doctrines of Christianity, 1867; 2nd ed. 1895; and Materialism, has it any real Foundation in Science? 2nd ed. 1874.

== Family ==
Hooppell married at Broxbourne, Hertfordshire, on 20 June 1855, Margaret, daughter of Samuel and Elizabeth Hooppell of Fishleigh, Devon; she survived him with two sons and one daughter, and was a suffragist.

== Notes ==
Attribution

This article incorporates text from a publication now in the public domain: Lee, Sidney, ed. (1901). "Hooppell, Robert Eli". Dictionary of National Biography (1st supplement). Vol. 2. London: Smith, Elder & Co.
