= Samuel Cox (minister) =

English nonconformist divine and Christian universalist

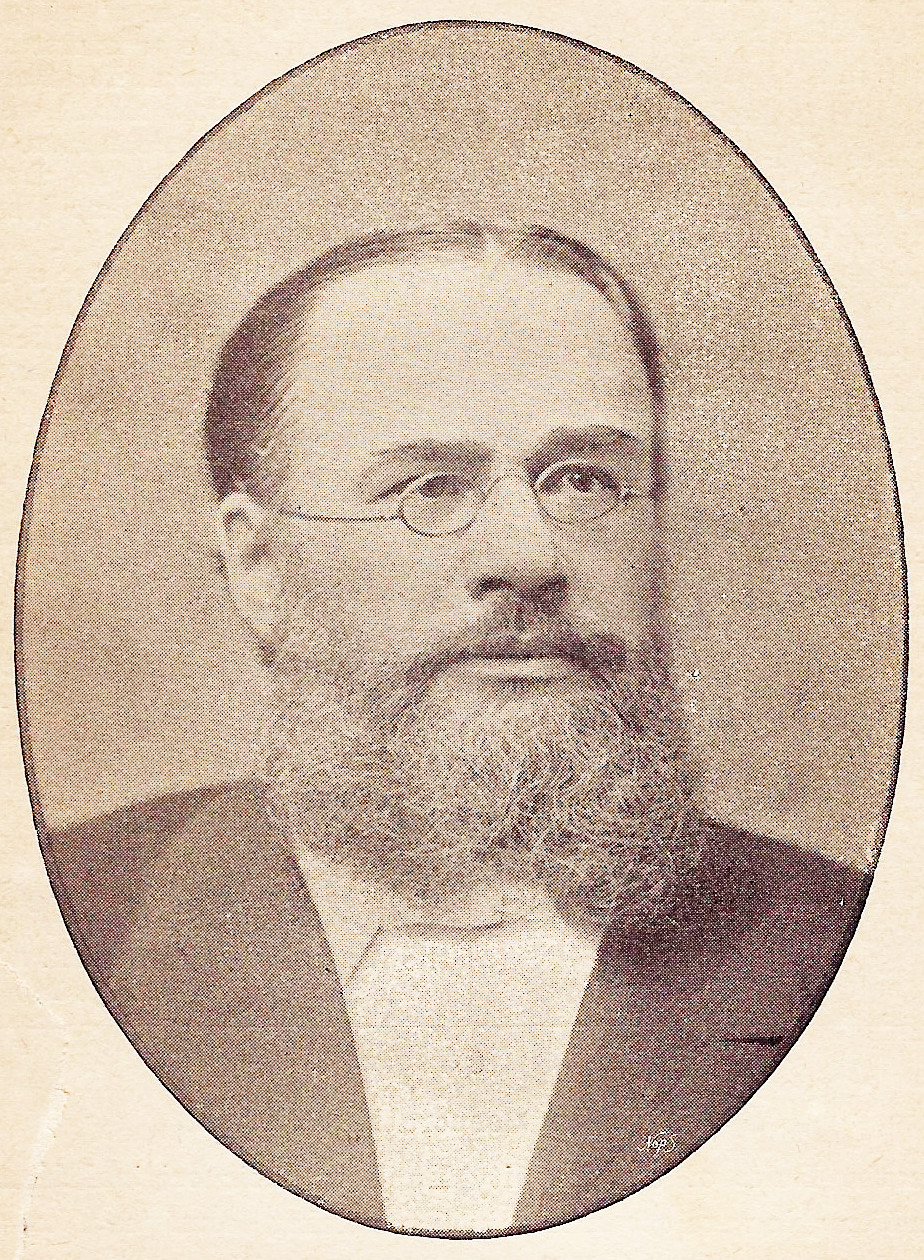
Samuel Cox. Picture used with kind permission of the Angus Library and Archive, Regent’s Park College.

Samuel Cox (19 April 1826 – 27 March 1893) was an English nonconformist divine and Christian universalist, born in London.

== Biography ==
He was born on 19 April 1826 near London, and educated at a school at Stoke Newington. At the age of fourteen he was apprenticed at the London docks, where his father was employed, but on the end of his indentures he resigned his position and entered the Stepney College to prepare himself for the Baptist ministry.

After passing the college course and matriculating at London University, Cox became in 1852 pastor of the Baptist chapel in St. Paul's Square, Southsea. In 1854 he accepted an invitation to Ryde, Isle of Wight, where he remained till 1859.

A disorder in the throat compelled him to desist from preaching, and caused him to turn his attention seriously to literature. He wrote for the Freeman, the organ of the Baptists, and occasionally acted as editor, and became a contributor to the Nonconformist, the Christian Spectator, the Quiver, and other religious periodicals. In 1861, he was appointed secretary to the committee for arranging the bicentenary of the Great Ejection of 1662. However the throat delicacy proved less permanent than had been feared, and in 1863 he accepted a call to the pastorate of the Mansfield Road Baptist chapel, Nottingham, a position he occupied successfully and happily till 1888, when failing health compelled his resignation.

He was president of the Baptist Association in 1873 and received the degree of DD from St Andrews in 1882.

He retired to Hastings, where he died on 27 March 1893.

He was buried in the general cemetery at Nottingham.

== Family ==
In 1873 he married Eliza Tebbutt of Bluntisham, Huntingdonshire.

== Assessment ==
Although Cox's ministry was effective and zealous, his chief activity was as a writer. His resumption of ministerial work in 1863 did not interfere with his literary energy, which led to his undertaking in 1875 the editorship of the Expositor. The conception of this monthly magazine was evolved by Cox from his own work as a preacher and writer on the Bible. He was editor till 1884, being responsible for Volumes I to XX, some of which he wrote almost entirely himself. But he gathered round him a distinguished staff, including such men as Drs. Magee, Farrar, Marcus Dods, and Professor Robertson Smith. The influence of the magazine upon religious thought in England can hardly be over-estimated. Its general tendency is perhaps best indicated by a sentence in Cox's own exposition of his aims in the first number: 'Our sole purpose is to expound the scriptures honestly and intelligently by permitting them to explain themselves; neither thrusting upon them miracles which they do not claim or dogmas to which they lend no support, nor venturing to question the doctrines they obviously teach or the miracles which they plainly affirm.' Cox's services to learning received the remarkable recognition of nearly simultaneous offers from Aberdeen, Edinburgh, and St. Andrews Universities of their degree of D.D. In 1882, Cox accepted the D.D. from St Andrews. He found himself compelled after 1884 to resign his editorship, as the breadth of his views had become displeasing to the proprietors of the magazine.

== Works ==
Cox wrote that he was the writer of thirty volumes and the editor of twenty more. He had gifts as a biblical expositor and was the founder and first editor of a monthly journal The Expositor (1875–1884). Among the best known of his numerous theological publications are Salvator Mundi: Or, Is Christ the Saviour of All Men? (1877); A Commentary on the Book of Job (1880); and The Larger Hope (1883).

Among his other works, usually "by S. C.", were:

- The Secret of Life: being eight Sermons preached at Nottingham, London, 1866.
- The Private Letters of St. Paul and St. John, London, 1867. This book, well reviewed by George Macdonald in The Spectator, was Cox's first success as an author.
- The Quest of the Chief Good: Expository Lectures on the Book Ecclesiastes, London, 1868; this was rewritten for the Expositor's Bible and published in 1890 as The Book of Ecclesiastes, with a New Translation.
- The Resurrection. Twelve Expository Essays on the Fifteenth Chapter of St. Paul's First Epistle to the Corinthians, London, 1869.
- Sermons for my Curates, by Thomas Toke Lynch (1871), editor.
- An Expositor's Note-Book; or, Brief Essays on Obscure or Misread Scriptures, London, 1872.
- Biblical Expositions; or, Brief Essays on Obscure or Misread Scriptures, London, 1874; this is effectively a second volume of the above.
- The Pilgrim Psalms, an Exposition of the Songs of Degrees, London, 1874.
- The Book of Ruth. A Popular Exposition, London.
- Expository Essays and Discourses, London, 1877.
- Salvator Mundi; or, Is Christ the Saviour of all Men? London, 1877. This was the most widely read and most influential work. It was followed in 1883 by a sequel, The Larger Hope, London; in which the author defined his position on universalism, and answered some critics. The Doctrines of Annihilation and Universalism . . . With critical notes and a Review of "Salvator Mundi" (London, 1881), by Thomas Wood was a retort. Its postscript of challenges Cox's impartiality as editor of the Expositor, an instance of the sort of complaint that brought about his resignation.
- A Commentary on the Book of Job, with a Translation, London, 1880.
- The Genesis of Evil, and other Sermons, mainly Expository, London, 1880.
- Balaam: an Exposition and a Study, London, 1884.
- Miracles: an Argument and a Challenge, London, 1884.
- Expositions, London, 1885; this continued over four volumes.
- The Bird's Nest and other Sermons for Children of all Ages, London, 1886.
- The House and its Builder, with other Discourses, London, 1889.
- The Hebrew Twins: a Vindication of God's Ways with Jacob and Esau. By Cox, Prefatory Memoir by his wife Eliza Cox, London, 1894.

His papers are held at the University of Nottingham.
