= Listed buildings in Nottingham (Hyson Green and Arboretum ward) =

Hyson Green and Arboretum is an electoral ward in the city of Nottingham, England. The ward contains over 60 listed buildings that are recorded in the National Heritage List for England. Of these, two are listed at Grade II*, the middle of the three grades, and the others are at Grade II, the lowest grade. The ward is to the north of the centre of the city, and includes the areas of Hyson Green and Arboretum. In the ward are buildings forming part of Nottingham Trent University, some of which are listed. The ward contains the open areas of Nottingham General Cemetery, the Forest Recreation Ground, The Arboretum and Church Cemetery, all of which contain listed buildings. In the past, the area was involved with the lace making industry, and in the ward are former workshops and factories that have been converted for other uses and are listed. The other listed buildings include houses, offices, shops, warehouses, war memorials, churches and associated structures, Nottingham High School, and a theatre.

== Key ==
Grade	Criteria
II*	Particularly important buildings of more than special interest
II	Buildings of national importance and special interest

== Buildings ==
Name and location	Photograph	Date	Notes	Grade
84 Derby Road; 52.95558°N 1.15900°W		Late 18th century	A house, later a shop and offices, in painted brick on a plinth, with a floor band, moulded eaves, and a slate roof. There are three storeys and three bays. In the centre is a doorway with a fanlight, to its left is a 19th-century shop front with pilasters, and elsewhere are sash windows. The openings have wedge lintels and most have keystones.	II
238 Alfreton Road; 52.96156°N 1.17012°W	—	Early 19th century	A house with a lacemaker's workshop above, in red brick, the basement rendered, with stucco dressings, floor bands, and a tile roof. There are three storeys and a basement, and a single bay. The round-headed doorway has a moulded surround and a fanlight. To its right, and in the middle floor, is a sash window with a reeded wedge lintel and a keystone. In the top floor is a seven-light workshop casement window, and there is a similar window at the rear.	II
62–68 Derby Road; 52.95541°N 1.15824°W		Early 19th century	A group of four houses, later shops, on a corner site, in red brick, with painted stone dressings, a sill band, wooden eaves and slate roofs. There are three storeys, seven bays on the front, two on the right return and a curved bay on the corner. In the ground floor are shop fronts, and the upper floors contain sash windows with wedge lintels.	II
Mount Hooton; 52.96303°N 1.16071°W		Early 19th century	A terrace of ten houses and a shop, in brick with a hipped slate roof. There are three storeys and a basement at the north end, and ten bays. Most of the windows are top-hung casements with stucco wedge lintels. At the north end is a stuccoed basement containing a shop front with a cornice, and to its right is a doorway with a hood on shaped brackets.	II
Canning Terrace including cemetery gateway 52.95613°N 1.16158°W		1836–40	This consists of the gateway to Nottingham General Cemetery flanked by almshouses, forming a symmetrical range in stuccoed brick with slate roofs. The gatehouse has a recessed rusticated centre and a round carriage arch under a dentilled cornice, and above is a square clock tower surmounted by a round-arched bell turret with pediments. Flanking the arch are projecting bays containing windows with hood moulds, those in the upper floor with round heads. Each range of almshouses has two storeys and three bays, the middle bay pedimented. In the ground floor are arcades of round headed openings with a continuous hood mould, and the upper floor windows are tripartite.	II
Churchill Memorial, Nottingham General Cemetery; 52.95644°N 1.16052°W		1838	The monument is to the memory of a director of the cemetery who died in the wreck of the Forfarshire. It is in stone, and consists of a truncated obelisk on an inscribed square pedestal and base.	II
Steps south of Churchill Memorial, Nottingham General Cemetery; 52.95643°N 1.16055°W		1838	A flight of four stone steps to the south of the memorial, with two coped round pedestals at the foot.	II
10–18 and 22–30 Clarendon Street; 52.95683°N 1.15681°W		c. 1840	A terrace of houses, later offices, in red brick on a plinth, with a wooden eaves cornice and slate roofs. There are three storeys and 15 bays. In the ground floor are alternating paired windows and doors, most of the windows are sashes with flat brick aches, and the doorways have fanlights. The upper floor contains windows and blanks. No. 30, on the left, projects and has two bays, and a curved brick garden wall with chamfered coping, and in the 11th bay is a canted bay window.	II
Mount Vernon Terrace, walls and railings 52.96214°N 1.16151°W		c. 1840	A terrace of four houses, with a tower added at the rear in about 1865 by T. C. Hine. The houses are in red brick on a plinth, with stucco dressings, quoins, a decorative dentilled eaves cornice, and roofs of slate and tile. There are three storeys and eight bays. The doorways have round-arched heads, pilasters and a cornice. Each house has a balustraded canted bay window, the one on the left with two storeys. Most of the other windows are sashes with moulded surrounds, those in the middle floor with alternating triangular and segmental pediments. The tower is square, with a wooden gallery on three sides, and a pyramidal roof. The wall in front of the terrace is in brick, mostly rendered, with stone coping, and partly with spearhead railing. The gateway to each house has rusticated square piers with cornice caps.	II
4 and 6 Forest Road East; 52.96375°N 1.16006°W		c. 1845	A pair of houses in Italianate style, in brick, stuccoed on the front, on a plinth, with stone dressings, an eaves cornice, a blocking course, and a slate roof. There are two storeys and attics, a T-shaped plan, and four bays. The middle two bays project under a pediment, and on the front are paired giant pilasters. The windows are sashes, in the ground floor they are tripartite with pediments, in the upper floor are triple windows with round-arched lights, and in the pediment are two round-arched lights. The recessed outer bays contain a doorway with a fanlight and a round-arched light above.	II
8 and 10 Forest Road East; 52.96366°N 1.16038°W		c. 1845	A pair of houses in Italianate style, in brick, stuccoed on the front, on a plinth, with stone dressings, an eaves cornice, a blocking course, and a slate roof. There are two storeys and attics, a T-shaped plan, and four bays. The middle two bays project under a pediment, and on the front are paired giant pilasters. The windows are sashes, in the ground floor they are tripartite with pediments, in the upper floor are triple windows with round-arched lights, and in the pediment are two round-arched lights. The recessed outer bays contain a doorway with a fanlight and a round-arched light above.	II
12 and 14 Forest Road East; 52.96358°N 1.16070°W		c. 1845	A pair of houses in Italianate style, in brick, stuccoed on the front, on a plinth, with stone dressings, an eaves cornice, a blocking course, and a slate roof. There are two storeys and attics, a T-shaped plan, and four bays. The middle two bays project under a pediment, and on the front are paired giant pilasters. The windows are sashes, in the ground floor they are tripartite with pediments, in the upper floor are triple windows with round-arched lights, and in the pediment are two round-arched lights. The recessed outer bays contain a doorway with a fanlight and a round-arched light above.	II
Gate Piers at the west entrance to the Forest Recreation Ground; 52.96335°N 1.16372°W		Mid 19th century	The gate piers are in Bulwell stone. They are square, with chamfered corners, rock-faced bases, foliage cornices and pyramidal caps with cross-gables.	II
Gateway, walls and railings at the entrance to The Arboretum; 52.95957°N 1.15738°W		1851	The structures at the entrance were designed by Henry Moses Wood, and are in Tudor Revival style. There are four octagonal panelled stone piers with ogee domes and finials, and between them are wrought iron gates. Flanking them are stone serpentine screen walls with a plinth and moulded coping, ending in similar piers. Extending to the left for about 400 metres (1,300 ft) is a cast iron spiked railing.	II
Lodge at the southwest entrance to The Arboretum; 52.95957°N 1.15726°W		1851	The lodge by the entrance was designed by Henry Moses Wood in Tudor Revival style. It is in red brick with blue brick diapering, stone dressings, a patterned tile roof with tile cresting, and a gable with a bargeboard and a finial. There are two storeys and a T-shaped plan, with fronts of one and two bays. On the front is a canted stone bay window, with inscribed tablets on the parapet and a finial. In the left return is a canted bay window with a hipped roof, and in the right return is a doorway with a fanlight.	II
Lodge, gate and walls at east entrance to The Arboretum; 52.96255°N 1.15231°W		1851–52	The structures at the entrance were designed by Henry Moses Wood. There are four square stone gate piers with traceried panels and pyramidal caps, and three cast iron gates. Leading from these are concave screen walls with chamfered coping and a cast iron railing, and similar end piers. The lodge is in red brick with stone dressings and a tile roof. There are two storeys, an L-shaped plan, and two bays. In the front facing the drive is a canted bay window, and in the right return is a doorway.	II
Subway, railings and walls, The Arboretum; 52.96241°N 1.15462°W		1851–52	The pedestrian subway and associated structures were designed by Henry Moses Wood. The subway is a tunnel with a four-centred arch head extending for about 20 metres (66 ft). It is in stone, flanked by buttresses, and has a moulded sill. The low parapet walls have chamfered coping and a spiked cast iron railing, and the boundary walls extend for about 100 metres (330 ft).	II
Walls and stairs, Church Cemetery; 52.96534°N 1.15560°W		1851–56	The retaining walls and stairway are in Bulwell stone. The wall is curved and contains continuous pointed arches divided by buttresses, and has a coped parapet wall. On the northeast side is a tunnel entrance, and on the northwest side is a stairway on segmental-pointed arches, flanked by a balustrade wall with stepped coping.	II
Clarendon Chambers; 52.95729°N 1.15708°W		1853	A block of offices on a corner site that was extended in about 1899 and in 1905. The buildings are in red brick and stone, with stone dressings, quoins, a floor band, an eaves cornice, and slate roofs with crested ridge tiles, and coped shaped gables with finials. There are two storeys and an L-shaped plan, with fronts of seven and eight bays. Most of the windows are casement windows with mullions. On the corner is a pavilion with rusticated quoins, and on each front is a canted oriel window.	II
Former Wesleyan Reform chapel and railings 52.95804°N 1.15200°W		1854	The chapel, which as designed by Thomas Simpson and later used for other purposes, is stuccoed, with a sill band, a string course and a hipped slate roof. There are two storeys and a basement, and fronts of three and seven bays. The bays are divided by giant Corinthian pilasters, those on the entrance front are fluted. Steps lead up to the entrance, which has a window flanked by doorways, above which are three round-headed windows, a dentilled cornice and pediment. At the rear is a flat-roofed extension. The area is enclosed by a wrought iron railing on a stone plinth, and along the entrance front are four square panelled piers with cornice caps and wrought iron gates.	II
Statue of Feargus O'Connor; 52.96177°N 1.15493°W		1859	The statue of Feargus O'Connor is in The Arboretum. It consists of a life-side standing figure in marble on an inscribed square sandstone pedestal with a plinth and a cornice, on a rock-faced stone base.	II
Gate piers and screen walls at entrance to Waterloo Promenade, Southey Street (northeast); 52.96143°N 1.16607°W		Mid to late 19th century	At the entrance to the promenade are two square piers with chamfered corners, moulded plinths, and massive square caps with decorative segmental pediments, surmounted by the remains of cast iron lamps. Between the piers is a low stone wall with a railing, extending for about 6 metres (20 ft).	II
Gate piers and screen walls at entrance to Waterloo Promenade, Southey Street (southwest); 52.96137°N 1.16612°W		Mid to late 19th century	Flanking the entrance to the promenade are two square piers with chamfered corners, moulded plinths, and massive square caps with decorative segmental pediments, surmounted by the remains of cast iron lamps. Outside the piers is a low stone wall with a railing, ending at a square pier with a moulded plinth and a concave-sided pyramidal cap.	II
War memorial, The Arboretum; 52.96126°N 1.15554°W		1862–63	The memorial to the Crimean War was designed by M. Ogle Tarbotton, It consists of a rectangular platform in pink sandstone, on a plinth, with inscriptions, and at each corner is a cannon on a stone base. The centre is an octagonal pagoda, with a swept octagonal spire, round columns with traceried brackets and a frieze with inscriptions.	II
Terrace Royal; 52.95847°N 1.15655°W		1863	A terrace of eight houses, later offices, in red brick on a plinth, with dressings in limestone and blue lias, quoins, an impost band, a dogtooth eaves band with gargoyles, and a slate roof. There are three storeys and attics, and fronts of 16 and three bays, with four projecting bays under coped gables. The doorways have cusped pointed arched heads, shafts, carved spandrels, and a hood mould, and the windows are casements in differing Gothic surrounds. Outside, there are stone steps with brick balustrade walls and stone copings.	II
All Saints' Church; 52.96022°N 1.16131°W		1863–64	The church was designed by T. C. Hine and R. Evans in Gothic Revival style. It is built in rock-faced stone with bands of sandstone, and has tile roofs. The church consists of a nave with a clerestory, north and south aisles, north and south porches, north and south transepts, a baptistry, an apsidal chancel with a vestry and a chapel, and a west steeple. The steeple has a tower with three stages, buttresses, a round stair turret with a spire at the southwest corner, a large three-light west window, lancet windows, three-light bell openings, and an octagonal broach spire with two tiers of lucarnes.	II
All Saints' Vicarage; 52.96026°N 1.16205°W		1863–64	The vicarage, later divided, was designed by T. C. Hine and R. Evans in Gothic Revival style. It is in Bulwell sandstone on a chamfered plinth, with stone dressings, and a tile roof with coped gables and kneelers. There are two storeys and attics, a double range plan, and fronts of two and three bays. On the garden front is a projecting gabled two-storey porch and a pointed arched doorway with sidelights under a polychrome relieving arch. Most of the windows are sashes with cusped pointed arched heads, and there are canted bay windows, and a through-eaves dormer.	II
Waverley Building, Nottingham Trent University; 52.95935°N 1.15664°W		1863–65	Originally an art college designed by Frederick Bakewell in Italianate style. It is in stone on a plinth, with a rusticated ground floor, quoins, a modillion eaves cornice on brackets, an encaustic tile frieze, a balustrade with pedestals, and a slate roof. There are two storeys and a basement, and seven bays. In the middle bay is a square two-storey tower porch, above which is a square tower with traceried windows, clock faces, a square tiled dome, and a turret finial. The openings have round-arched heads, the windows are casements, and the upper floor windows have busts of architects and artists on the quoins.	II
All Saints Workplace Units; 52.95979°N 1.16157°W		1864–65	A teacher's house, later used for other purposes, designed by T. C. Hine and R. Evans in Gothic Revival style. It is in Bulwell stone on a plinth, and has a tile roof with coped gables. There are two storeys, two gabled bays, and a double range plan. The entrance has three arches with marble columns, and the windows have cusped pointed arches and stone mullions. On the right is a stair turret with a tall conical cap.	II
Community centre and workspace units, All Saints' Church; 52.95994°N 1.16192°W		1864–65	Church schools designed by T. C. Hine and R. Evans in Gothic Revival style, and later used for other purposes. They are in Bulwell stone on a plinth, with banded tile roofs. The building is in one and two storeys with an L-shaped plan, and has ranges of four bays. The windows have cusped pointed-arched lights and stone mullions. On the northeast is a round bell tower with buttresses, and a tiled conical spire.	II
Wall, gateways and railings, All Saints' Church; 52.95992°N 1.16121°W		1864–65	The structures were designed by T. C. Hine and R. Evans. The churchyard wall is in rock-faced Bulwell stone, on a plinth, and has moulded coping. In the Raleigh Street section is a gateway with a pointed arch, a crow-stepped gable and a finial, containing wrought iron gates. To its left is a gateway with square piers and pyramidal caps, and similar gates. On All Saints Street is a gateway with cast iron sliding gates and railings.	II
Theatre Royal; 52.95534°N 1.15141°W		1865	The theatre was designed by C. J. Phipps, and extended in 1884 by Phipps, in 1896–97 by Frank Matcham, and again in 1976–78. The entrance block is stuccoed with a portico of Mansfield and Ancaster stone, and the latest additions are in concrete with tile cladding. The portico has five bays with six Corinthian columns, an entablature with a moulded architrave, a frieze with metal lettering, and a dentilled and bracketed cornice. The attic storey above has panelled pilasters with urns. Behind the portico are seven bays with round-arched doorways on the ground floor and round-arched French windows with balustraded balconies above.	II
Nottingham High School; 52.96260°N 1.15920°W		1866–67	The school, designed by Thomas Simpson, is in stone on a plinth, with string courses, buttresses with pinnacles, coped parapets, and slate roofs. It has one or two storeys and a basement, and a front of 13 bays, the middle three bays projecting. In the centre is a Y-plan stairway leading up to an arched doorway with traceried spandrels, over which is a niche and a pinnacle. This is flanked by canted bay windows, and most of the other windows are casements with stone mullions, tracery and hood moulds. Above and recessed is a single-stage square tower with an embattled parapet and an embattled corner turret.	II
Gateways and railings, Nottingham High School; 52.96213°N 1.15875°W		c. 1866	In the centre are two chamfered stone piers with arched panels and pyramidal caps, and between them are gates and railing with traceried tops. Outside, there are small iron gates with openwork iron piers, and spearhead railing on a stone plinth with chamfered coping, ending in smaller stone piers.	II
Nottingham Society for the Deaf; 52.96282°N 1.16299°W		1867	A school, later offices, designed by R. C. Sutton in Gothic Revival style, it is in red brick on a plinth, with dressings in stone and terracotta, string courses, impost bands and hood moulds, and a slate roof. There are two storeys and attics, and six bays, the right bay projecting and gabled. On the front is a gabled porch with a decorative pointed arch and hood mould, and a crest in the gable. Above it is a large three-light traceried window, above which is a traceried round window. The other windows are casements with pointed arched heads, and to the right is a small dormer.	II
St Andrew's United Reformed Church and former Sunday school 52.95686°N 1.15371°W		1869	The church and Sunday school were designed by Robert Evans in Gothic Revival style. They are in rock-faced stone with bands in lias limestone and slate roofs. The church is in a single unit, with semicircular transepts, two two-storey porches, one gabled, the other with a pyramidal roof, and stair towers at the west end. The Sunday school at the east end has two storeys and a basement.	II
Boundary wall, railings and gates, St Andrew's United Reformed Church; 52.95700°N 1.15382°W		1869	The boundary wall, railings and gates were designed by Robert Evans. The walls are in rock-faced sandstone with chamfered coping. The railings and gates are in cast iron, and the gateway on Chaucer Street has iron piers and an overthrow.	II
Former J B Spray and Company Lace Mill; 52.95964°N 1.16570°W		c. 1870	The lace mill, later converted for residential use, is in red brick on a plinth, with dressings in blue brick, moulded brick and stone, machicolated eaves, and slate roofs with coped gables. There are five storeys and attics and 13 bays. At each end on the Russell Street front is a canted stair turret with a gabled dormer and a canted hipped roof with a finial. Most of the windows are cast iron casements with segmental-arched polychrome heads.	II
Provident Works, office and walls 52.95878°N 1.16437°W		c. 1870	The lace mill, later converted for residential use, is in red brick on a plinth, with dressings in stone and brick, a sill band, a string course, a modillion cornice, a parapet and slate roofs. There are four storeys and fronts of 14 and three bays, the left two bays slightly recessed. Most of the windows are cast iron casements with wedge lintels. At the rear is a square chimney, and at the south corner is a projecting rounded office block with two storeys and one bay, containing sash windows. To the northwest is an extension with three storeys and fronts of six and eight bays. It has a plinth and bands in blue brick, a decorative eaves band and coped gables, and contains segmental-headed windows. Attached are walls with stone coping containing gateways.	II
St Mary's House, wall and railings 52.95956°N 1.16188°W		1870	The house, on a corner site, was designed by T. C. Hine for his son. It is in red brick with dressings in blue brick and stone and a hipped slate roof. There are two storeys and fronts of four and three bays. The doorway is tripartite with a round arch, shafts and a fanlight. Most of the windows are sashes, with brick segmental arches, some with deep sills on brackets, and some with imposts and keystones, and there is a triangular bay window. The area wall is in brick with a traceried cast iron railing and a gate.	II
Former Kirk's Factory, chimney and boilerhouse 52.95879°N 1.16374°W		1872	The lace factory, later used for other purposes, is in red brick on a plinth, with dressings in blue brick, moulded brick and stone, polychrome bands, elaborate dentilled eaves, and slate roofs. There are four storeys and attics, and fronts of 17 and ten bays. The rounded bay on the corner contains a doorway with a fanlight, voussoirs and a keystone, and at the top of the bay is a round-arched gable containing a clock. Most of the windows are iron casements with moulded brick segmental heads and keystones. In a yard is a boiler house with two storeys and three bays, and between it and the factory is an octagonal chimney stack with a recessed top, about 25 metres (82 ft) high.	II
Gate piers and screen plinths, Forest Recreation Ground; Forest Road East; 52.96317°N 1.16194°W		Late 19th century	The entrance to the ground is flanked by square stone piers with chamfered corners and decorative pyramidal caps. On each side, plinths with chamfered copings curve away and lead to similar end piers. On the right, a straight plinth extends for about 10 metres (33 ft) to end at a square pier with a cornice cap.	II
Gate piers and plinths at entrance to Waterloo Promenade, Forest Road West; 52.95960°N 1.16718°W		Late 19th century	The pair of square stone gate piers at the entrance to the promenade have chamfered corners, and decorative pyramidal caps, and they are surmounted by cast iron lamps. Flanking the piers is a short plinth with chamfered copings.	II
Gate piers and screen walls at entrance to Waterloo Promenade, Mount Hooton Road; 52.96325°N 1.16388°W		Late 19th century	The entrance to the promenade is flanked by chamfered square gate piers with moulded plinths. They have massive square caps with decorative segmental pediments, surmounted by the remains of cast iron lamps. On each side is a low stone screen wall with a railing, ending at a square pier with a moulded plinth and a concave-sided pyramidal cap.	II
Arkwright Building, Nottingham Trent University; 52.95758°N 1.15222°W		1877–81	The original University College building, designed by Lockwood and Mawson in Gothic Revival style. It is in stone and yellow brick, with a pierced balustrade, and Westmorland slate roofs with elaborate gables, spire turrets and iron crests. The main front has two storeys, attics and a basement, and nine bays, and the receding wings have five bays. In the ground floor are traceried windows, and in the upper floor the windows are arcaded. In the centre is an arched triple doorway under gables.	II*
Regent Court; 52.95530°N 1.15768°W		1879–83	A row of shops and warehouses, in red brick with dressings in blue brick, terracotta and stone, lintel bands, pilasters, a moulded cornice, a coped parapet, and slate mansard roofs. There are three storeys and attics, and a front of seven unequal bays. In the ground floor are shop fronts with pilasters and a fascia cornice on brackets. In the upper floors are sash windows, some with round-arched heads, and in the attic are gabled dormers.	II
Shiloh Gospel Hall; 52.96337°N 1.17015°W		1883	A Baptist church, later a gospel hall, in red brick with stone dressings and slate roofs. The main range has two storeys and six bays, and there are meeting rooms to the south and the east. On the corner is a square tower with three stages and a flat roof.	II
Former Poor Law offices, wall and railings 52.95803°N 1.15244°W		1886–87	The office block on a corner site was designed by A. H. Goodall. It is in red brick on a plinth, with stone dressings, pink granite columns, a sill band, a cornice, and Westmorland slate roofs. There are two storeys, a basement and attics, and fronts of seven and two bays. On the corner is a canted three-stage tower with a decorated cornice and parapet, and an octagonal spire roof. The windows are sashes with round and segmental heads, some with shafts, and there is a large oriel window with four window, brackets and a balcony. Steps lead up to the round-headed doorway that has a cornice and a fanlight, and at the rear is a square chimney in the form of a campanile. The basement area is enclosed by a coped wall with a wrought iron railing.	II
Aviary at The Arboretum; 52.96006°N 1.15730°W		1889	The aviary is a circular structure in cast and wrought iron with a wire netting cover. It has a central pier and arch braces with straight ribs forming a low-pitched roof. There is an outer ring of round posts linked at the top by an iron lintel.	II
Nottingham Women's Centre and Chaucer Court Workshops; 52.95726°N 1.15642°W		c. 1890	Workshops that were later partly used for other purposes, in red brick, the basement in stone, with dressings in stone and terracotta, and slate roofs with coped gables. There are two storeys, basement and attics, and eleven bays. The left bay is a three-stage tower, with a porch containing a round-arched entrance, over which is a canted oriel window, two round-headed windows, and a pyramidal roof. The eighth bay projects slightly under a gable, and contains a doorway with a fanlight, side lights and a pediment. Between these bays are segmental-headed windows in the basement, and above are mullioned and transomed casements. In the right bay is a round-arched carriage entrance with voussoirs, and in the attics are gabled dormers.	II
St Stephen's Church; 52.96884°N 1.17521°W		1897–98	The church, designed by W. D. Caröe, is in red brick with dressings in Bath stone, and tile roofs. It consists of a nave with a clerestory, north and south aisles, west and south porches, a chancel and a choir vestry On the junction of the nave and chancel is a lantern surmounted by a spirelet, and at the west end is a bellcote. The west porch is gabled and contains an arched doorway, above which is a large six-light window in an arched recess, divided by a canted stair turret.	II
106 to 124 Derby Road; 52.95582°N 1.16033°W		1898	A row of shops and warehouses in brick, with stone dressings, polychrome bands, moulded floor bands, a moulded cornice and frieze, and slate roofs with coped gables and finials. There are three storeys and attics, and ten bays, stepped down a hill. In the ground floor are shop fronts divided by pilasters, with fascias on gabled brackets. In the upper floors are sash windows, those in the attics with elliptical-arched polychrome heads, and in the lower floors with decorative lintels.	II
70 to 82 Derby Road; 52.95555°N 1.15864°W		1899	A row of shops, houses and warehouses in brick, with stone dressings, sill bands, a moulded eaves cornice and slate roofs. There are three storeys and attics, and eight bays. In the ground floor are shop fronts divided by pilasters, under a fascia cornice. In the upper floors are sash windows, those in the middle floor with segmental-arched heads, rusticated surrounds and keystones. The top floor windows have flat heads and double keystones, and in the attic are four shaped gables containing Diocletian windows with double keystones and voussoirs, and three box dormers with segmental pediments.	II
Boulevard United Reformed Church, steps and wall 52.96546°N 1.17124°W		1900	The church is in stone with terracotta ornament and tile roofs. It consists of a nave with a clerestory and aisles, a chancel, and a northwest steeple. The steeple has a tower has two stages, angle buttresses rising to round pinnacles, a terracotta band, a shaped parapet, and a recessed octagonal slate spire. The front facing the road has three bays, the middle bay wider and gabled, and steps lead up to a doorway with a pointed arch in each outer bay. The boundary wall is in rock-faced stone with slab coping, a railing and square piers.	II
Boer War Memorial; 52.96337°N 1.16209°W		1903	The war memorial in the Forest Recreation Ground commemorates the Boer War. It consists of a square obelisk in pink granite, about 3 metres (9.8 ft) high, on an inscribed pedestal on a plinth. This stands on a stone stepped square base, with domed corner pedestals.	II
Bandstand at The Arboretum; 52.96117°N 1.15827°W		1907	The bandstand has an octagonal plan, a brick base, a wooden superstructure, and a hipped slate roof with a finial. It is glazed with sashes, it has a wooden guard rail, and steps on one side.	II
Bright Family memorial, Nottingham General Cemetery; 52.95680°N 1.15914°W		c. 1908	The memorial is to members of the Bright family who died between 1871 and 1928. It is in white faience, and has a decorated octagonal shaft surmounted by a tabernacle, on a hexagonal pedestal and a plinth. The pedestal has unequal sides, containing plaques and memorial tablets, and the base is square with octagonal corner pedestals.	II
Westminster Buildings; 52.95505°N 1.15224°W		1909	A block of offices, shops and a public house, designed by A. H. Goodall in Baroque Revival style, on a tapering peninsular site. It is in red brick with stone dressings and slate roofs. There are four storeys and attics, three bays on the end, and seven on the sides. On the end are rusticated pilasters and it contains a central recessed entrance, above which is a three-storey canted bay window, and in the attic is a dormer with a segmental broken pediment flanked by box dormers. In the ground floor are shop fronts and above, in alternating bays, are three-storey canted bay windows. Most of the windows are sashes, and in the first floor they have open pediments.	II
Memorial to Samuel Morley; 52.95969°N 1.15720°W		1920	The memorial near the southwest entrance to The Arboretum commemorates Samuel Morley. It is by Joseph Else, and consists of a bronze bust on a tapered square stone pedestal, in front of a larger pedestal with stepped top. This is flanked by a curved screen wall with stone seats, and ends in a square pedestal.	II
War memorial and kerb, Church Cemetery; 52.96485°N 1.15379°W		c. 1920	The war memorial is in the standard design by Sir Reginald Blomfield. It consists of a tapering octagonal cross in Portland stone, on an octagonal pedestal and base on a rock-faced plinth. On the front is a bronze sword. The memorial is in a triangular area plot with a rounded corner, surrounded by a rock-faced kerb with flat coping.	II
War memorial and headstones, Nottingham General Cemetery; 52.95887°N 1.15700°W		c. 1920	The war memorial is in the standard design by Sir Reginald Blomfield. It consists of a tapering octagonal cross in Portland stone, on an octagonal pedestal and base, and on the front is a bronze sword. The memorial is in a triangular area paved in York stone, enclosed by a retaining wall. At the rear is a curved wall in Portland stone on a plinth, and with an inscribed cornice. On the walls are panels with the names of those lost in the war, and in the corner of the area are three military headstones.	II
War memorial, Nottingham High School; 52.96223°N 1.15887°W		1922	The memorial consists of a life-size bronze statue of an officer in battle dress on a square pedestal in Portland stone, with a cornice and a moulded base. On the pedestal is a scrolled crest, an inscription, and bronze plaques, and there is a base of three steps. This stands on a semicircular platform with central stone steps and is surrounded by rock-faced retaining walls with chamfered coping.	II
Newton Building, Nottingham Trent University; 52.95627°N 1.15189°W		1956–58	The building is faced in Portland stone. The entrance block has a projecting centre with pilasters in antis flanked by vertical windows, and in the outer ranges are five-light windows. Recessed behind this is an eight-storey slab, with a vertical moulded window at the end. Along each side is a panel of vertical strip windows with projecting masonry pilasters, flanked on each side by panels with narrow horizontal windows.	II*
