= Henry Harper (architect) =

English architect (1846–1919)

Henry Harper (1846–1919) was an architect based in Nottingham who is noted for the large number of churches and chapels built for Primitive Methodists.

== Life ==
He was born on 9 October 1846 in Calverley, Yorkshire, the son of Thomas Harper (1819–1856) and his wife Elizabeth (1821–1896). He was baptised on 18 July 1847 in St Wilfrid's Church, Calverley.

He married Mary Ann Marshall (1845–1905), fifth daughter of Samuel Marshall of Rawden on 12 October 1868 in the Primitive Methodist Chapel, Rawdon, Yorkshire and they had the following children:

- Thomas Harper (1869–1897)
- Harry Marshall Harper (1872–1943)
- Ellen Harper (1874–1951)
- Wilfred Harper (born 1878)
- Fanny Harper (1880–1883)

In 1871 he is recorded as living at 23 Beech Street, Cheetham, Manchester, and his occupation was joiner and local preacher. In 1881 he was living at 20 Norton Street, Nottingham. By 1895 he is established as an architect in Nottingham, based in Tavistock Chambers, Nottingham.

After the death of his wife on 29 July 1905, he married Sarah Ann Doar (1842–1930) on 30 April 1907 at St Giles' Church, Sandiacre.

He died on 30 April 1919 at 71 Cromwell Street, Nottingham and after a funeral service at Forest Road Primitive Methodist Church was buried on 3 May 1919 in Nottingham General Cemetery.

== Works ==
- Primitive Methodist Church, Arnold, Nottingham 1886–87 (enlargement)
- Bulwell Public Hall, Nottinghamshire 1894
- Primitive Methodist Chapel, Sutton-in-Ashfield 1895
- Primitive Methodist Chapel, Youlgreave, Derbyshire 1895
- Primitive Methodist Chapel, Overseal, Derbyshire 1895
- Primitive Methodist Church, Nottingham Road, Mansfield 1896
- Primitive Methodist Chapel, Watnall Road/Beardall Street, Hucknall Torkard 1896
- Primitive Methodist Chapel and School, Royton, Lancashire 1897
- Primitive Methodist Chapel, Hognaston, Derbyshire 1898–99
- Primitive Methodist Chapel, Roman Bank, Skegness 1898
- Primitive Methodist Chapel, Ellesmere Port 1899–1900
- Primitive Methodist Chapel, Nottingham Road, Stapleford 1899
- Primitive Methodist Church, Mattison Road, Harringay 1901
- Wesleyan Methodist Schools, Welbeck Street, Sutton in Ashfield 1904
- Primitive Methodist Chapel, Manchester Road, Cubitt Town 1904–05 (demolished 1978)
- Congregational Church, London Road, Newark, Nottinghamshire 1907
- Primitive Methodist Church, Holliers Hill, Sidley, Sussex 1907
- Primitive Methodist Church, Duke Street, Middleton-by-Wirksworth, Derbyshire 1906–07
- Primitive Methodist Schools, Stanton Hill 1908
- Primitive Methodist Chapel, Talke Pitts, Staffordshire 1908
- Schools for Primitive Methodist Church, Grange Road, Birkenhead 1907
- Primitive Methodist Church, Gainsborough 1910
- Primitive Methodist Church and Institute, Newbold-on-Stour, Worcestershire 1910
- Primitive Methodist Church, Clyde Street/Avon Street, Motherwell, Scotland 1912
- Primitive Methodist Church, High Street, Erdington, Birmingham 1912
- Primitive Methodist Chapel, Shepshed, Leicestershire 1913
- Primitive Methodist Church, Highley, Worcestershire 1913–14
- Beaconthorpe Methodist Church, Grimsby Road, Cleethorpes 1914 (destroyed by fire)
- Primitive Methodist Connexion church, Vron, Wales 1917

== Gallery ==
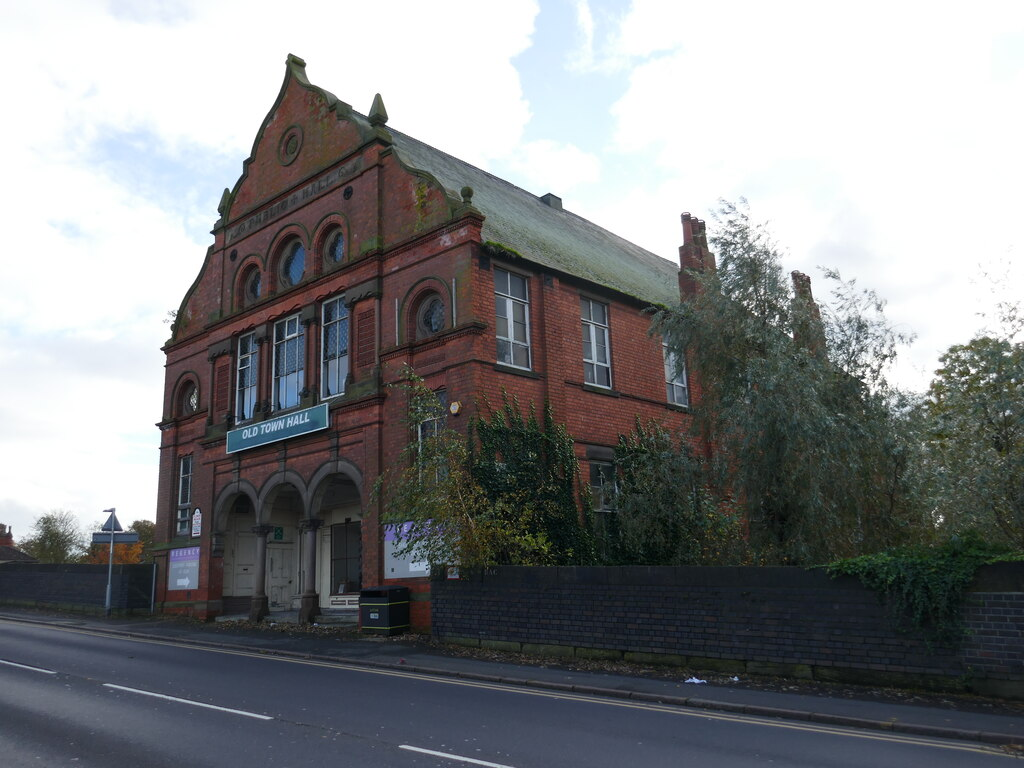
Bulwell Public Hall 1894

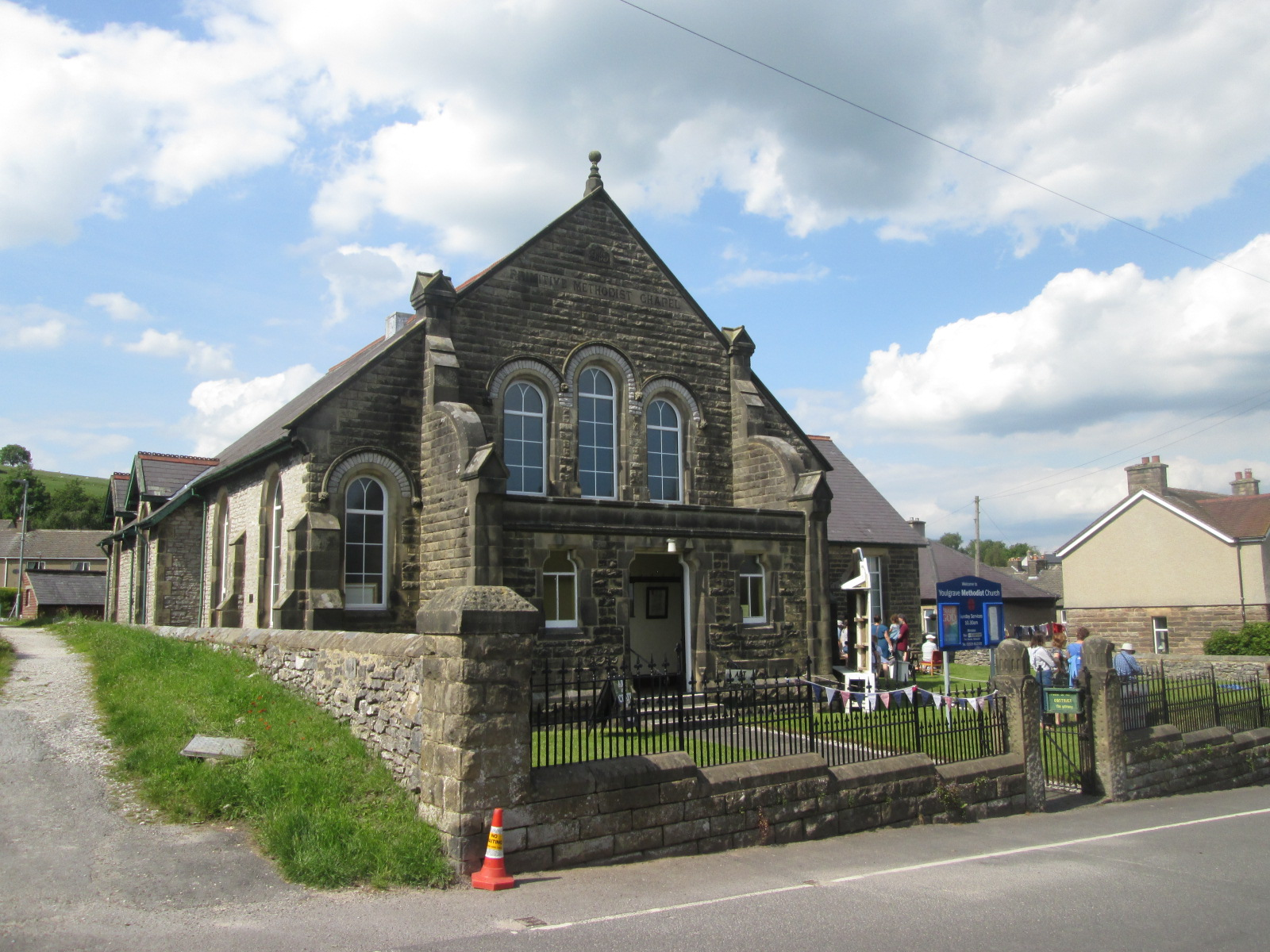
Primitive Methodist Church, Youlgreve 1895

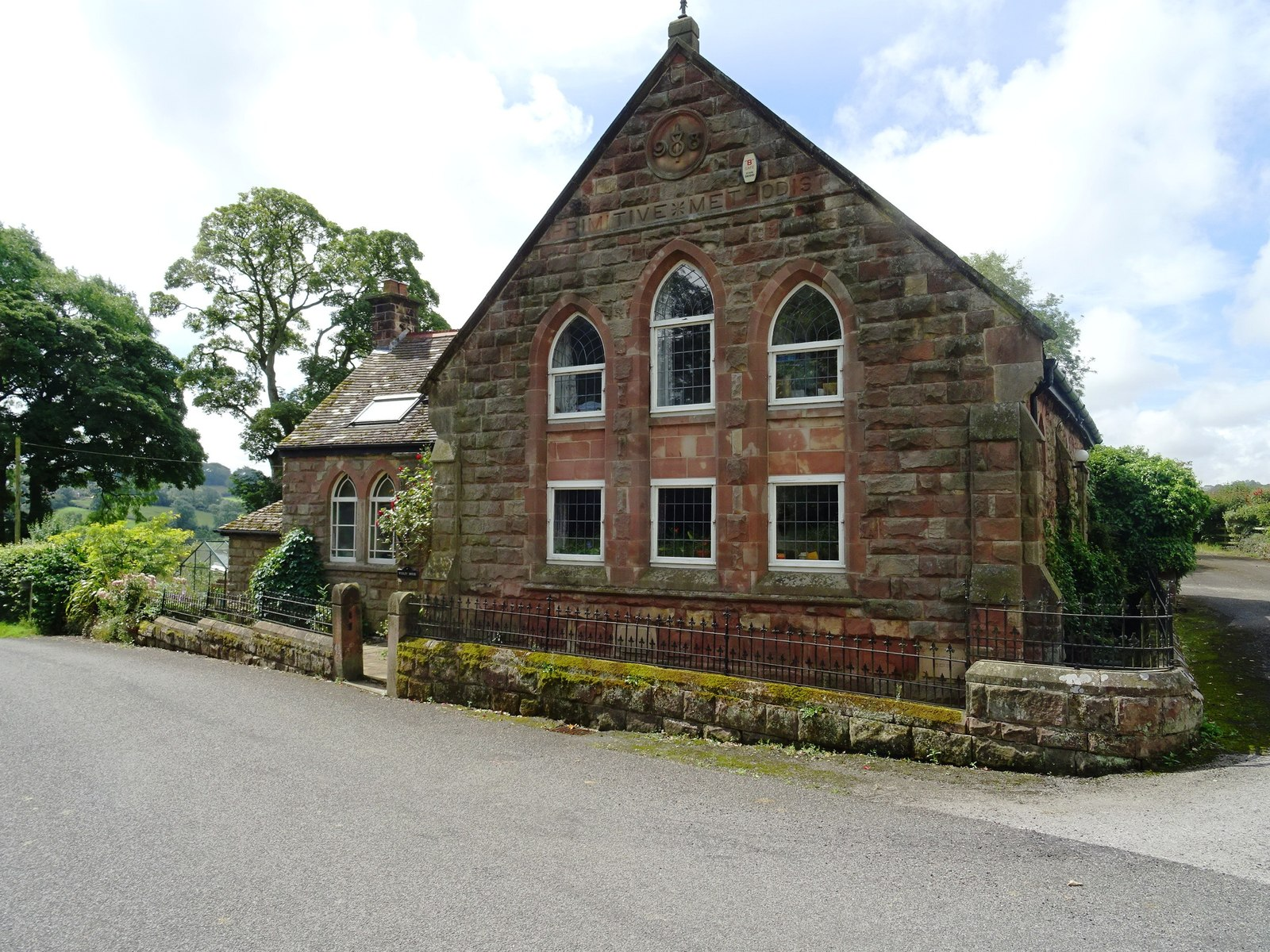
Primitive Methodist Church, Hognaston 1898

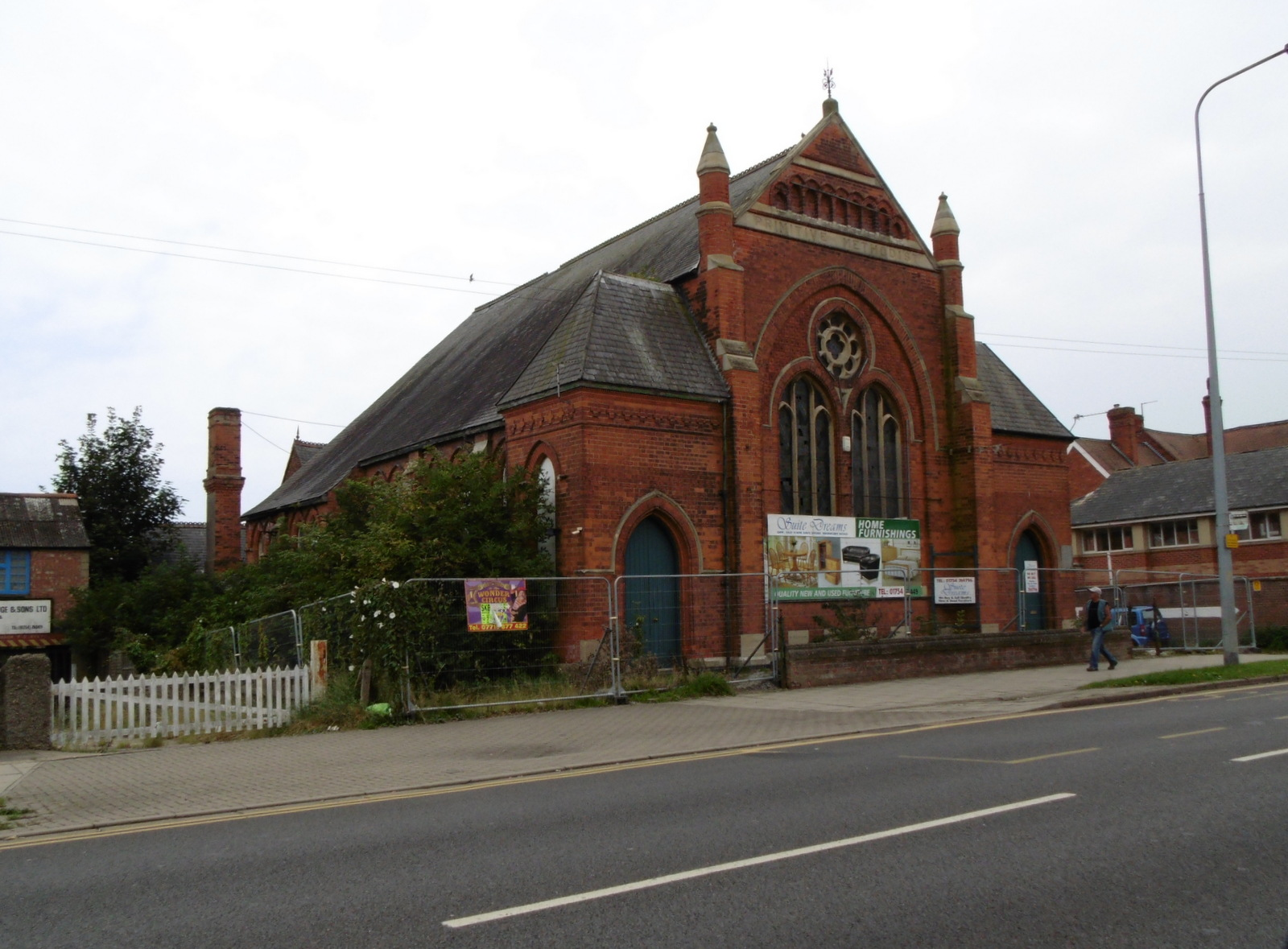
Primitive Methodist Church, Roman Bank, Skegness 1898

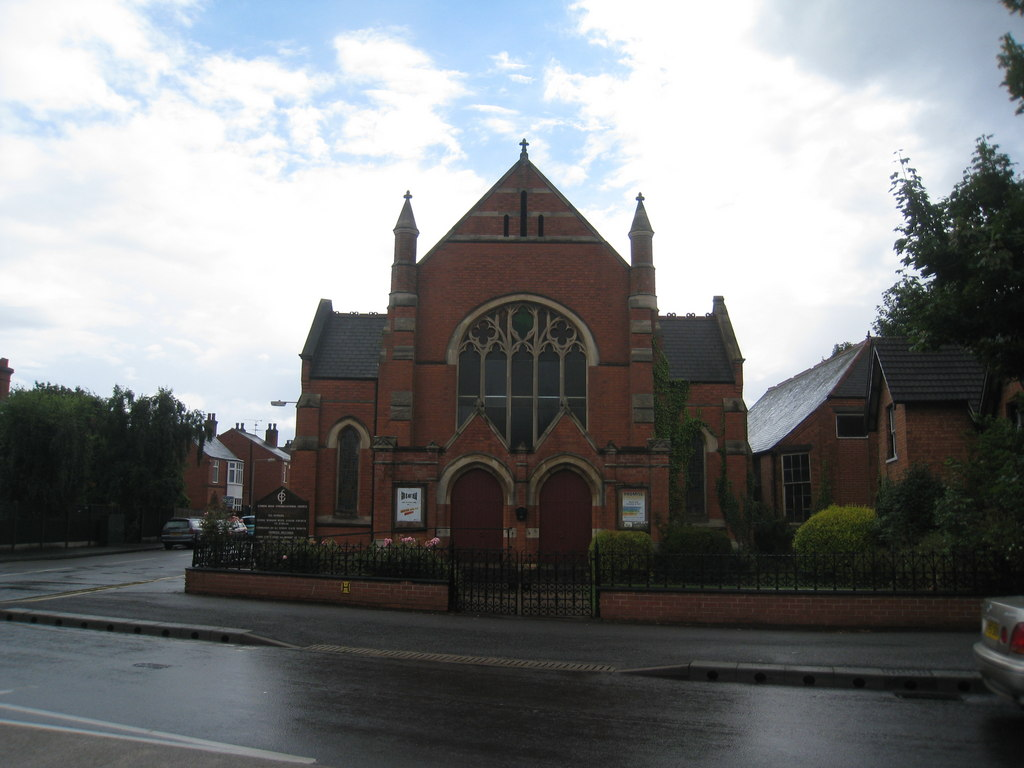
Congregational church, London Road, Newark 1907

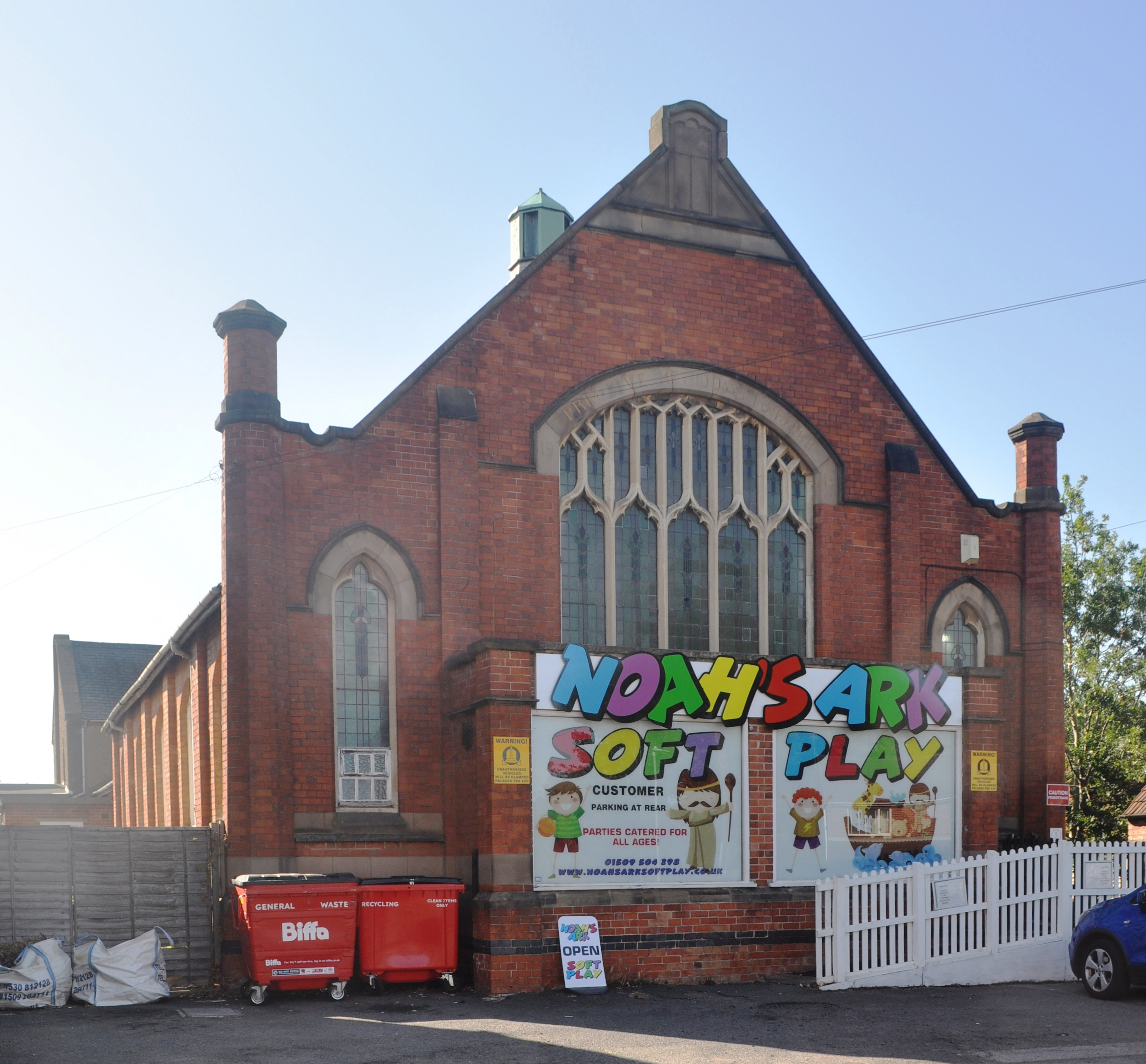
Primitive Methodist Chapel, Shepshed 1913

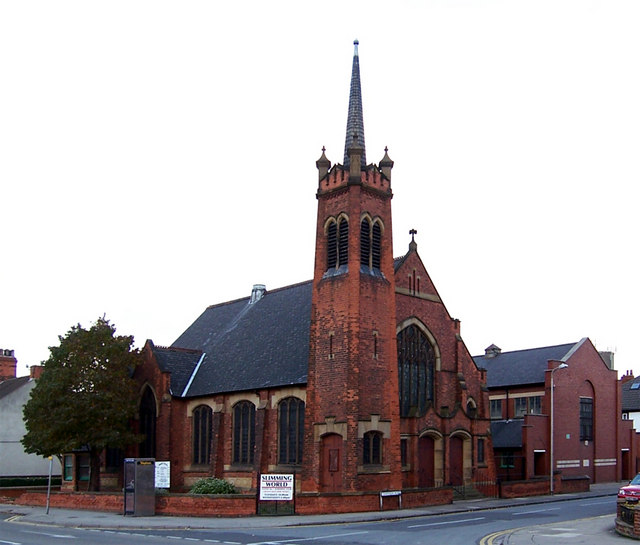
Beaconthorpe Methodist Church, Cleethorpes 1914

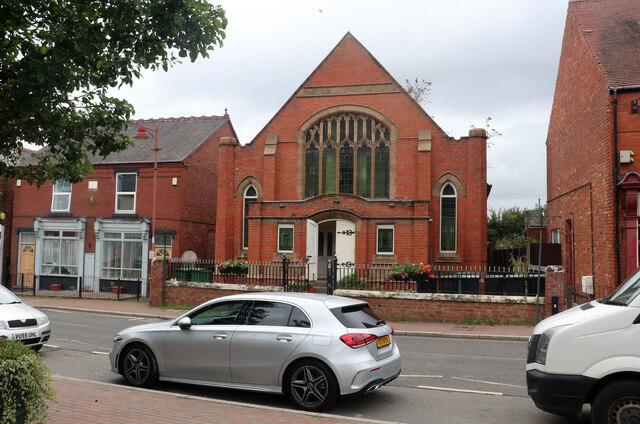
Primitive Methodist Chapel, Highley 1914
