= Bell Taylor =

English ophthalmic surgeon (1829–1909)

- Born: 2 September 1829; Nottingham
- Died: 14 April 1909 (aged 79); Beechwood Hall
- Occupations: Surgeon, writer

Charles Bell Taylor (2 September 1829 – 14 April 1909) was an English ophthalmic surgeon, known also as a campaigner against the Contagious Diseases Act and vivisection.

== Early life ==
Born in Nottingham on 2 September 1829, he was son of Charles Taylor by his wife Elizabeth Ann Galloway; his father and brother were veterinary surgeons in the town. After brief employment in the lace warehouse of his uncle, William Galloway, he apprenticed himself to Thomas Godfrey, a surgeon at Mansfield.

== Medical career ==
Taylor was admitted member of the Royal College of Surgeons of England in 1852, and a licentiate of the Society of Apothecaries in 1855. He graduated M.D. at the University of Edinburgh in 1854, and in 1867 he obtained the diploma of fellow of the Royal College of Surgeons of Edinburgh. In 1854 Taylor was pursuing medical studies in Paris. He acted for some time as medical superintendent at the Walton Lodge Asylum, Liverpool, then in 1859 returned to Nottingham, where he lived for the rest of his life. In that year he joined the staff of the newly established Nottingham and Midland Eye Infirmary.

Especially in cases of cataract, Taylor gained a high reputation as a surgeon, and an international practice. He always operated by artificial light, would not use chloroform, and never employed a qualified assistant. His patients included Mary Gove Nichols, to whom he restored full sight in 1868.

== Opponent of the Contagious Diseases Act (1869) ==
Taylor took a prominent, and professionally unpopular, part in securing the repeal of the Contagious Diseases Act. He was recruited to the campaign against the Act by a newspaper article written by Robert Eli Hooppell. Around this time he agreed to lead opposition to the Act, in correspondence with Daniel Cooper of the Society for the Rescue of Young Women and Children; and found an ally in Charles Worth, another Nottingham surgeon. He offered the 1869 Social Science Congress in Bristol a paper against the Act, and was turned down. He then organised a fringe meeting on the opening day of the Congress, attended by 70.

== Views ==
Taylor was also a determined opponent of vivisection and compulsory vaccination. He held strong views on diet, was an abstainer from alcohol, tobacco, tea and coffee, and took only two meals a day. He was also an uncompromising individualist.

== Death and will ==
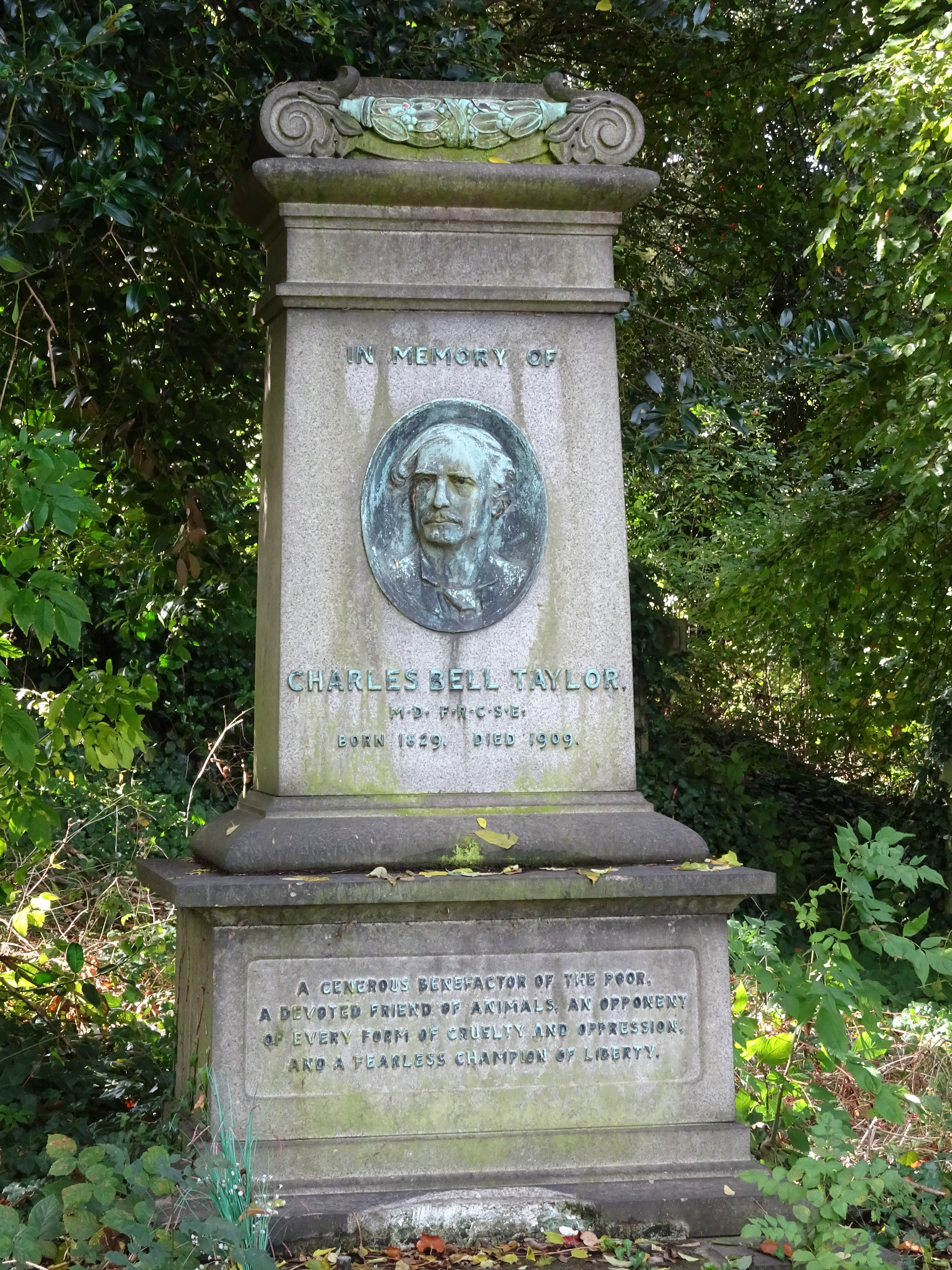
Memorial to Charles Bell Taylor (ophthalmic surgeon)

Taylor died, unmarried, at Beechwood Hall, near Nottingham, on 14 April 1909, and was buried at the Nottingham General Cemetery. Most of his estate of £160,000 was distributed by his will among the British Union for the Abolition of Vivisection; the London Anti-Vivisection Society; the British committee of the International Federation for the Abolition of the State Regulation of Vice; the National Anti-Vaccination League; and the Royal Society for the Prevention of Cruelty to Animals.

== Selected publications ==
- Lectures of the Diseases of the Eye (1888)
- Vivisection, is it Justifiable? (1892)

== Notes ==
Attribution This article incorporates text from a publication now in the public domain: Lee, Sidney, ed. (1912). "Taylor, Charles Bell". Dictionary of National Biography (2nd supplement). Vol. 3. London: Smith, Elder & Co.
