= Edwin Patchitt =

English cricketer

Edwin Patchitt (JP) Justice of the peace (1808 – 6 February 1888) was a lawyer, Mayor of Nottingham (1852), and a first-class cricketer active 1840–45 who played for Nottinghamshire. He was born in Nottingham and died in Hastings.

== Biography ==
He was educated at Nottingham Bluecoat School and on leaving entered into the office of Messrs. William and Thomas Sculthorpe solicitors, St Peter’s Gate, Nottingham. In due course he became a qualified solicitor practising on his own account. He was also a justice of the peace for Nottingham, during which time he read the Riot Act when Nottingham Castle was set on fire during the protests over the Reform Act 1832.

In 1840 he was elected clerk to the Court of Requests, a tribunal for the recovery of debts which succeeded the Ancient Peveril Court holding jurisdiction in Nottingham. In 1846, the Court of Requests was abolished, and he was appointed registrar of the Nottingham, Mansfield and Bingham County Courts. In 1847 he succeeded William Sculthorpe as clerk to the Nottingham magistrates.

From 1840 to 1845 he represented Nottinghamshire in the cricket field, which included matches at home and also Brighton, the Oval and at Lord’s. He played in four first-class matches.

In 1852 he was elected councillor for the St Mary’s Ward of the Town Council, and in 1858 was elected Mayor of Nottingham.

He also was registrar of Nottingham County Court for over forty years, and one of the founders of the Robin Hood Regiment of Volunteers.

In 1837 he married Eliza Speed. He died at the Queen's Hotel in Hastings on 6 February 1888 and on 11 February 1888 he was buried in Church Cemetery, Nottingham which he had designed and managed the construction.
