= St Andrew's with Castle Gate United Reformed Church =

St Andrew's with Castlegate United Reformed Church
- St Andrew's with Castlegate United Reformed Church in June 2025
- St Andrew's with Castlegate United Reformed Church
- 52°57′24″N 1°09′14″W
- Denomination: United Reformed
- Website: standrewswithcastlegate.org.uk

Architecture
- Heritage designation: Grade II listed
- Architect: Robert Evans JP
- Style: Early decorated Gothic
- Groundbreaking: 21 September 1869
- Completed: 29 September 1870
- Construction cost: £4,000 (equivalent to £411,656 in 2025).

Specifications
- Capacity: 600 people

St Andrew's with Castle Gate United Reformed Church is in Nottingham.

== Formation ==
St Andrew's with Castle Gate United Reformed Church, Nottingham, was established in 1975 by the union of St Andrew's URC with Castle Gate URC, following the creation of the United Reformed Church by Act of Parliament in 1972. Prior to this date, St Andrew's (founded 1870) had been the leading Presbyterian Church in the city and Castle Gate (founded c.1665) the leading Congregational Church.

== Buildings ==
Following Union, the membership of St Andrew's-with-Castle Gate resolved to retain the former St Andrew's premises on Goldsmith Street, where it still worships and hosts its many other activities, while the Castle Gate premises were acquired by the Congregational Federation (bringing together those Congregational Churches that elected to remain independent on the formation of the URC), for use as its national headquarters. It is now known as The Castle Gate Centre.

== History ==
The Church has a long and distinguished history of Christian witness in the city and county through its different branches. The history of Castle Gate Congregational Church can be traced to the mid-seventeenth century and the period of the English Civil War. A dissenting community of Independents (Congregationalists) first set up a Church in Castle Gate in 1689, while the existing building was opened in 1864. The St Andrew's Presbyterian Church was constituted in 1866 and its present building was opened in 1870.

Both Churches assisted in the foundation of daughter churches in the locality in the nineteenth and twentieth centuries. Castle Gate's included The Boulevard (Gregory Boulevard, 1823), Albion (Sneinton, 1856), Addison Street (1867), Queen's Walk (1874), Park Hill (Derby Road, 1880), Bloomsgrove (Norton Street, 1894), with missions at Thorneywood (1861) and Old Radford (1860-61). Most of these (The Boulevard being a distinguished exception) have now closed or have merged again with their mother churches. St Andrew's, in its turn, established the Hyson Green Mission (Noel Street) in 1885, where a new Church was opened in 1901, to survive until the close of WW2. In 1896, St Columba's was opened on the Mansfield Road, to re-unite with St Andrew's in 1946. The St Ann's Well Road Congregational Church, an independent foundation, united with Castle Gate Congregational Church in 1971, shortly before the majority of Congregational Churches in England and Wales united with the English Presbyterian Church to form the United Reformed Church. In October 2022 the church members voted in favour of offering same sex marriage, and shortly thereafter published statements online confirming their commitment to LGBTQ+ inclusion.

== Archives ==
The archives of St Andrew's with Castle Gate URC, its precursors, and a number of their daughter churches are now located at The Department of Manuscripts and Special Collections at The University of Nottingham (King's Meadow Campus, Lenton Lane, Nottingham NG7 2NR), where it is accessible to all.

== Ministers ==
The Castle Gate Congregational Church and the St Ann's Well Road Congregational Church (the latter in italics)

- Revd. Thomas Palmer (1643-c 1660 [conjectural])
- Revd. John James (c 1669-c 1678)
- Revd. John Gibbs (1678–82)
- Revd. John Ryther (1686-1704)
- Revd. Richard Bateson (1705-1739)
- Revd. John Farmer (assistant minister 1730)
- Revd. ? Floyd (assistant minister 1730-1731)
- Revd. James Sloss (joint minister 1733-39; minister 1739-72)
- Revd. Gervas Wylde (assistant minister 1741-48)
- Revd. Thomas Bingham (assistant minister 1748-53)
- Revd. John Troughton Alliston (co-minister 1760-71)
- Revd. James Popplewell (assistant minister 1764-67)
- Revd. Richard Plumbe (1772–91)
- Revd. Richard Alliott Snr (1794-1840)
- Revd. Richard Alliott Jnr (assistant minister, 1828, co-minister, 1829–40, minister, 1840–43)
- Revd. Samuel McAll (1843–59)
- Revd. Clement Clamance (1860–75)
- Revd. Robert Nobbs (assistant minister, 1870–72)
- Revd. Robert Dawson (1870-81)
- Revd. John Bartlett (1875–83)
- Revd. James Bruce (1881-83)
- Revd. Walter J.S. Davis (1883-88)
- Revd. Baldwin Brindley (1884-1901)
- Revd. C.N. Barham (1889-94)
- Revd. John D. Allen (1896-1904)
- Revd. A.R. Henderson (1902–19)
- Revd. Heber Rosier (1905-12)
- Revd. John Frankland (1912-20)
- Revd. William H. Tame (1920-22)
- Revd. E.J. Hawkins (1920–30)
- Revd. Stanley B. Green (1923-28)
- Revd. Ronald K. Ross (1929-1971)
- Revd. G. Hartley Holloway (1931–37)
- Revd. J.E. James (1941–43)
- Revd. R. Angel Wakeley (1944–50)
- Revd. Ronald Ward (1953–59)
- Revd. Robert Duce (1961–70)
- Revd. Brian Nuttall (1971–75)
- Revd. Ronald K. Ross (Minister Emeritus, 1971–75)

The St Andrew's Presbyterian Church and the St Columba's Presbyterian Church (the latter in italics)

- Revd. James Brown Dougherty (1868–79)
- Revd. Robert Cowan (1880–94)
- Revd. John Charles Grant (1894-1932)
- Revd. Dr John Forbes (1897-1930)
- Revd. Gilbert Porteous,(1930-39)
- Revd. George Walker (1936–64)
- Revd. James Robson (1939-40)
- Revd. C. C. E. Mercer (locum minister during WW2)
- Revd. Allan Porter (locum minister during WW2)
- Revd. Alun Lloyd Davies (1964–75)

St Andrew's-with-Castle Gate United Reformed Church

- Revd. Hamish Baillie (1975-1990)
- Revd. Ronald K. Ross (Minister Emeritus 1975-80)
- Revd. Adrian Thomas (associate minister, 1977–85)
- Revd. Norman Healey (associate minister, 1985–92)
- Revd. Clifford Wilton (1992-2007)
- Revd. Christopher Ford (associate minister, 1998-2008)
- Revd. Ian Wiseman (2008-2015)
- Revd. Kara Cooper (associate minister, 2011-2014)
- Revd. Christopher Ford (2017-)

== Organ ==
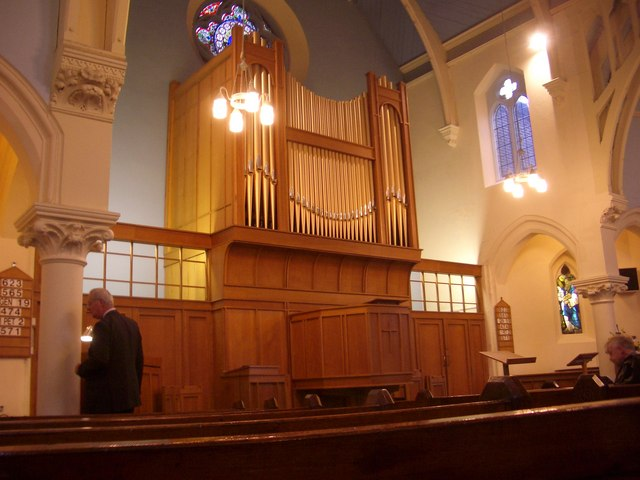
The organ

The organ was rebuilt in 1936 by J.W. Walker and modernised in 1982. A specification of the organ can be found on the National Pipe Organ Register.

== See also ==
- Listed buildings in Nottingham (Hyson Green and Arboretum ward)
