= Canning Terrace =

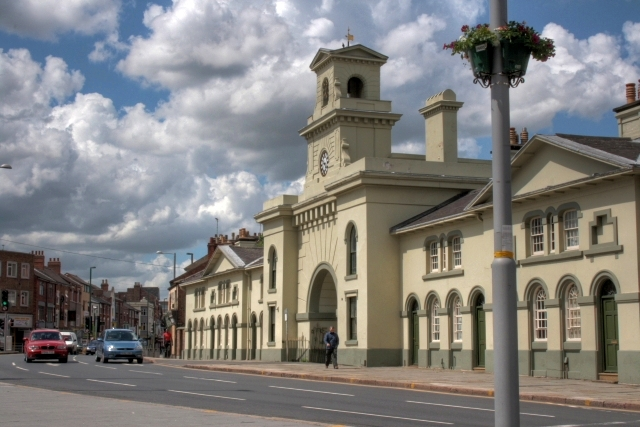

- Location within Nottinghamshire
- 52°57′22.72″N 1°9′43.93″W
- Location: Nottingham, Nottinghamshire, England

History
- Built: 1837-1840

Site notes
- Architect: Samuel Sutton Rawlinson
- Restored: 1985

Listed Building – Grade II

Canning Terrace was erected in 1837-1840 on Zion Hill at Canning Circus, Nottingham.

== History ==
It was built as a series of almshouses flanking the cemetery gatehouse, by the architect Samuel Sutton Rawlinson. It was named after George Canning, Prime Minister in 1827.

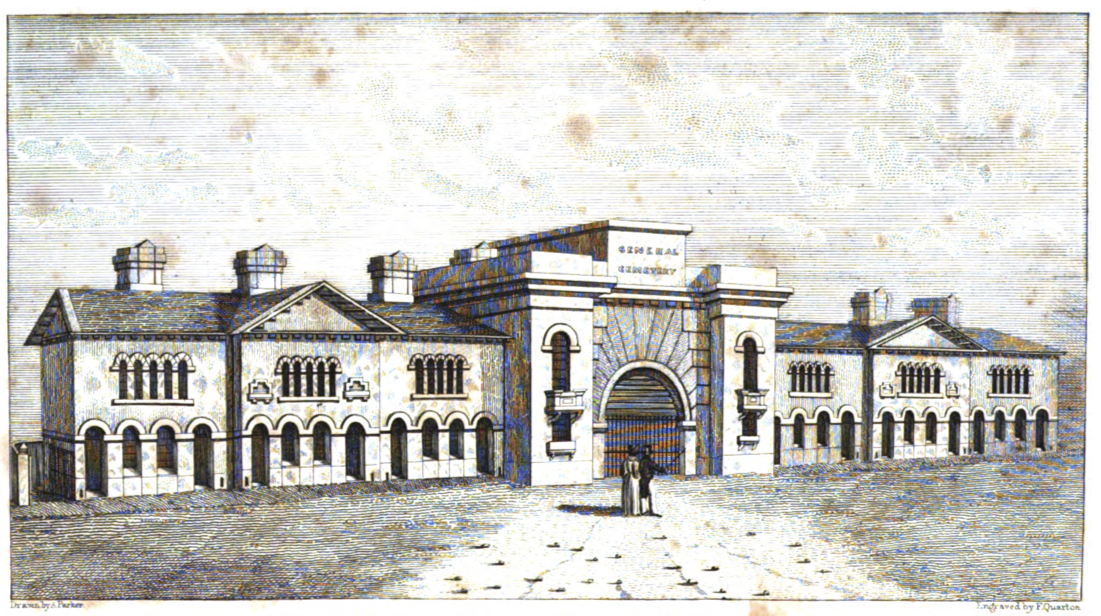
Canning Terrace from the History and Antiquities of Nottingham by James Orange, 1840
