= Church Cemetery, Nottingham =

Cemetery in Nottingham, England

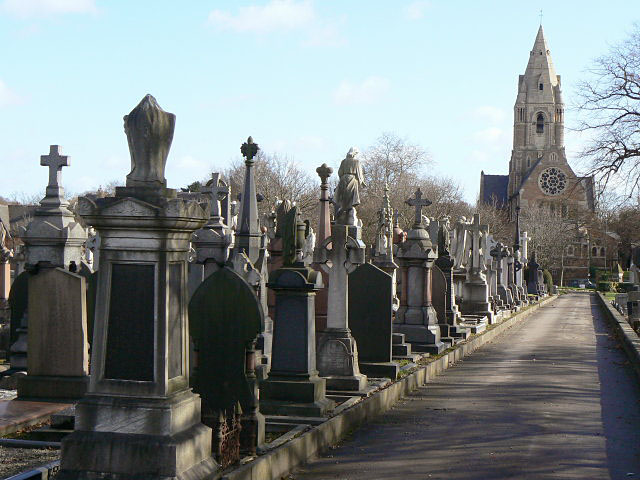
- Church Cemetery, towards St Andrew's Church
- Interactive map of Church Cemetery, Nottingham

Details
- Established: 1848
- Location: Nottingham
- Country: England
- Coordinates: 52°57′53″N 1°9′17″W
- Owned by: Nottingham City Council
- Size: 13 acres (5.3 ha)

Church Cemetery, also known as Rock Cemetery, is a place of burial in Nottingham, England which is Grade II* listed. It is situated at the south-east corner of Forest Recreation Ground.

== History ==
Church Cemetery was founded in 1848 and was designed by Edwin Patchitt, clerk to the County Magistrates. Fundraising started in 1851 and 181 shareholders represented a contribution of 959 £5 shares. The tenancies for the land were arranged in 1853 and it was not finished when it opened in 1856. A church was included in the design, which gave the cemetery its name, but this was not built at the time of its opening. The construction works involved the removal and relocation of some 20,000 tons of earth and the laying out of paths and suitable planting including Cedars of Lebanon.

It was consecrated by the Bishop of Lincoln, Right Revd John Jackson on 18 June 1856

A mortuary chapel to the designs of the architect Edward William Godwin opened on 14 August 1879. The fittings were of varnished pitch pine, with accommodation for about 120 people. A bell turret surmounted the chapel, and in the archway through which mourning coaches passed, there was a waiting room. The cost of the chapel was £2,600 (equivalent to £279,300 in 2025), and the contractors were Messrs. Bradley and Barker. It was demolished in 1965

A war memorial designed by Sir Reginald Blomfield was added in 1920 and is Grade II listed. The cemetery contains the scattered war graves of 81 Commonwealth service personnel of World War I and 20 of World War II.

Nottingham City Council took over responsibility in 1965.

=== Notable interments ===
- Thomas Adams (manufacturer and philanthropist) 1873
- Marriott Ogle Tarbotton engineer 1887
- Edwin Patchitt 1888
- Anthony John Mundella MP 1897
- Philip James Bailey poet 1902
- Hedley John Price architect 1905
- Samuel Waite Johnson railway engineer 1912
- William Arthur Heazell architect 1917
- Arthur Clamp footballer 1918 - one of the war graves in the cemetery.,
- Watson Fothergill architect 1928

== See also ==
- Listed buildings in Nottingham (Hyson Green and Arboretum ward)
