= Broadway Cinema =

Cinema in Nottingham, England

Coordinates: 52°57′15.4″N 1°8′37.8″W

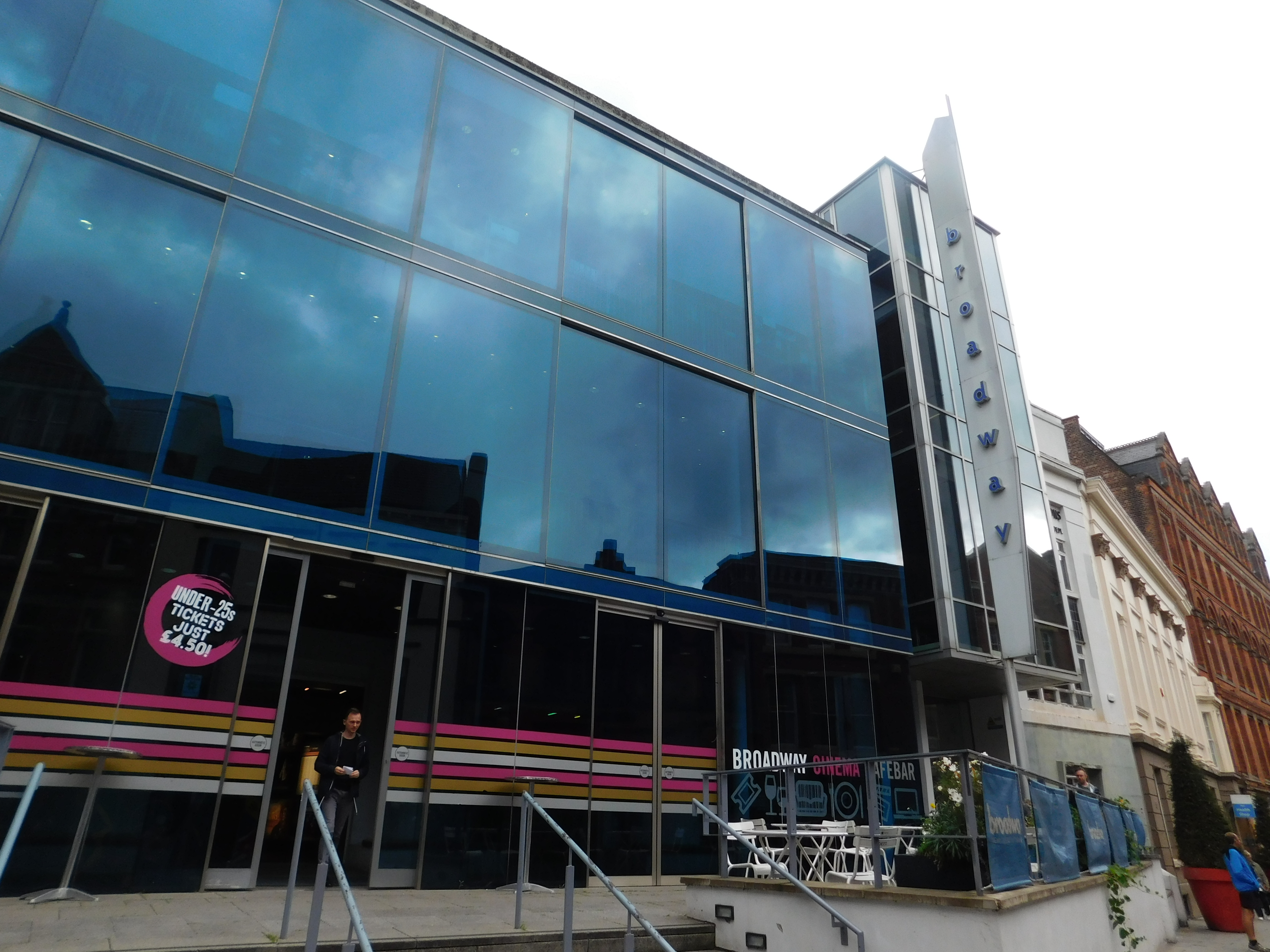
- The front of the cinema
- Interactive map of the Broadway Cinema area

General information
- Status: Operating
- Type: Cinema
- Location: 14-18 Broad Street, Nottingham, England
- Current tenants: Broadway Cinema
- Construction started: 1839
- Opened: 1990
- Renovated: 2006;2019
- Owner: Broadway Cinema Ltd

Design and construction
- Architect: S. S. Rawlinson

Website
- www.broadway.org.uk

Broadway Cinema is an independent cinema and registered charity (charity number 700880) in Nottingham, England, located in the Hockley area of the city's Creative Quarter. With a mission to inspire creativity and a lifelong love of film, Broadway is one of the UK's leading independent cinemas, attracting circa 200,000 visitors annually to its four-screen cinema, café bar, and creative workspace. The cinema screens independent British and world cinema alongside Hollywood releases and classic film retrospectives. In 2009, it was rated as one of the best cinemas in the world by Total Film magazine.

Broadway Cinema is the lead organisation for Film Hub Midlands, in partnership with Flatpack Projects, as part of the BFI Film Audience Network. Film Hub Midlands provides funding and training to help people across the Midlands region watch, make and show films.

Broadway Cinema is also the home of Near Now, an arts and technology programme that has been funded by Arts Council England as a National Portfolio Organisation since 2014. Near Now works with artists and companies to explore the role of technology in everyday life.

== Programming and Festivals ==
Broadway Cinema hosts a diverse range of film seasons, festivals, and special events. Each October, the cinema hosts Mayhem Film Festival, the region's only weekend horror film festival, which attracts audiences from across the UK and welcomes filmmakers from around the world. Through the 1990s and into the 2000s, Broadway ran Shots in the Dark, the UK's only crime and thriller film festival, which brought renowned filmmakers including Quentin Tarantino, Sam Fuller, and John Woo to Nottingham.

The cinema regularly curates unique film seasons and events, including immersive film marathons, horror all-nighters, and retrospective screenings. Recent examples include "Double Take," exploring dreams and doubles with rare screenings, "Fight Like a Girl," celebrating action heroines, and a retrospective on the landmark cinematic year of 1999.

== Funding ==
Broadway Cinema operates as a not-for-profit organisation, with income from the café bar and cinema being used to support its mission of inspiring a lifelong love of film. This is achieved through outreach projects, reduced ticket prices including a Pay What You Can model (£2–£10) for family matinees and select screenings, discounts for charities and community groups, and accessible programming.

In 2006, Broadway Cinema underwent a major redevelopment with funding from the National Lottery and Arts Council England. Works were completed in October 2006 and cost around £6 million. The redevelopment expanded the cinema to four screens, including the world's first (and only) cinema screen designed by Sir Paul Smith.

In 2019, Broadway invested £390,000 of its own resources in a cinema refurbishment project, upgrading seating in all four screens including reupholstering the Paul Smith Screen (Screen 4) seats in the designer's signature "Big Stripe" design. The project also included upgrades to 7.1 surround sound, installation of new hearing loops, and the addition of 4K projection in Screens 1 and 2. Capacity in Screen 1 was reduced from 350 to 248 to increase seat widths and leg room. As part of the renovation, Broadway donated 268 seats to Nottingham Arts Theatre.

In 2020, Broadway was awarded £499,744 from Arts Council England's National Lottery funded Small Capital programme to continue its major refurbishment project, focusing on improving environmental sustainability, the terrace, foyer, and both bars.

== Community Engagement and Accessibility ==
Broadway Cinema plays a central role in Nottingham's diverse communities, providing a welcoming space where different groups can celebrate and showcase their stories. The cinema engages in outreach work with different communities across the city and platforms stories from around the world. Broadway has offered year-round support for Nottingham Pride, with dedicated screenings and live events during Pride weekend since 1997.

The cinema is committed to accessibility, delivering over 700 captioned screenings annually and participating in the Watchword glasses trial for D/deaf and hard of hearing audiences. Broadway offers adapted monthly screenings with adjusted lighting and sound for neurodiverse audiences, and hosts "Cosy Club" events where audiences can knit or draw during screenings. The venue is annually audited by AccessAble, with accessibility reports published on its website.

Broadway is committed to reducing its environmental impact through sustainable practices including eliminating single-use plastics, introducing compostable packaging, and improving waste separation. The cinema tracks its carbon footprint using Julie's Bicycle tools, achieving a 35% reduction in emissions between 2015–16 and 2024–25.

== Resident Filmmakers ==
Broadway Cinema is home to several award-winning filmmakers and production companies. Documentary filmmaker Jeanie Finlay has edited most of her films at Broadway, including Game of Thrones: The Last Watch for HBO and Seahorse: The Dad Who Gave Birth. Wellington Films, a production company founded by Rachel Robey and Alastair Clark, has been based at Broadway since 2000 and has produced notable films including the BAFTA Scotland Award-winning Calibre, BAFTA-nominated Sister Midnight and London to Brighton.

Film director Shane Meadows worked out of the venue for many years and continues to support the cinema through fundraising Q&As and use it as a base.

Broadway has delivered the BFI Film Academy Short Course for over 12 years as the lead partner for the East Midlands, supporting over 230 young people aged 16–19 from diverse backgrounds to take their first steps towards careers in film and television through free intensive training with industry professionals.

== Notable Visitors ==
Broadway Cinema has welcomed numerous celebrated filmmakers and actors over its history. In 1992 and 1993, Quentin Tarantino visited the cinema, with Broadway hosting the UK premiere of Pulp Fiction in 1993 immediately after its screening at the Cannes Film Festival. Other notable visitors have included filmmakers Sam Fuller and John Woo, actor Sir Ian McKellen in 1995, Sir Norman Wisdom and more recently, Bella Ramsey and Vicky McClure.

Actor Samantha Morton has described Broadway Cinema as "her favourite cinema anywhere".

Notable visitors that come through Broadway Cinema sign the projector in Screen 2 as a record of their attendance. Images of these signatures can be found on the first floor Mezz Bar.

== History ==
1839-1954 | Chapel to Cultural Landmark

In the heart of Nottingham, 1839 marked the birth of a bold vision. Amidst a national recession, £11,000 was raised - equivalent to around £1.4 million today - to construct a grand Wesleyan chapel on Broad Street. Designed to seat 1,900 worshippers, it quickly became a spiritual and architectural beacon.

Five years later, in 1844, the chapel played host to a moment that would ripple through history. During a visit by American evangelist Rev. James Caughey, a young man named William Booth - then a pawnbroker’s apprentice - found faith within its walls. Booth would go on to found the Salvation Army, and today, a brass plaque in Broadway’s foyer commemorates his transformation.

By 1909, the chapel was thriving. A magnificent organ was commissioned from Norman and Beard, filling the space with music that echoed its grandeur. Through the interwar years, the chapel’s Sunday School and Boys’ Brigade flourished, nurturing generations of young minds.

World War II brought unexpected change. In 1941, the basement was repurposed by Nottingham Council as a British Restaurant—a communal kitchen feeding those displaced or rationed by the war. The building adapted to serve its community in new ways.

But by 1947, the congregation faced mounting costs and dwindling numbers. The need for a new roof and limited funds led to the chapel’s closure in 1954. Yet, this was not the end - it was the beginning of a new chapter.

1959 - 1966 | The Co-operative Education Centre

In 1959, the former chapel was reborn. After major redevelopment, it reopened as the Co-operative Education Centre, a vibrant hub for music, cinema, and dance. The top floor housed a cinema - now Screen 1 - while the legendary Rainbow Rooms below pulsed with life.

Jazz artists from the USA and rising British bands graced the Rainbow Rooms stage. In 1962, The Beatles were booked to perform, but fame intervened: “Love Me Do” hit the charts, and they pulled out. Today, Broadway’s Café Bar sits where those electric nights once unfolded.

The cinema upstairs became a cultural cornerstone. The Nottingham Film Society screened international and archive films monthly, and began discussions with the British Film Institute (BFI) to gain official status.

By 1966, the Nottingham Film Theatre opened its doors, one of the first BFI-supported Regional Film Theatres in the UK. It screened films three days a week, laying the groundwork for Broadway’s cinematic legacy.

1974 - 1983 | Film and Art in the 1970

The 1970s saw Nottingham’s creative spirit flourish. In 1974, East Midlands Arts appointed its first Film Officer, Alan Fountain, sparking a wave of innovation. A year later, the Independent Film Makers Association (IFA-EM) formed, championing accessible filmmaking from script to screen.

The BFI began promoting “contextual programming”, films shown within themed events, supported by talks and documentation. Nottingham Film Theatre embraced this, launching “Challenge to Imperialism,” a Friday night series accompanied by 100-page booklets. This approach would shape Broadway’s future programming ethos.

Meanwhile, the Midland Group transformed into a contemporary arts centre on Carlton Street. It became home to the New Cinema Workshop, which absorbed IFA-EM, and launched the New Cinema - a 75-seat basement venue dedicated to experimental film.

These developments attracted international attention. In 1981, Frank Abbott and Steve Neale published a seminal paper in Framework: The Journal of Cinema and Media, exploring the intersection of film production and exhibition. Their questions - about audience engagement, cinematic norms, and cultural impact - still resonate in Broadway’s mission today.

1984 - 1987 | Towards Broadway

By the mid-1980s, Nottingham’s creative community was ready to dream bigger. In 1984, informal meetings began at the Midland Group to respond to the BFI’s media centre proposals. Artists, academics, councils, and film societies came together, forming the Nottingham Media Centre Consortium.

In 1985, the Consortium published “Nottingham as a Media Centre,” a visionary proposal advocating for a community-led, pan-media hub. It emphasized production and exhibition across all media - not just cinema - and called for grassroots development.

In 1986 the BFI was won over by the Nottingham Media Consortium's approach to developing a Media Centre in Nottingham. It agreed to fund a consultant to develop the project - working with NMC. Malcolm Allen was appointed in May that year

CODA, a pioneering organisation offering digital arts training to unemployed people, joined the Consortium in 1986. Their “NewLine” project taught digital art and MIDI music, operating from 7b Broad Street a space that became a hive of activity.

In 1987, the Midland Group closed, but its legacy lived on. The New Cinema and Nottingham Film Theatre merged to form City Lights, a full-time cinema programme. The Consortium gained momentum, launching working groups to explore media exhibition and production. The vision of Broadway was crystallising.

1988 - 1990 | Broadway Begins

In 1988, after years of planning and collaboration, the Nottingham Media Centre Consortium secured the Co-operative Education Centre building on Broad Street. Funding came from Nottingham City Council, Nottinghamshire County Council, and the BFI - a testament to the project’s significance.

The Consortium registered as Nottingham Media Centre Limited, a not-for-profit company and charity. In 1989, the building was officially named Broadway, and Adrian Wootton (now Adrian Wootton OBE) was appointed its first Director. The BFI-funded consultancy concluded, and Malcolm Allen moved on to new ventures.

Development work began in earnest. Teams were assembled, spaces transformed, and the spirit of collaboration infused every corner. On 31 August 1990, Broadway opened its doors with its first screening: Enemies: A Love Story.
