= Samuel Sutton Rawlinson =

Samuel Sutton Rawlinson (1809 – 18 July 1880) was an architect and engineer known for his work in Nottingham.

== Life ==
He was born in Wallingford, Berkshire in 1809, son of George Rawlinson. In 1827 he was living in Bridgwater, Somerset as an articled clerk to Richard Carver. His father was also in Bridgwater as a lace manufacturer.

In 1853 he was on the board of the Scottish Widows' Fund Life Assurance Society, and later he worked as a dealer in lace and silk in Clapham.

He was clearly successful in business as his estate was valued at £60,000 (equivalent to £7,540,000 in 2023) on his death on 18 July 1880.

A stained glass window was inserted in St Peter's Church, Streatham, in memory of him and his wife Ann, in 1882, by their children.

== Buildings and works ==
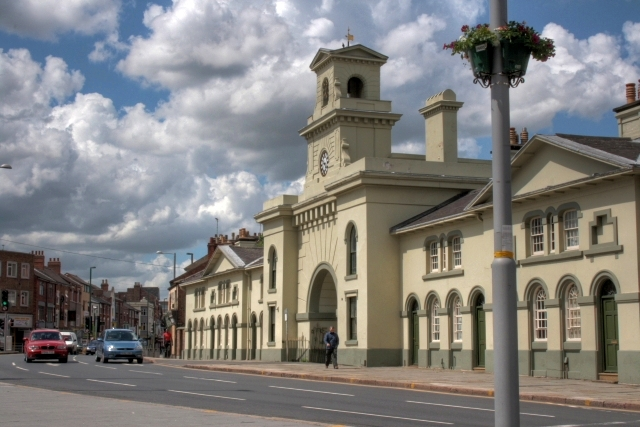
Canning Terrace, Nottingham

- Nottingham General Cemetery 1836
- Canning Terrace Nottingham 1837–1840
- Broad Street Wesleyan Church 1839
