= Broad Street Wesleyan Church =

Broad Street Wesleyan Chapel
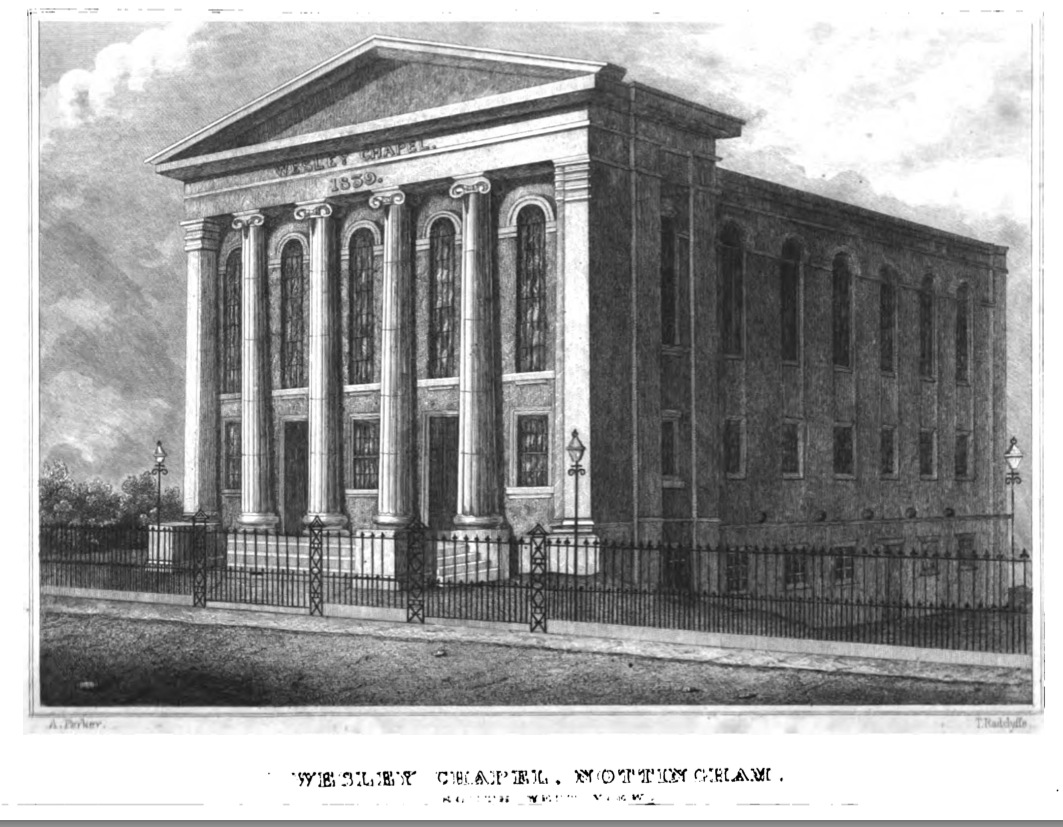
- Broad Street Wesleyan Chapel from the History and Antiquities of Nottingham. James Orange. 1840.
- Broad Street Wesleyan Chapel
- 52.955108°N 1.144958°W
- Location: Nottingham
- Country: England
- Denomination: Wesleyan Methodist

Architecture
- Architect: Samuel Sutton Rawlinson
- Completed: 1839
- Construction cost: £9,000

Specifications
- Length: 97.6 feet (29.7 m)
- Width: 64 feet (20 m)

Broad Street Wesleyan Chapel was a former Methodist chapel in Nottingham from 1839 to 1954. The building is now occupied by the Broadway Cinema.

== History ==
The church was built in 1839 by the architect S. S. Rawlinson. It had sittings for 1,920 people, and a school room for 400 children. The cost of construction was £9,000 (equivalent to £807,261 in 2025). It opened on 20 June 1839 when the opening collections were £1,870.

It was the place where, during the visit of Rev. James Caughey in 1844, it is likely that the founder of the Salvation Army, William Booth, was converted.

In 1947 the congregation were confronted with the cost of a new roof and dwindling numbers led to closure in 1954.

The building was bought by Nottingham Cooperative Society to use as an Educational Centre. Together with the Nottingham and District Film Society the Co-operative Educational Centre opened in 1959. This later became a British Film Institute-supported venue, and later the Broadway Cinema.

== Organ ==
The church obtained a second-hand organ when first opened by Mr Ward of York. This was then replaced by a new organ in 1909 by Norman and Beard. This 1909 organ was later donated to the University of Nottingham where it resides in the Great Hall. A specification of the organ can be found on the National Pipe Organ Register.

=== Organists ===
- George Middleton (formerly organist of Emmanuel Church, Nottingham)
- William Vivian Todd 1948 – ????
