= Listed buildings in Papplewick =

Papplewick is a civil parish in the Gedling district of Nottinghamshire, England. The parish contains 32 listed buildings that are recorded in the National Heritage List for England. Of these, two are listed at Grade I, the highest of the three grades, one is at Grade II*, the middle grade, and the others are at Grade II, the lowest grade. The parish contains the village of Papplewick and the surrounding countryside. Most of the listed buildings are in the village, and they consist of a church and items in the churchyard, a country house and associated structures, houses, cottages and associated structures, farmhouses and farm buildings, and a public house. In the eastern part of the parish is Papplewick Pumping Station, which contains a number of listed buildings. Elsewhere, two boundary stones and two commemorative obelisks are listed.

== Key ==
| Grade | Criteria |
|---|---|
| I | Buildings of exceptional interest, sometimes considered to be internationally important |
| II* | Particularly important buildings of more than special interest |
| II | Buildings of national importance and special interest |

== Buildings ==
| Name and location | Photograph | Date | Notes | Grade |
|---|---|---|---|---|
| St James' Church; 53.05832°N 1.18722°W | | 14th century | The oldest part of the church is the tower, the rest of the church being rebuilt in 1795. It is built in stone, and consists of a nave and a chancel under a continuous roof, a south porch, an organ chamber, and a west tower. The tower has two stages, a canted stair turret to the northwest, a moulded string course, two-light bell openings with hood moulds, and an embattled parapet with corner crocketed pinnacles. There are also embattled parapets on the body of the church, ramped up to the tower and in the centre of the porch, and crocketed pinnacles. The porch has a pointed doorway with a crocketed ogee hood and an initialled and dated tympanum, above which is a pedimented gable with a quatrefoil, and inside the porch are stone benches. | I |
| Two headstones 53.05815°N 1.18719°W | — | 1690 | The headstones are in the churchyard of St James' Church to the southeast of the south porch. They are in stone, one has rounded corners and the other has square corners, and both carry inscriptions. | II |
| Chest tomb 53.05819°N 1.18732°W | — | 1695 | The chest tomb is in the churchyard of St James' Church to the south of the south porch. It is in stone, and has a moulded base and corners. On the long sides are panels with ornamented borders and crossed fleur-de-lys shafts, and the end panels contain a stag's head and a rosette. The lid is incised, and the inscription is mostly illegible. | II |
| Three headstones 53.05821°N 1.18734°W | — | Early 17th century | The headstones are in the churchyard of St James' Church to the south of the tower. They are in stone, the one to the left is plain, the middle stone has chamfered corners and a raised moulded border, and the stone to the right has a triangular head, relief carving and a lattice panel. All have inscriptions. | II |
| 1 Linby Lane and The Barn; 53.05415°N 1.18291°W | — | Early 18th century | A farmhouse and a barn converted into two houses, they are in stone, on a plinth, with quoins and pantile roofs. There are two storeys and an L-shaped plan, with a front range of two bays. In the centre of the north front is a doorway with chamfered jambs, and the windows are a mix of sashes and casements, some with mullions. | II |
| Chetwynd House and wall 53.06017°N 1.18341°W | — | Early 18th century | The service wing of Papplewick Hall converted into a house, it is in stone with quoins, moulded eaves and a hipped slate roof. There are two storeys and five unequal bays. In the south front is a doorway with a four-centred arch, and a blocked carriage entrance containing a doorway, Most of the windows are mullioned cross casements, at the rear are French windows, and in the roof are dormers with segmental heads, and a louvred ridge ventilator. Outside the house is a curved boundary wall with flat coping containing a doorway with a chamfered surround. | II |
| Papplewick Lodge and stables 53.05749°N 1.18259°W | | Early 18th century | The house and stables are in stone, with roofs of tile and slate. The house has rusticated quoins, two storeys, a double depth L-shaped plan with a front range of four bays. The windows are a mix of sashes and casements, some with keystones, there are two two-storey canted bay windows, an oriel window and French windows. The stable range to the west has six bays and an L-shaped plan, and its openings include horizontally-sliding sash windows with keystones. | II |
| Mortons' Farmhouse; 53.05710°N 1.18268°W | | Mid 18th century | The farmhouse, later a private house, is in stone with a pantile roof. There are two storeys, a double depth plan, three bays, and a single-storey extension on the right. The left bay is recessed, and contains a doorway with a hood on shaped brackets. The windows are a mix of casements and horizontally-sliding sashes, and at the rear are two large bay windows. | II |
| Walled kitchen garden, Papplewick Hall; 53.06230°N 1.18543°W | | Mid 18th century | The kitchen garden is enclosed by brick walls with flat stone coping, forming a rectangular plan. In the centre of the north and south walls are gateways flanked by square piers with flat caps, and in the east and west walls are doorways with segmental heads. The free-standing transverse walls were heated, with a lean-to and three gabled stove houses to the north, and are four greenhouses to the south. At the east end is a stone sundial with an ogee head, and at the north end is a lean-to four-bay mushroom house. | II |
| The Griffin's Head; 53.05408°N 1.18246°W | | Mid 18th century | The public house is in stone, and has roofs of tile and slate with shouldered coped gables. There are two storeys and a double depth irregular L-shaped plan, and four bays. The windows are casements, some with segmental heads. On the west front is a gable containing a two-storey canted bay window with a hipped roof, and to the right is a hipped porch with two columns. | II |
| Boundary Stone at entrance to Newstead Grange; 53.06759°N 1.17648°W | | 1757 | The boundary stone is painted, and has a square plan and a pyramidal top. It carries an eroded inscription. | II |
| Boundary Stone on the northern boundary 53.06664°N 1.16443°W | — | 1757 | The boundary stone is in sandstone, and has a square plan and a pyramidal top. It carries the date and an initial on the south face, and an initial on the north face. | II |
| 67, 69, 71 and 73 Main Street; 53.05765°N 1.18203°W | | Late 18th century | A row of four stone cottages with pantile roofs, two storeys and eight bays. Each cottage has a central gabled porch, and most of the windows are horizontally-sliding sashes. At the rear is a later weatherboarded wing on a stone plinth. | II |
| Stable Range, Papplewick Hall; 53.06055°N 1.18334°W | — | Late 18th century | The stable range, which has been converted into houses, is in stone on a plinth, with slate roofs. It is in one and two storeys, and forms a U-shaped plan around a courtyard, with fronts of five and six bays, plus a wing to the north. Most of the openings have round heads, and most of the windows are mullioned casements. The middle bay of the north range projects under a pediment, and contains three elliptical carriage entrances. On the east side is a boundary wall with flat coping containing a pair of square gate piers with moulded bases and corniced capitals. | II |
| Pembroke Cottage. 51 and 53 Main Street; 53.05670°N 1.18270°W | | Late 18th century | A farmhouse and two cottages in stone, with roofs of tile and slate and a single coped gable, and two storeys. The windows are a mix of casements and horizontally-sliding sashes, some with segmental heads, At the rear are a lean-to extension, a three-bay barn and a three-bay outbuilding. | II |
| The Old Post Office; 53.05690°N 1.18268°W | — | Late 18th century | The house is in stone on a plinth, with a pantile roof. There are two storeys, an L-shaped plan, a front range of three bays, and a single-storey lean-to at the rear. The windows are a mix of casements and horizontally-sliding sashes. | II |
| Barn and stable, Top Farmhouse; 53.06183°N 1.18191°W | — | Late 18th century | The barn and stable are in stone with hipped pantile roofs. The barn has three bays. On the south side are a pair of doors with a segmental head, a blocked doorway and a blocked pitch hole, and on the north side are doors and vents. The stable has two storeys, and contains a casement window, a garage door, vents and a loading door. | II |
| Top Farmhouse and stables 53.06159°N 1.18202°W | | c. 1782 | The farmhouse is in stone, with floor and eaves bands, dentilled eaves, and a slate roof with coped gables. There are two storeys and attics, and five bays, the middle three bays projecting under a pediment containing a Diocletian window. In the centre is a Doric portico, and the windows are casements, some with mullions, and some with round heads. At the rear is a lean-to stable block with five bays. | II |
| Papplewick Hall; 53.05996°N 1.18334°W | | c. 1785 | A county house in stone, on plinth, with rusticated quoins, floor and sill bands, a cornice and a blocking course, and a hipped slate roof. There are three storeys and a basement, fronts of four and five bays, and there is a later single-storey billiard room. The middle bay of the west front projects lightly under a pediment, the ground floor is rusticated, the middle three bays contain round-headed recesses with sash windows, and the outer bays contain sash windows with moulded architraves and cornices. The upper floors are divided by pilasters, the windows have flat heads, and the central window in the middle floor has a cornice on scroll brackets. On the three-bay east front is a rusticated flat-roofed porch with a balustrade, containing a round-headed doorway with a fanlight. Above, the middle bay projects, and is flanked by paired Ionic pilasters, and the central window in the middle floor has a shouldered architrave and a pediment. | I |
| Howe Plantation Obelisk; 53.06545°N 1.15290°W | — | 1794 | A commemorative sandstone obelisk, it is octagonal, and stands on an octagonal pier with a moulded base and top. On the side is a raised oval inscribed panel. | II |
| Gate piers and wall, St James' Church; 53.05796°N 1.18656°W | | 1795 | Each stone gate pier has a moulded plinth, an impost band, a billeted cornice, and a crocketed pinnacle and finial. On each side is a round-headed blank panel and a quatrefoil. The later boundary wall is coped, it extends for 5 metres (16 ft), and contains a square pier with a pyramidal cap. | II |
| Obelisk near Vincent Lodge; 53.05399°N 1.16307°W | — | 1797 | A commemorative stone obelisk, it is octagonal, and stands on an octagonal pedestal with a moulded plinth and cornice. On it is an inscription and date. | II |
| 9A, 9B, 11, 15, 17, 19, 21, 23 and 25 Main Street; 53.05503°N 1.18303°W | | c. 1800 | A row of eight, later nine, cottages in stone, partly rendered, with pantile roofs. There are two storeys and an L-shaped plan, with a front rage of 16 bays. Each cottage has a gabled porch, and most of the windows are horizontally-sliding sashes. | II |
| Sundial, Papplewick Lodge; 53.05766°N 1.18268°W | — | 1819 | The sundial in the garden at the rear of the house is in stone. It has a square inscribed and dated base, a square baluster-shaped stem and a bronze dial. | II |
| Stable and garage, Mortons' Farmhouse; 53.05698°N 1.18270°W | | Early 19th century | The stable and garage are in stone with a pantile roof, and a single storey. The east gable front facing the road contains a window and a blocked doorway, and in the north front are casement windows and doorways, including a pair of sliding doors. | II |
| Engine house, boiler house and workshop, Papplewick Pumping Station; 53.06327°N 1.13160°W | | 1881 | The buildings were designed by M. O. Tarbotton, and are in brick with dressings in stone and terracotta, and slate roofs. The engine house has a plinth, a moulded sill band, billeted eaves, reeded pilasters with palmette capitals, and a hipped roof with an iron ridge and finials. The windows are round-headed with linked hood moulds. On the east front, balustraded steps lead up to a porch with a mansard roof on balusters and herms. On the roof is a ventilator with a pyramidal roof and a finial. The boiler house is three bays long and six bays wide, and has round-headed windows. The workshop has six bays, and on the roof are four gabled dormers. | II* |
| Superintendent's house, Papplewick Pumping Station; 53.06377°N 1.13068°W | | 1883 | The house was designed by M. O. Tarbotton, and is in brick on a plinth, with stone dressings, a string course, a dentilled sill band, machicolated eaves, and a slate roof with bargeboards. There are two storeys and an irregular L-shaped plan, with a front range of three bays. The windows are a mix of mullioned and transomed casements, and lancets. On the south side is a gabled wing with a canted bay window, and in the angle is a porch with a wooden balustrade on curved brackets. The east side has a gabled wing with a square bay window, and a triple lancet window with a carved and dated tympanum. At the rear is a tower with a parapet and a hipped roof, and outside the house are stone steps with a moulded balustrade and four octagonal piers. | II |
| Boiler house chimney, Papplewick Pumping Station; 53.06314°N 1.13240°W | | 1884 | The chimney was designed by M. O. Tarbotton, and is in brick with stone dressings. It has a square plan, and is about 120 feet (37 m) high. The base is square with coping, the shaft has moulded pilasters, and there is a dentilled main cornice, triple lancets, a truncated pyramidal finial, and four corniced pinnacles with pyramidal caps. | II |
| Boundary wall and gates, Papplewick Pumping Station; 53.06286°N 1.13017°W | | 1884 | The wall and gateways were designed by M. O. Tarbotton. The wall is in red brick with some blue brick, on a stone plinth, with a moulded corbelled top and ramped flat stone coping, and it extends for about 220 metres (720 ft). The south gateway has two square moulded piers with carved capitals, and stepped pyramidal caps. At the north end, the gateway has four similar piers, the capitals carved with birds, and the pyramidal caps have crocketed finials. Between the piers are cast iron gates with scroll tops, and there is a pair of matching wicket gates. | II |
| Cooling pond, Papplewick Pumping Station; 53.06301°N 1.13090°W | | 1884 | The cooling pond was designed by M. O. Tarbotton. It is rectangular with shaped ends, and is surrounded by a stone wall with moulded coping. In the centre is a circular cast iron basin. | II |
| Deputy's House, Papplewick Pumping Station; 53.06230°N 1.13070°W | | 1884 | The house was designed by M. O. Tarbotton, and is in brick with stone dressings, a string course, a sill band, machicolated eaves, and a slate roof with bargeboards. There are two storeys, an L-shaped plan, a main range of three bays, and a lean-to extension. The doorway has a lean-to hood on brackets, most of the windows are mullioned and transomed casements, and there are two bay windows, one canted and the other square. Outside are stone steps with a moulded balustrade and four octagonal piers. | II |
| Smithy, stable and cartshed, Papplewick Pumping Station; 53.06340°N 1.13232°W | — | 1884 | The buildings were designed by M. O. Tarbotton. They are in red brick with dressings in stone and blue brick, billeted and dentilled eaves, and hipped slate roofs with an iron ridge and finials, and a pierced valance. There is a single storey and nine bays. The openings include four with round heads, moulded surrounds and hood moulds, five with square concrete piers, and three infilled with weatherboarding. On the roof are five louvred dormers. | II |
