= City of Nottingham Water Department =

Former water department responsible for water supply in Nottingham (1880–1974)

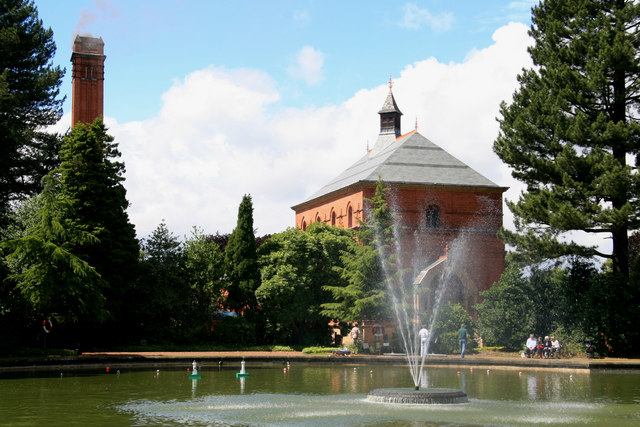
- Papplewick Pumping Station was the first to be built after the Nottingham Waterworks Company was taken over by the Corporation.
- Industry: Water and sewage
- Founded: 1880
- Defunct: 1974
- Fate: Taken over
- Successor: Severn Trent Water Authority
- Headquarters: Nottingham, England
- Key people: Thomas Hawksley, Marriott Ogle Tarbotton

The City of Nottingham Water Department (1912–1974), formerly the Nottingham Corporation Water Department (1880–1912), was responsible for the supply of water to Nottingham from 1880 to 1974. The first water supply company in the town was the Nottingham Waterworks Company, established in 1696, which took water from the River Leen, and later from springs at Scotholme, when the river became polluted. Other companies were set up in the late 18th century and in 1824, while in 1826 the Trent Water Company was established. They employed Thomas Hawksley as their engineer, who became one of the great water engineers of the period, and Nottingham had the first constant pressurised water supply system in the country. The various companies amalgamated in 1845, and Hawksley remained as the consulting engineer until 1879.

Nottingham is located on top of a huge layer of Bunter sandstone, and Hawksley masterminded plans to extract filtered water from this aquifer. The Park Hill or Sion Hill pumping station was the first to be built in 1850, but was abandoned in 1880 as the water was too hard, and there were fears of pollution from the General Cemetery. Bagthorpe or Basford Works followed in 1857, and as the town expanded, further works were built to the north. Bestwood Pumping Station opened in 1871. The pumping stations were steam powered, and Hawksley also constructed a number of reservoirs to store the water, the final one under his jurisdiction being at Papplewick, completed just before water supply was taken over by the Corporation in 1880.

Acquisition of the water company by the Corporation was first considered in 1852, but the water company resisted the proposals, and when Marriott Ogle Tarbotton was appointed as Borough Engineer in 1859, he had more serious issues to contend with, including sewage disposal and upgrading the infrastructure of a town which had expanded very rapidly in a short period. Takeover eventually happened in 1880, when the Nottingham Corporation Water Department was created, and Tarbotton commissioned the building of Papplewick Pumping Station, which was completed in 1884. Boughton Pumping Station, which was opened in 1905, was the last to use large-diameter wells, as other sites used boreholes. The first of these was at Burton Joyce, started at a similar time to Boughton, but completed in 1898.

Nottingham became a city in 1897, and the water department was renamed as the City of Nottingham Water Department in 1912. The Corporation co-operated with Derby, Leicester, Sheffield and Derbyshire County, to create the Derwent Valley Water Board in 1899. Plans to construct reservoirs in the Derwent Valley in Derbyshire came to fruition in 1912 when Howden Reservoir was completed, although Nottingham did not use the water until 1917, due to quality issues. Derwent Reservoir followed in 1916, and Ladybower Reservoir in 1945. Five more borehole stations were built between 1945 and 1969, and steam engines were replaced by electric pumps in the 1960s. A new works and reservoir at Church Wilne on the Derwent was completed in 1967, but the planned reservoir at Carsington Water took until 1992 to complete. Meanwhile, water supply and sewerage ceased to be the responsibility of the City of Nottingham, and became part of the remit of the Severn Trent Water Authority in 1974. Following privatisation of the water industry in 1989, the responsibility passed to Severn Trent Water, one of ten water and sewage companies in England and Wales.

== Early history 1696–1880 ==
=== (Old) Nottingham Waterworks Company ===
Prior to 1696, water for the people of Nottingham was obtained from the river or from shallow wells, and carriers, known as Higglers, delivered it to those who wanted it. In 1696, the first Nottingham Waterworks Company obtained a lease from the Corporation, allowing it to build pumps and a water wheel to drive them, to extract water from the River Leen. The water was pumped to a reservoir to the east of Park Row, from where a network of pipes fed much of the town. The waterwheel and pumps were very similar to a system which the engineer George Sorocold had installed at London Bridge, and he may have been associated with the Nottingham scheme, but it is also possible that it was the Nottingham engineer Peter Whalley who designed it. In the eighteenth century Nottingham experienced rapid growth, as a result of the development of the frame knitting industry and the lace industry, with the population expanding five-fold from 10,000 in 1720 to 50,000 in 1830. The River Leen could no longer provide sufficient water to meet the need, and it also became polluted with sewage and industrial waste. Increasingly, there were complaints about the quality of the water.

By 1830 the River Leen was sufficiently polluted that it was abandoned as a source of water, and instead, the company constructed a reservoir covering about 1 acre (0.40 ha) in Scotholme, which was fed by spring water. They also constructed a new pumping station close to the Lean near Castle Rock. Water flowed by gravity from the new reservoir to the pumping station, through a 10-inch (25 cm) iron pipe, from where it was pumped to a service reservoir close to the site of the General Hospital. Power could be provided either by a 16 hp (12 kW) waterwheel or by a beam engine with a similar power output. The pumping station was located in Brewhouse Yard, and appeared on the first edition of the Ordnance Survey maps in 1880.

=== Zion Hill Water and Marble Works ===
A second private company, the Zion Hill Water and Marble Works was formed in the late 18th century. Zion Hill was in the Canning Circus area, and the company had two wells near Alfreton Road. The wells were 230 feet (70 m) deep, from which water was pumped by steam engines, which also powered some lace making machines and saws to cut marble. They supplied a fairly small area with good quality water, partly through pipes, and also by using water carriers to deliver the product. The company had ceased to function independently by 1824.

=== Nottingham New Waterworks Company ===
In order to supply water to the north-eastern part of the city, the Nottingham New Waterworks Company built the Northern Waterworks on North Sherwood Street. Operation commenced on 1 December 1824, with water pumped by a steam engine from a well into a cistern. Some of the water was piped to homes, and some was supplied to carriers.

=== Trent Waterworks Company ===
Nottingham Water Act 1826
- Act of Parliament
- Parliament of the United Kingdom
- Long title: An Act for better supplying with Water the Inhabitants of the Town of Nottingham and its Vicinity.
- Citation: 7 Geo. 4. c. cxi
- Territorial extent: United Kingdom

Dates
- Royal assent: 26 May 1826
- Commencement: 26 May 1826 (Note: The Acts of Parliament (Commencement) Act 1793.)
- Repealed: 30 June 1845

Other legislation
- Repealed by: Nottingham Waterworks Act 1845

Status: Repealed

Text of statute as originally enacted

With demand for water outstripping the available sources, the Trent Waterworks Company was formed by an act of Parliament, the Nottingham Water Act 1826 (7 Geo. 4. c. cxi), in May 1826, and in 1830 employed Thomas Hawksley to design and build a new waterworks at Trent Bridge. Hawksley had been born and educated in Nottingham, and at the age of 15 had started an apprenticeship with Edward Staveley, who ran an architectural practice and was Borough Surveyor. They were joined by Robert Jalland, and the three men later became partners. Hawksley was 23 when he was appointed engineer to the Trent Bridge works, which were completed in 1831. He constructed brick tunnels in the beds of sand and gravel on the north side of the River Trent, which filtered the water before it was collected in a rectangular reservoir. From there it was pumped by a single cylinder beam engine through an 18-inch (46 cm) cast iron pipe to a service reservoir at Park Row.

Hawksley wanted water to be available constantly, whereas most engineers of the time favoured an intermittent system, where the water was supplied infrequently, and used to fill cisterns. Thus Thomas Wicksteed and James Simpson, who were working for the London water companies, believed that such a system was unworkable, as taps and fittings would soon start to leak, resulting in it being impossible to supply the volume of water required to keep the system pressurised. Hawksley addressed this by designing fittings that were more robust, and which could be repaired easily if they did start to leak. The job of convincing plumbers to use them was difficult, but he persisted, and Nottingham had the first constant pressurised system in the country. This prevented contamination from entering the clean water mains. Much of the country was affected by outbreaks of cholera in 1832, at which point the Trent Waterworks Company was supplying water to some 15,000 people, out of a total population of around 53,000. 289 people died in Nottingham, but when there was a further nationwide outbreak in 1848, Nottingham was virtually unaffected. The town's Sanitary Committee were convinced that a major factor was the availability of a clean, filtered water supply, although the mechanism by which water-borne diseases such as cholera were transmitted was not clearly understood at that time.

Writing in 1935, J. Holland Walker reported:

At the northern end of Trent Bridge, about on the site now occupied by the Town Arms Hotel, stood the old water works of Nottingham, which were such a charming feature of the landscape forty or fifty years ago, but which have now completely disappeared. A tall brick chimney, mellowed from its first rawness by age, and a grove of well-grown trees marked the old pumping station. There was a great settling tank, or reservoir, receiving water from the River Trent, which reservoir occupied both sides of the road, and a faint echo of which remains in the gardens between Messrs. Turney's works and the river. After this water had passed the filter-bed it was pumped to the reservoir on the eastern side at the upper end of Park Row. For many years this reservoir was open, and surrounded by trees, and was an extremely picturesque object, but some forty or fifty years ago it was covered over by a great concrete roof, which has remained until 1925, when it was broken with considerable difficulty, and the site devoted to the erection of an out-patients' department for the Nottingham General Hospital. These waterworks at Trent Bridge and also the reservoir on Park Row, were erected in 1831, and we are informed that the water was forced through the mains from Trent Bridge by an engine of forty horse power, at the rate of ten hogsheads per minute. The reservoir is a hundred and thirty feet above the Trent, and in 1850 the water distributed from it through about twelve miles of pipe to the neighbouring districts.

=== Nottingham Waterworks Company ===
Nottingham Waterworks Act 1845
- Act of Parliament
- Parliament of the United Kingdom
- Long title: An Act for granting more effectual Powers for supplying with Water the Inhabitants of the Town and County of the Town of Nottingham, and certain Places adjacent thereto, in the County of Nottingham.
- Citation: 8 & 9 Vict. c. xix
- Territorial extent: United Kingdom

Dates
- Royal assent: 30 June 1845
- Commencement: 30 June 1845

Other legislation
- Amended by: Statute Law (Repeals) Act 1995

Status: Partially repealed

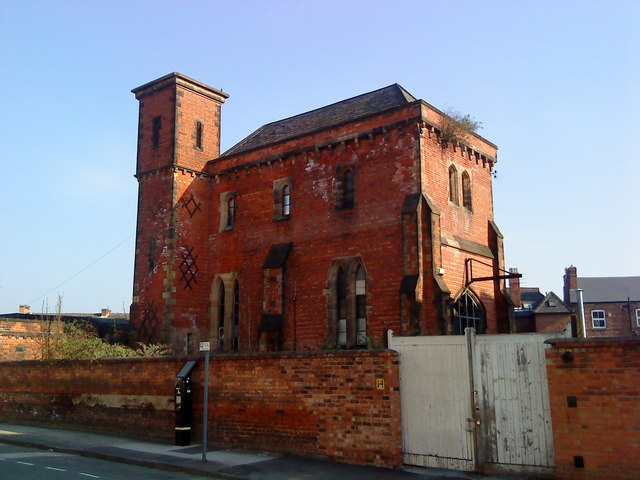
Park Hill pumping station on The Ropewalk was built in 1850, but abandoned in 1880 due to water quality issues.

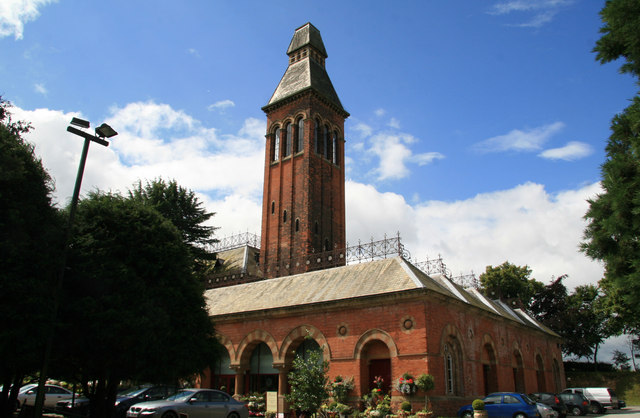
Bestwood Pumping Station was the last to be built by the Nottingham Waterworks Company in 1871.

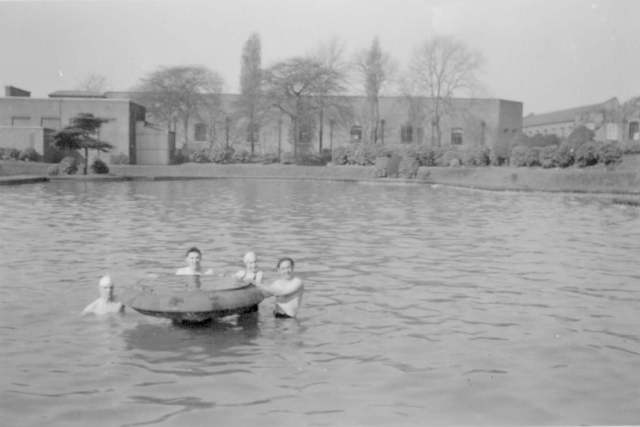
Severn Trent Water occupy the site of Basford Waterworks. The reservoir was used for cooling the exhaust water from the three beam engines, one of which has been preserved.

The St. Mary's Nottingham Inclosure Act 1845 (8 & 9 Vict. c. 7 Pr.) allowed the city to expand onto the surrounding land. The water companies had been in open competition for more than a decade, with no legal boundaries to define which areas each could supply, but to meet the challenges of the enlarging city, the Nottingham Waterworks Act 1845 (8 & 9 Vict. c. xix) was also obtained, which formally merged the three companies into one, to be known as Nottingham Waterworks Company. Hawksley, as the most prominent engineer involved with any of the original enterprises, became consulting engineer for the new company, a position that he held until it was taken over by the Corporation in 1879.

Nottingham sits on top of a huge area of Bunter sandstone, which holds large volumes of groundwater, which is prevented from seeping lower by an underlying layer of impermeable Permian marls. Bunter consists of loosely packed grains, which filter the water effectively, and does not contain soluble materials such as lime, resulting in the water being relatively soft. The new company looked to extract groundwater from the Bunter, and constructed the Park Hill or Sion Hill pumping station near The Ropewalk in 1850. A Cornish beam engine rated at 60 hp (45 kW) pumped water from two wells, which were around 240 feet (73 m) deep and 7 feet (2.1 m) in diameter. Water was pumped onwards to Park Row Reservoir through an iron pipe 8 inches (20 cm) in diameter, or to Belle Vue Reservoir through a 12-inch (30 cm) diameter pipe. The works supplied between 850,000 imperial gallons (3.9 Ml) and 900,000 imperial gallons (4.1 Ml) of water per day, but was abandoned in 1880 due to the hardness of the water, and fears of contamination from the General Cemetery.

The new Park Row Reservoir was constructed where Park Row joins The Ropewalk. The site for Belle Vue reservoir was obtained in 1846 by compulsory purchase using the powers that the Inclosure Commissioners had obtained in 1845. Ichabod Wright was reluctant to sell, because Toad Hole Hill was one of Nottingham's finest beauty spots. Hawksley's partner Robert Jalland designed the reservoir, which was 160 feet (49 m) long, 80 feet (24 m) wide and 12 feet (3.7 m) high, with the roof formed of 288 brick arches. The work was completed on 16 May 1851, and the reservoir could store 1.5 million imperial gallons (6.8 Ml) of water. Subsequently, T. C. Hine designed a second reservoir, which was built by John Loverseed. It was 220 feet (67 m) by 133 feet (41 m) in size, held 2.5 million imperial gallons (11 Ml) of water, and opened on 9 May 1864.

Bagthorpe Works, which was also known as Basford Works, was completed in 1857 on a site near the junction of Haydn Road and Hucknall Road. There were two wells which were around 110 feet (34 m) deep, and each was pumped by a 60 hp (45 kW) compound beam engine manufactured by R and W Hawthorn of Newcastle upon Tyne. The works was enlarged in 1868 when a third well was completed, pumped by an 80 hp (60 kW) single cylinder engine. Mapperley Hill reservoir was constructed at a similar time, being completed in 1859.

The next major expansion was the construction of Bestwood Pumping Station, some 5 miles (8 km) to the north of the city on the Mansfield Road. 6 acres (2.4 ha) of land were leased from the Duke of St Albans in Bestwood Park, and two wells each 176 feet (54 m) deep were sunk into the Bunter sandstone. Two 125 hp (93 kW) rotative beam engines were supplied by J. Witham and Sons of Leeds, and the water was pumped to a new reservoir at Redhill. Both the pumping station and the reservoir were completed in 1871. As a result of subsidence from coal mining, the pumping station is now about 4 feet (1.2 m) lower than when it was built, but the settlement has taken place gradually, and has not disrupted the operation of the works. Construction of a further reservoir at Papplewick was completed in 1880, just before the company was taken over by the Corporation, but it had to be abandoned in 1906 when it was damaged by subsidence.

== Nottingham Corporation Water Department ==
The Nottingham Improvement Act 1879 (42 & 43 Vict. c. cciv) empowered Nottingham Corporation to take over the Nottingham Waterworks Company, but the plan had been nearly 30 years in the making. By the early 1850s around 12 local authorities had gained control of their own water supplies. In 1852, the council had asked the water company for a reduction in their rates, as they were a large user of water. Prior to the formation of the Nottingham Water Company in 1845, the old Nottingham Water Company had supplied water to the various parishes within its area of supply without charge, when the water was used for cleaning the streets. The new company had a more commercial outlook, stating that they were intent on making a profit from their enterprise. A public meeting, attended by between 600 and 800 people on 2 November 1853, instructed the council to prepare to take over water supply and gas supply. The gas company was estimated to be worth £108,808, while the water company was estimated at £60,100. Manchester was quoted as a town where such a takeover had significantly reduced the cost of water, and operating surpluses were being used to fund public works.

Nottingham Waterworks Amendment Act 1854 (Note: Section 1.)
- Act of Parliament
- Parliament of the United Kingdom
- Long title: An Act for enabling the Nottingham Waterworks Company, to raise a further Sum of Money; and for amending some of the Provisions of the Act relating to such Company.
- Citation: 17 & 18 Vict. c. x
- Territorial extent: United Kingdom

Dates
- Royal assent: 12 May 1854
- Commencement: 12 May 1854
- Repealed: 8 November 1995

Other legislation
- Repealed by: Statute Law (Repeals) Act 1995

Status: Repealed

Text of statute as originally enacted

In early 1854, the waterworks company presented a bill to Parliament to allow them to increase their capital, which was passed as the Nottingham Waterworks Amendment Act 1854 (17 & 18 Vict. c. x). A motion for the council to buy the waterworks was defeated in a meeting on 6 February 1854, but they proposed to ask the company why they needed such a large increase in capital, to suggest that dividends on any such capital should be restricted to five per cent, that the provisions of the Waterworks Clauses Act 1847 (10 & 11 Vict. c. 17), which the sanitary reformer Edwin Chadwick had promoted to restrict profits that water companies could make, and to comply with all reasonable demands for water, should apply to the company, and that the council should be allowed to buy shares in the company, which would give them voting powers. The water company refused to consider any of these actions, and the issue of takeover lay dormant for a time.

Nottingham Waterworks Act 1874
- Act of Parliament
- Parliament of the United Kingdom
- Long title: An Act for granting further powers to the Nottingham Waterworks Company.
- Citation: 37 & 38 Vict. c. cxxxvii
- Territorial extent: United Kingdom

Dates
- Royal assent: 16 July 1874
- Commencement: 16 July 1874
- Repealed: 8 November 1995

Other legislation
- Repealed by: Statute Law (Repeals) Act 1995

Status: Repealed

Text of statute as originally enacted

Nottingham Waterworks Act 1878
- Act of Parliament
- Parliament of the United Kingdom
- Long title: An Act for granting further powers to the Nottingham Waterworks Company.
- Citation: 41 & 42 Vict. c. xlv
- Territorial extent: United Kingdom

Dates
- Royal assent: 27 May 1878
- Commencement: 27 May 1878
- Repealed: 8 November 1995

Other legislation
- Repealed by: Statute Law (Repeals) Act 1995

Status: Repealed

Text of statute as originally enacted

Nottingham Waterworks Act 1879
- Act of Parliament
- Parliament of the United Kingdom
- Long title: An Act for granting further powers to the Nottingham Waterworks Company.
- Citation: 42 & 43 Vict. c. xi
- Territorial extent: United Kingdom

Dates
- Royal assent: 23 May 1879
- Commencement: 23 May 1879
- Repealed: 8 November 1995

Other legislation
- Amended by: Statute Law (Repeals) Act 1995

Status: Partially repealed

Text of statute as originally enacted

On 6 October 1859, Marriott Ogle Tarbotton became the Borough Engineer, having been chosen from 52 applicants despite only being 24. He faced rather more pressing problems, particularly the disposal of sewage, and issues with the infrastructure resulting from the overcrowding that had occurred before the St. Mary's Nottingham Inclosure Act 1845 (8 & 9 Vict. c. 7 Pr.) had allowed the town to expand its borders. He was pre-occupied with these during the 1860s, although the issue of buying the waterworks company was pursued in 1869 and 1870, but the company refused to co-operate. The water company obtained several more acts of Parliament; the Nottingham Waterworks Act 1874 (37 & 38 Vict. c. cxxxvii), the Nottingham Waterworks Act 1878 (41 & 42 Vict. c. xlv) and the Nottingham Waterworks Act 1879 (42 & 43 Vict. c. xi), with the council opposing all of them. The council in turn had obtained improvement acts of Parliament in 1872 and the Nottingham Improvement Act 1874 (37 & 38 Vict. c. cxciv) which raised issues to do with water supply, and a similar act of Parliament, the Nottingham Improvement Act 1879 (42 & 43 Vict. c. cciv), gave them powers to take the waterworks company over. This was completed on 25 March 1880 with the formation of the Nottingham Corporation Water Department, during a period when the town experienced rapid growth. As a result of the Nottingham Borough Extension Act 1877 (40 & 41 Vict. c. xxxi) the population had increased from 86,621 in 1871 to 186,575 in 1881, while its area had increased from 1,996 acres (8.08 km^{2}) to 10,935 acres (44.25 km^{2}) during the same period.

On 25 May 1880 the Water Department invited the members of the Corporation to inspect the works of the important water undertaking recently acquired by the town. The tour began at the public offices in Albert Street from where the large party rode to Trent Bridge in private trams supplied by the Nottingham and District Tramways Company Limited. They travelled by tram again and then walked to the Castle Works. From there they proceeded to the Park Row reservoir, and then walked to the Sion Hill (Canning Circus) Works. From the top of the Derby Road, the tram cars were used for the journey to Scotholme Springs. The party then moved on in eight carriages to see Bagthorpe pumping station, Redhill reservoir, Papplewick reservoir and finally Bestwood Pumping Station, where they took a late lunch in a marquee in its grounds. A newspaper report the following day noted how well the late Water Company had managed its assets.

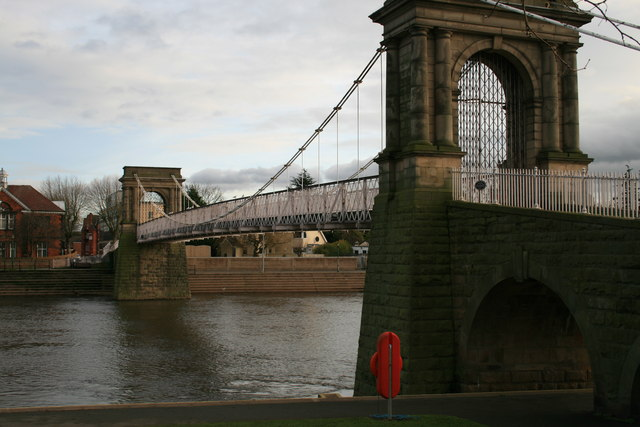
Wilford Suspension Bridge

Tarbotton ceased to be Borough Engineer, and became engineer for the gas works, which had been taken over in 1874, and of the water works. He set about improving the available supplies of water, constructing two wells at Papplewick, some 8 miles (13 km) to the north of Nottingham. The designs for the pumping station may well have been borrowed from Hawksley, who had previously negotiated with the landowner for rights to extract water, and James Watt and Co, who supplied the two large beam engines for Papplewick, noted the similarity between the design and that of a pumping station at Great Yarmouth, also designed by Hawksley. The first engine was run in September 1884, although the works were not declared to be complete until 12 April 1886. The two wells were 202 feet (62 m) deep, and were connected by adits which were 271 feet (83 m) long. Water was raised by ram pumps connected to the rotative beam engines. An additional reservoir was constructed at Mapperley, as well as a water main to link the two sites.

When Papplewick Pumping Station came on line, the Scotholme, Trent Bridge, and Brewhouse Yard works were abandoned, having been out of use since 1871, when the Bestwood pumping station had started to produce water. Tarbotton, who had overseen its construction, died unexpectedly on 6 March 1887, though his colleagues stated that he had worked too hard, without adequate rest and recreation, and had shown signs of stress during his final two years.

A report on 1898 identified the need for another pumping station, and a site at Boughton, 19 miles (31 km) north of the town centre was chosen. Three wells were built to a depth of around 168 feet (51 m), which were connected together by adits. Boreholes were then drilled from the adits to a depth of 350 feet (110 m), and water was raised by ram pumps powered by triple expansion steam engines. The station was the last to use wells, and when it was completed in 1905, it could produce 4.5 million imperial gallons (20 Ml) per day. Subsequent stations used boreholes, and the first of these was completed at Burton Joyce in 1898. Three more boreholes were drilled at the site in 1908, to a depth of 480 feet (150 m). In 1906, Wilford Suspension Bridge was built across the Trent to carry water mains and gas mains. The water fed a new reservoir at Wilford Hill in West Bridgford, which enabled the Park Row reservoir site to be sold to the General Hospital.

The five pumping stations now owned by the corporation drew water from the bunter sandstone and delivered it to covered reservoirs in the city, from where it was delivered by gravity to domestic and industrial consumers.

== City of Nottingham Water Department ==
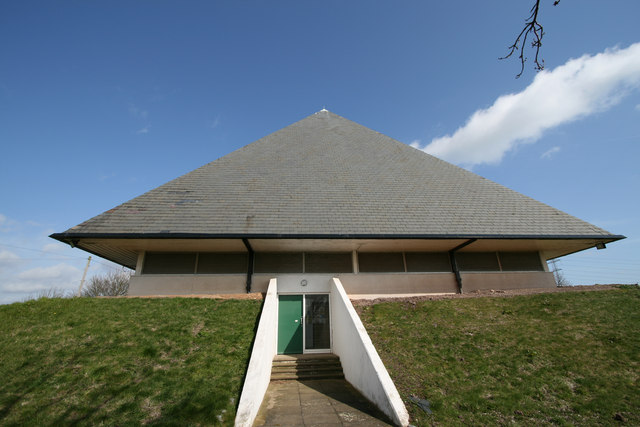
Ompton Pumping Station is a borehole site, opened in 1969.

Nottingham was granted city status in 1897 by Queen Victoria as part of her jubilee celebrations, and the Nottingham Corporation Waterworks was renamed the City of Nottingham Water Department in 1912.

In 1899, Nottingham co-operated with Derby, Leicester, Sheffield and Derbyshire County, to create the Derwent Valley Water Board, which was authorised by the Derwent Valley Water Act 1899 (62 & 63 Vict. c. cclxix). This allowed them to construct reservoirs in the Derwent Valley in Derbyshire. Howden Reservoir was the first to be completed, in 1912, and water from it was filtered, before being piped to the cities. Although water from this source became available in 1913, there were complaints, and it was not used until a filter works was constructed at Eastwood. The city began drawing water from the Derwent scheme in 1917, and this provided one quarter of Nottingham's water by 1918. Derwent Reservoir was completed in 1916, and Ladybower Reservoir was commissioned in 1945.

The Nottingham Corporation Act 1938 (1 & 2 Geo. 6. c. xcv) authorised the construction of two new pumping station, three new reservoirs, a water tower and trunk mains. The whole of the works was estimated to cost £400,000 and was scheduled for completion by 1948, but the project was interrupted by World War II. Between 1945 and 1969, with revised plans five further electrically-powered borehole stations were built at Rufford, completed in 1945, Lambley, built in 1957, Halam, operational by 1963, Markham Clinton, opened in 1965, and finally Ompton, which was finished in 1969. By 1969, 23 million imperial gallons (100 Ml) of water were supplied daily from boreholes and pumping stations abstracting water from the Bunter sandstone.

The steam engine at Burton Joyce borehole was replaced by an electric pump in 1928, but despite large increases in the costs of coal and labour, the other steam engines were retained until the 1960s, when there was a programme to fit electric pumps. The third engine at Basford was replaced by a submersible pump at the bottom of the well in 1961, and the other two engines were replaced in 1963. One of these engines was subsequently preserved at Wollaton Park Industrial Museum, maintained by the Arkwright Society. Electrification of Bestwood followed in 1966, Boughton in 1967 and finally Papplewick in 1969. Before the conversion was completed, the Minister of Public Buildings and Works notified the Water Department that he intended to use the powers of the Ancient Monuments Act 1931 to schedule Papplewick pumping station as an industrial monument, and this occurred in April 1969. A trust was established to take over the works, and were given a 99-year lease of the site just before responsibility for water supply passed to a Regional water authority in 1974.

In 1967 a new reservoir and treatment works was built at Church Wilne, extracting up to 6 million imperial gallons (27 Ml) per day from the River Derwent. In order to sustain such abstraction, a second reservoir was built at Carsington, into which water is pumped from the river during the winter months, while water is released into the river in the summer months, allowing it to be abstracted again at Church Wilne. Planning for Carsington Water began in the 1960s, although construction of the retaining dam did not start until 1979. In 1984, before filling of the reservoir began, there was a major structural failure of the dam, which had to be removed and rebuilt, delaying completion until 1992, when Queen Elizabeth formally opened it.

== Sewerage ==
Nottingham and Leen District Sewerage Act 1872
- Act of Parliament
- Parliament of the United Kingdom
- Long title: An Act for securing the Purification and preventing the Pollution of the Water of the Trent and Leen in and in the neighbourhood of the town of Nottingham; and for other purposes.
- Citation: 35 & 36 Vict. c. cv
- Territorial extent: United Kingdom

Dates
- Royal assent: 18 July 1872
- Commencement: 18 July 1872
- Repealed: 8 November 1995

Other legislation
- Repealed by: Statute Law (Repeals) Act 1995

Status: Repealed

Text of statute as originally enacted

When Tarbotton became Borough Engineer, the lower parts of the town were often affected by flooding of polluted water from the River Leen. This was a consequence of six parishes adjacent to the town discharging raw sewage into the river. The Nottingham and Leen District Sewerage Act 1872 (35 & 36 Vict. c. cv) enabled the Nottingham and Leen District Sewerage Board to be created. In addition to his other duties, Tarbotton became the Sewerage Board's engineer in 1872, and set about rectifying the situation. He oversaw the construction of sewers and sewage pumping stations, which carried the effluent to a sewage farm some 4 miles (6.4 km) downstream of Nottingham at Stoke Bardolph. Here it was treated, and the liquor discharged into the River Trent was relatively pure. The Nottingham Borough Extension Act 1877 (40 & 41 Vict. c. xxxi) incorporated the offending parishes into the town of Nottingham, and the responsibilities of the Sewerage Board were taken over by the corporation at the same time.

Initially the corporation leased 638 acres (258 ha) of agricultural land from Earl Manvers. A deed from 1878 states that John Elliot Burnside leased the farm to the Mayor, Alderman and Burgesses of the Borough of Nottingham for a period of 60 years, at an annual rent of £135, but the estate at Stoke Bardolph was subsequently purchased. The location was selected because it had good drainage, allowing the sewage to be spread over the land, where it seeped into the soil. Tarbotton was responsible for the construction of the sewage farm, and the first stage became operational on 17 June 1880. However, he did not see it completed, as he suffered a stroke while attending a meeting of the Sewage Farm Committee on 4 March 1887, and died two days later. Additional land adjacent to the original site was acquired, some of which was in the neighbouring parish of Bulcote. The farm produced milk from cattle kept on the land, and was also a centre for pedigree shire horses and pigs.

In 1936, the corporation embarked on a scheme to upgrade the main drainage and sewage disposal works. New sewers were constructed, and an additional pumping station was commissioned at Sneinton, to the east of the city centre. Work at Stoke Bardolph included new buildings providing preliminary treatment of the sewage before the effluent was spread over the land. Aeration units were added in 1960, allowing rotation of the land receiving digested sludge. The works is partially self-sufficient, using electricity generated from biogas produced from the sewage to power the plant. Historical records from the sewage farm dating for the years 1892 to 1975 were deposited in the Nottingham University Library in 1981. They comprise 114 large volumes, covering all aspects of the operation from shortly after it became operational until it was taken over in 1973 by the Severn Trent Water Authority.

== Privatisation ==
The City of Nottingham Water Department existed until 1974 when, under the terms of the Water Act 1973, responsibility for water supply, sewerage and sewage treatment were transferred to the Severn Trent Water Authority, one of ten regional water authorities established to manage water resources in England and Wales, which included land drainage and river quality. There were issues with the new structures, as a single authority responsible for river quality and sewage treatment was unlikely to prosecute itself for breaches in quality. It also became obvious that the water and sewage industry suffered from ageing infrastructure and chronic under-investment. The Conservative Party of the time saw privatisation as a means to solve the funding gap, and under the terms of the Water Act 1989, the water authority became Severn Trent Water, a water and sewerage company, with the river quality and land drainage functions passing to the National Rivers Authority, and subsequently the Environment Agency.

== See also ==
- Papplewick Pumping Station
- Bestwood Pumping Station
- Boughton Pumping Station

== Bibliography ==
- Beckett, John (1997). A Centenary History of Nottingham. Manchester University Press. ISBN 978-0-7190-4001-6.
- Beckett, John (2017). City Status in the British Isles 1830-2002. Routledge. ISBN 978-1-13825-212-7.
- Bell, Sean (2008). "Desk-based Assessment of Stoke Bardolph Sewage Treatment Works, Nottinghamshire". ARCUS for Severn Trent Water. Archived from the original on 22 February 2019.
- Binnie, G M (1981). Early Victorian Water Engineers. Thomas Telford. ISBN 978-0-7277-0128-2.
- Cross-Rudkin, Peter; Chrimes, Mike (2008). A Biographical Dictionary of Civil Engineers in Great Britain and Ireland: Vol 2: 1830 to 1890. Thomas Telford. ISBN 978-0-7277-3504-1.
- Jeyes, B F (2008). "History of Nottingham's Water Supply". Papplewick Pumping Station. Archived from the original on 26 October 2014.
- Jubilee (1930). "Short History of the Waterworks". Jubilee of Ownership 1880 - 1930. City of Nottingham Water Department. Archived from the original on 13 June 2007.
- McCann, Nick (2005). Papplewick Pumping Station. Heritage House Group. ISBN 978-0-85101-416-6.
- Ofwat (2006). "The Development of the Water Industry in England and Wales" (PDF). OFWAT. Archived from the original (PDF) on 4 June 2015.
- Papplewick (2001). "Nottingham Water Supply – history". Archived from the original on 9 August 2007.
- Porter, Elizabeth (1978). Water Management in England and Wales. Cambridge University Press. ISBN 978-0-521-21865-8.
- Skempton, Sir Alec; et al. (2002). A Biographical Dictionary of Civil Engineers in Great Britain and Ireland: Vol 1: 1500 to 1830. Thomas Telford. ISBN 978-0-7277-2939-2.
- Zadik, Megan; Brand, Ken (9 December 2013). "Belle View Reservoir". NG Spaces. Archived from the original on 19 June 2017.
