= Papplewick Hall =

Country house in Nottinghamshire, England

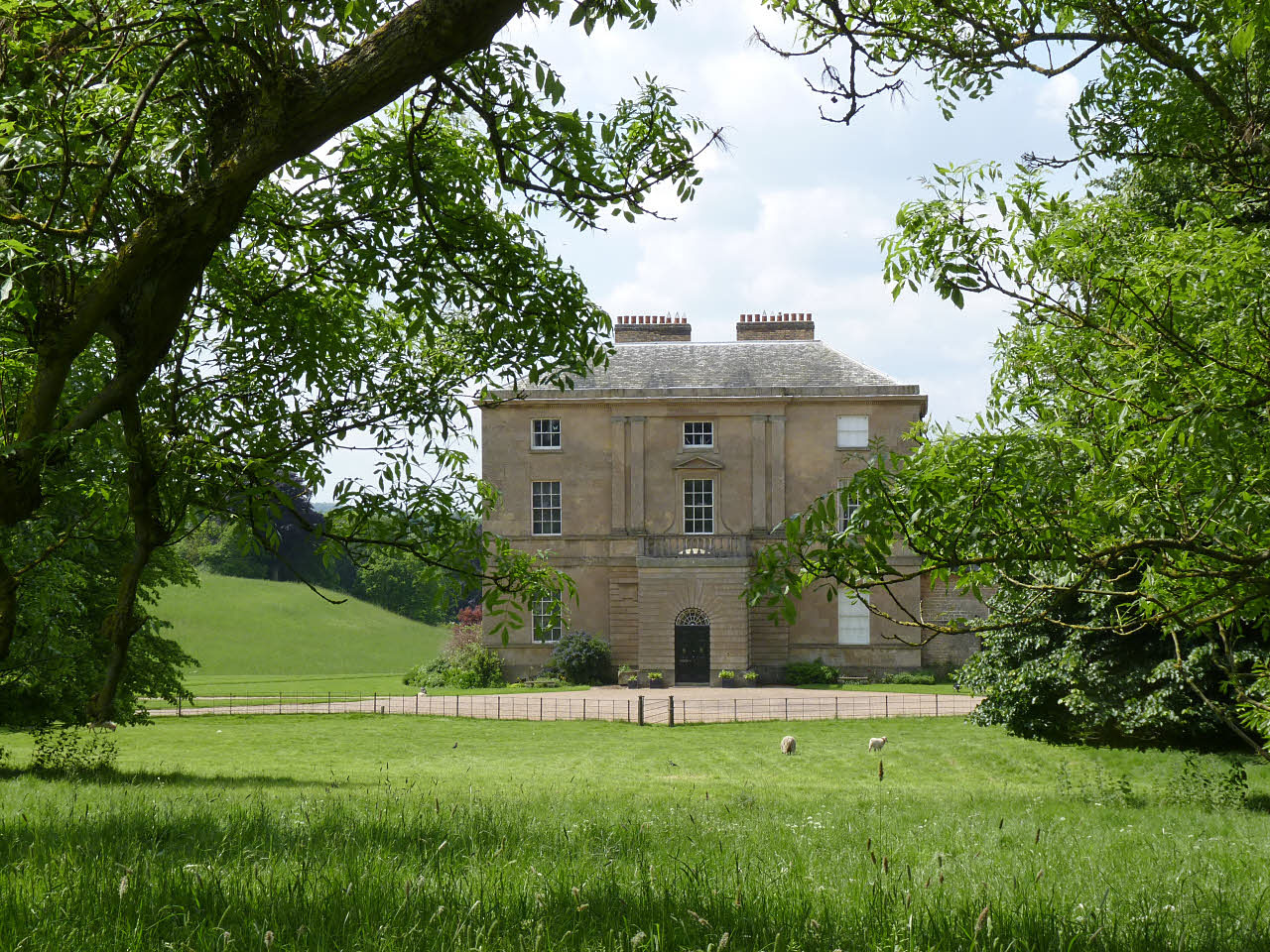
- A view from the front

- Location within Nottinghamshire

General information
- Coordinates: 53.060105°N 1.183468°W
- Opened: 1787
- Client: Hon. Frederick Montague

Design and construction
- Designations: Grade I listed building

Papplewick Hall is a Grade I listed English country house in Papplewick, Nottinghamshire.

== History ==
It was completed around 1787 for the Hon. Frederick Montagu, and is probably the work of William Lindley of Doncaster.

Frederick never married, and on his death in 1800 the Papplewick estate passed into the hands of his niece, Catherine Judith Fountayne, for her lifetime. Catherine lived at Papplewick until 1822. On her death the Estate went to Richard Fountayne Wilson of Melton-on-the-Hill. He gave it by Royal Licence to his 10-year-old son, Andrew, in 1826.

Andrew Montagu took charge of the 1,758-acre (711 ha) estate during 1840 and moved into Papplewick Hall from his home at Normanton, Rutland. He never married and on his death in 1895, the Papplewick Estate was left in trust, for his brother's youngest son, James Fountayne Montagu.

James inherited the Estate on his 25th birthday in December 1912, and he developed it as a horse breeding centre. However, the First World War intervened. After the war he ran up large debts. In April 1919, Alderman Albert Ball (father of World War I flying ace, Captain Albert Ball, VC), emerged as the purchaser of the Papplewick Estate for the hitherto undisclosed sum of £136,410 (equivalent to £6,089,761 in 2025). Subsequent sales divided the estate between the Hucknall Torkard Industrial Provident Society which purchased 1,058 acres in Papplewick and Linby, whilst Sir Charles Seely, 2nd Baronet took another 444 acres centred on Forest Farm.

The house and grounds are privately owned.

== See also ==
- Grade I listed buildings in Nottinghamshire
- Listed buildings in Papplewick
