= Frederick Montagu (MP, born 1733) =

British Whig MP

Frederick Montagu PC FRS

Member of Parliament for Higham Ferrers
- In office 1768-1790

Member of Parliament for Northampton
- In office 1759-1768

Personal details
- Born: July 1733
- Died: 30 July 1800 (aged 66–67) Papplewick, Nottinghamshire, England
- Party: Whig
- Parent: Charles Montagu (father)
- Education: Trinity College, Cambridge

Frederick Montagu PC FRS (July 1733 – 30 July 1800) was a British Whig MP.

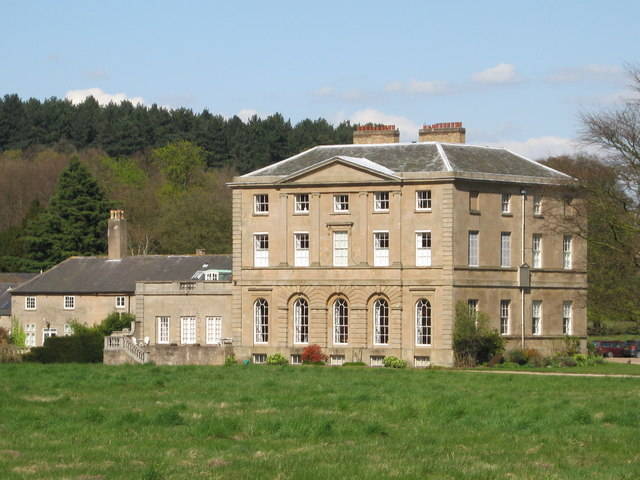
Papplewick Hall, Nottinghamshire

== Life ==
Frederick's father, Charles, was auditor-general of the Duchy of Cornwall, while Frederick was Prince of Wales; he was MP for Westminster in 1722, for St. Germans in 1734, for Camelford in 1741, and for Northampton in 1754, and died on 29 May 1759.

Frederick's mother, Ann Colladon, well known in society after her husband's death, was an intimate friend of Mary, dowager-countess of Gower (the widow of John Leveson-Gower, 1st Earl Gower), and of Mary Delany, in whose published 'Correspondence' she frequently figures as 'my Mrs Montague', in order to distinguish her from the better known Elizabeth Montagu.

Her London residence was in Hanover Square. She died on 31 May 1780.

Frederick was educated at Eton and Trinity College, Cambridge 8 February 1750. He seems to have won Paris's college declamation prize, and his oration was published at the request of the master and fellows as 'Oratio in laudes Baconi,' Cambridge, 1755, 4to. He graduated Master of Arts (MA) per lit. reg. in 1757.

At Cambridge, Montagu made the acquaintance of the poets Thomas Gray and William Mason, which he sedulously cultivated afterwards. To his influence, Mason owed his appointment to a canonry at York in 1762.

Admitted a barrister of Lincoln's Inn in 1757, Montagu became a bencher in 1782. He succeeded his father to the Papplewick estate in 1759 and to his seat as MP for Northampton from 1759 to 1767. He also represented Higham Ferrers as MP from 1768 to 1790.

In 1763, his cousin, George Montagu-Dunk, 2nd Earl of Halifax, pressed George Grenville to obtain a post for him in the board of trade, and he was subsequently 'a devoted adherent to the Cavendish and Rockingham interest'. In 1772, he moved in vain to abolish the fast of 30 January, the date of Charles I's execution; the fast was not abolished till 1859. In 1780, he was generally expected to succeed Fletcher Norton, 1st Baron Grantley as speaker of the House of Commons. He became a Lord of the Treasury in 1782 under Charles Watson-Wentworth, 2nd Marquess of Rockingham, and again in 1783 in William Cavendish-Bentinck, 3rd Duke of Portland's coalition ministry. In 1787, he was a member of the committee that prepared the articles of Warren Hastings's impeachment.

He was popular in society, and had literary tastes. Wraxall describes him as 'a man of distinguished probity'. On retiring from the House of Commons in 1790, he was made a privy councillor, and lived mainly at his house at Papplewick Hall, which he had rebuilt in 1787. He expressed approval of Burke's Reflections on the Revolution in France.

He was created Doctor of Civil Law (DCL) at Oxford on 3 July 1793.

He died unmarried at Papplewick on 30 July 1800. He is buried at the church of Saint James, Papplewick.

== Family ==
A sister, Ann, who died on 10 September 1786, was wife of John Fountayne, Dean of York, to whose grandson, Richard Fountayne Wilson, the estate of Papplewick passed, together with the name of Montagu.

== Notes ==
Attribution

This article incorporates text from a publication now in the public domain: Lee, Sidney (1894). "Montagu, Frederick". In Lee, Sidney (ed.). Dictionary of National Biography. Vol. 38. London: Smith, Elder & Co.

Parliament of Great Britain
Preceded by Richard Backwell; Charles Montagu	Member of Parliament for Northampton; 1759–1768; With: Richard Backwell (1759–1761); Spencer Compton (1761–1763); Lucy Knightley (1763–1768)	Succeeded by George Brydges Rodney; George Osborn
Preceded by John Yorke	Member of Parliament for Higham Ferrers; 1768–1790	Succeeded by Frederick Ponsonby, Viscount Duncannon
