= Papplewick =

Village and civil parish in Nottinghamshire, England

Coordinates: 53°03′15″N 01°10′57″W

- Village and civil parish
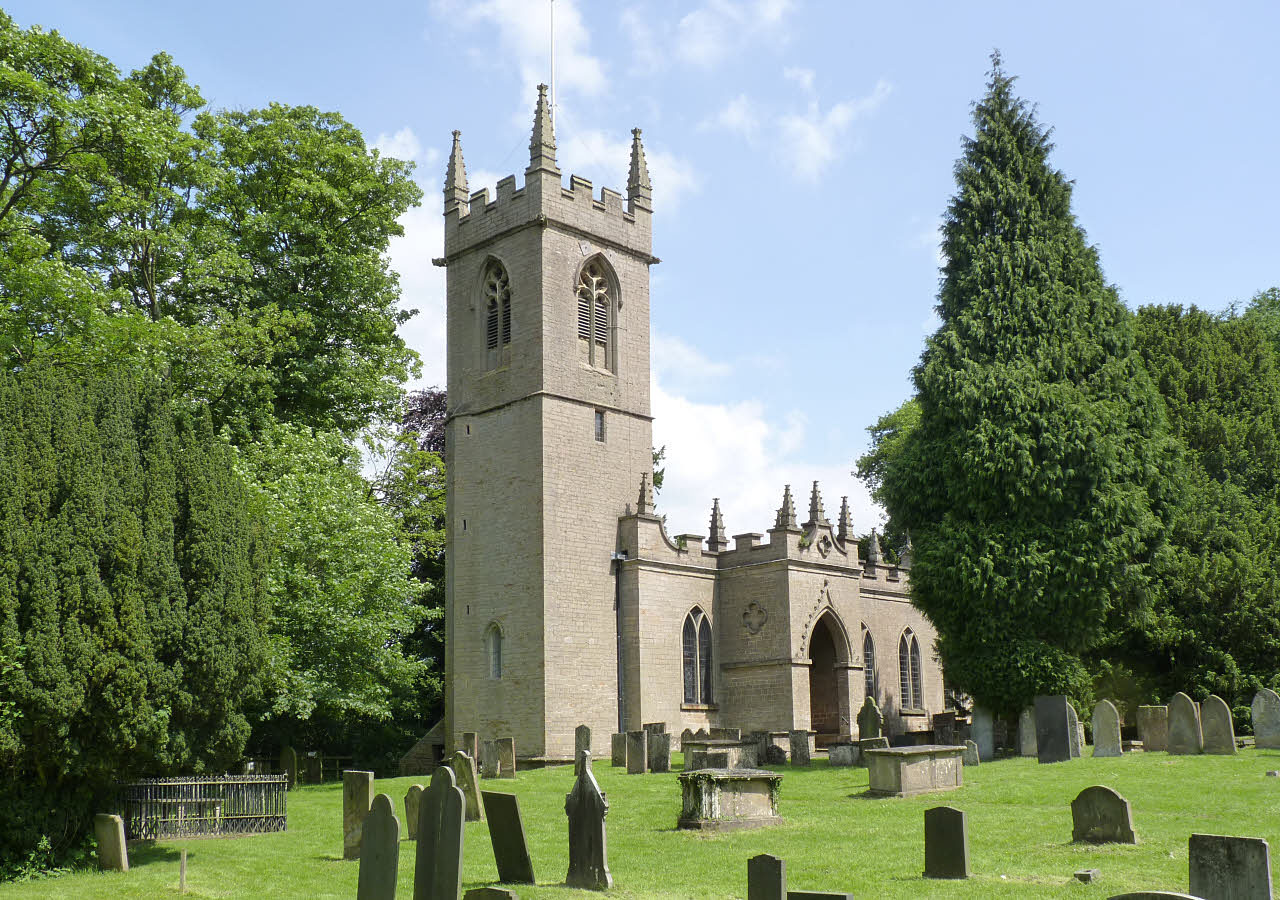
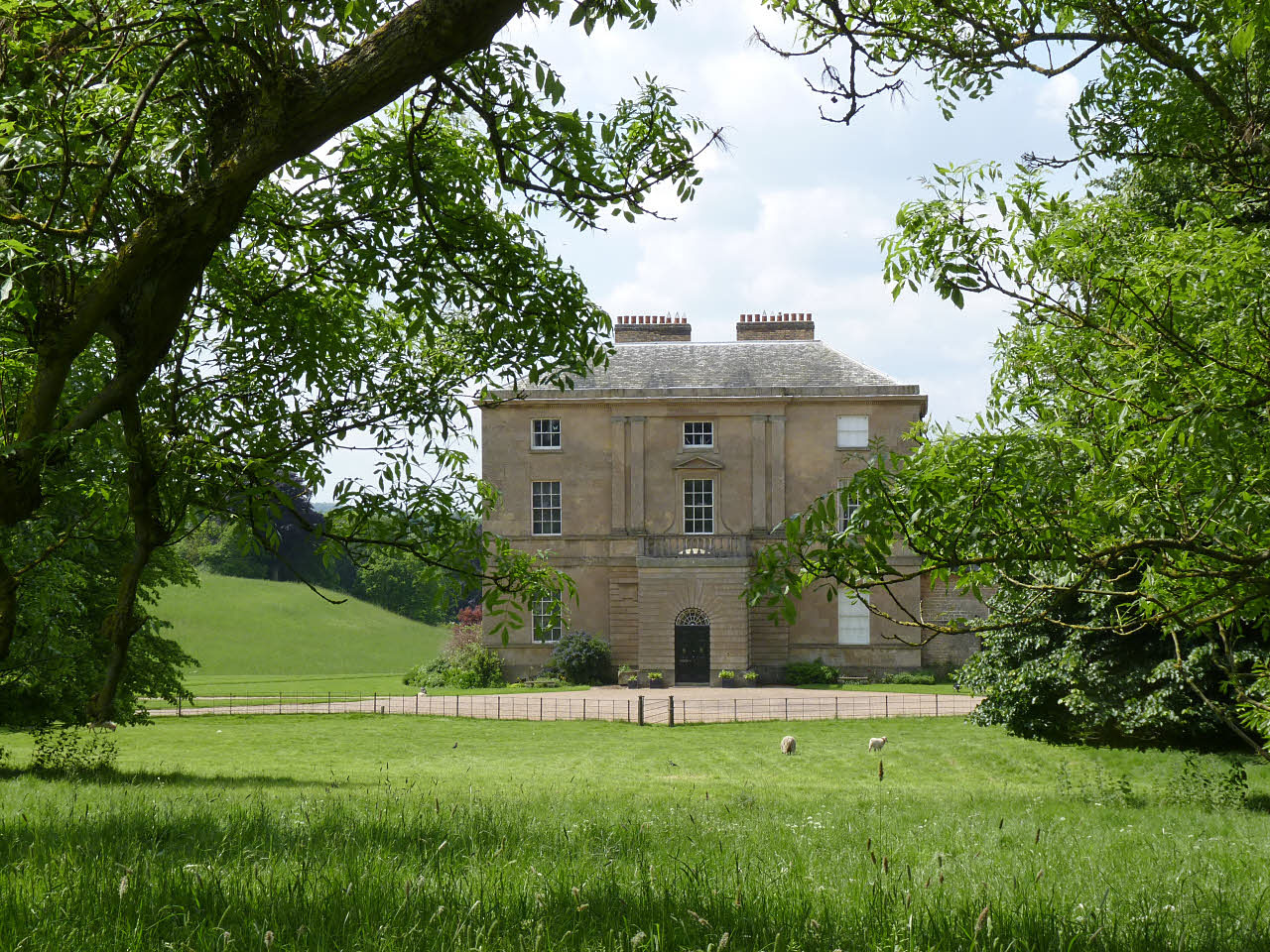
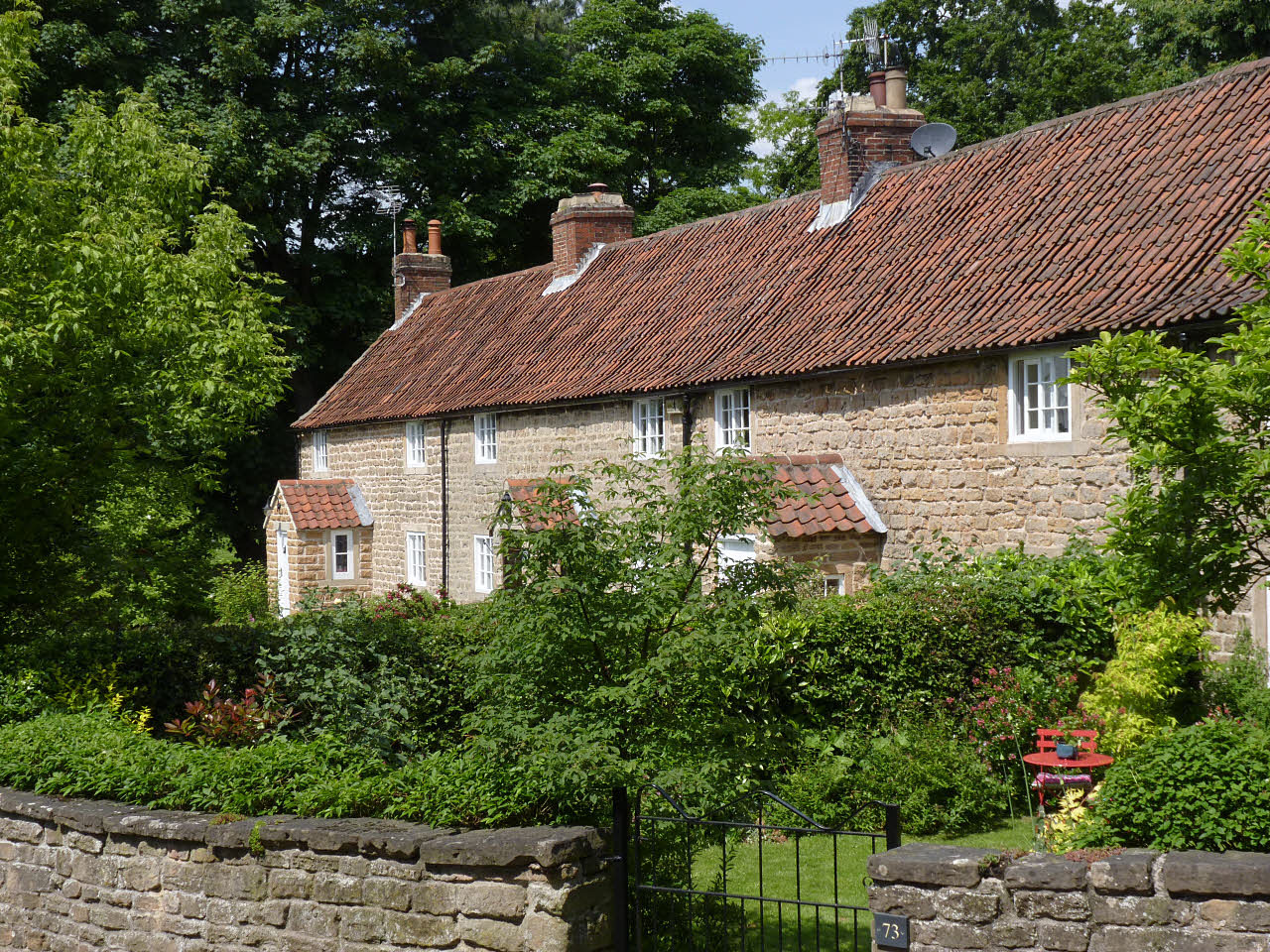
- St James Church Papplewick Hall Main Street

- Location within Nottinghamshire
- Interactive map of Papplewick
- Area: 2.89 sq mi (7.5 km^{2})
- Population: 651 (2021)
  - Density: 225/sq mi (87/km^{2})
- OS grid reference: SK 548510
  - London: 115 mi (185 km) SSE
- District: Borough of Gedling
- Shire county: Nottinghamshire
- Region: East Midlands
- Country: England
- Sovereign state: United Kingdom
- Post town: Nottingham
- Postcode district: NG15
- Dialling code: 0115
- Police: Nottinghamshire
- Fire: Nottinghamshire
- Ambulance: East Midlands
- UK Parliament: Sherwood
- Website: https://papplewick.org

Papplewick is a village and civil parish in Nottinghamshire, England, 7.5 miles (12.1 km) north of Nottingham and 6 miles (9.7 km) south of Mansfield. It had a population of 756 at the 2011 census (which included a rural unparished area south of and including Burntstump Hill), and 651 at the 2021 census. In the Middle Ages, the village marked the southern gateway to Sherwood Forest.

Papplewick has numerous community and social groups, a village hall, a pub, The Griffin's Head, and an ancient church. Tourist attractions in the parish include the village conservation area, 18th-century cottages and Papplewick Hall.

Papplewick Pumping Station is a working museum comprising steam-powered pumping engines, cooling pond and grounds in open agricultural land 1 mile (2 km) east of the village. Surrounding areas of woodland are accessible to the public by a network of footpaths.

A local legend dictates that the body of Alan-a-Dale, one of Robin Hood's men, was buried in Papplewick.

Papplewick is included in Nottinghamshire's Hidden Valleys district.

Papplewick Hall was built between 1781 and 1787 for the Hon. Frederick Montagu. The church of St James, in the grounds of the Hall, was built in 1795.

Papplewick and Linby Cricket Club play on Hall Lane behind Papplewick Hall.

From 1894 to 1974, the parish was part of Basford Rural District. It was then transferred to Gedling Borough. A small part of the parish had been transferred to Hucknall Urban District in 1935.

== See also ==
- Listed buildings in Papplewick
