= Ropewalk Pumping Station =

Pumping station in Nottingham, England

Ropewalk pumping station
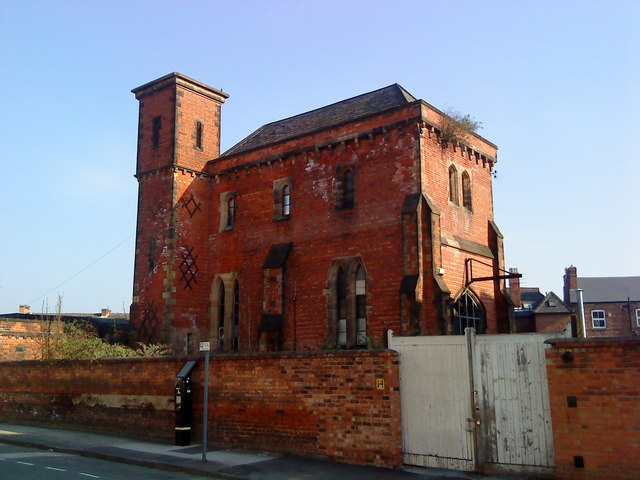
- Ropewalk pumping station

- Location within Nottinghamshire

General information
- Architectural style: Gothic revival
- Location: Ropewalk, Nottingham, Nottingham, England
- Coordinates: 52.955135°N 1.161332°W
- Completed: 1850

Design and construction
- Engineer: Thomas Hawksley

The Ropewalk pumping station was built on the Ropewalk in Nottingham in 1850. It is a Grade II listed building.

== History ==
It was built by the Nottingham Waterworks Company in 1850 along with a reservoir on Park Row in Nottingham. It used a 60 hp (45 kW) Cornish Beam engine to pump from two 240 ft (73 m) deep wells.

The Ropewalk pumping station fell into disuse around 1880 when it was found that the water which it was supplying was contaminated by Nottingham General Cemetery. It supplied 960,000 imperial gallons (4,400,000 L; 1,150,000 US gal) of water per day, and analysis in 1873 showed that it contained 31.5 grains (2.04 g) of solid effluent per gallon.

The building was used as a garage from 1930.
