= Marriott Ogle Tarbotton =

British engineer (1834–1887)

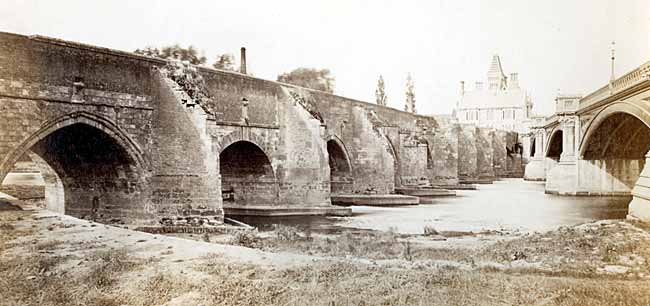
The construction of the new Trent Bridge alongside the old one in 1871

Marriott Ogle Tarbotton MICE, FGS, FRMS, was born in Leeds on 6 December 1834 and died in Nottingham on 6 March 1887. He was Borough Engineer for Nottingham from 1859.

== Career ==
Tarbotton was Borough Engineer at Wakefield from 1855 until he was appointed to the same position in Nottingham in 1859, a position he held until 1880 when he was succeeded by his assistant Arthur Brown.

He was awarded membership in the Institution of Civil Engineers in 1862.

He culverted the River Leen, a source of disease outbreaks. He also planned and oversaw the construction of the underground sewerage system for the city, the first outside London.

He was responsible for the design of Trent Bridge and Papplewick Pumping Station.

He was engineer to the Nottingham Gas Company.

In 1866 he provided a viaduct over the Midland Railway on Carrington Street, Nottingham.

He was a member of the British Meteorological Society and published detailed weather observations in Nottingham over 12 years.

== Personal life ==
Tarbotton was the eldest son of Samuel Tarbotton (1801 - 1850), Druggist and Drysalter and his wife Grace Ogle (1802-1884).

He married Emma Maria Stanfield (ca. 1832 - 1915) on 8 September 1857.

They had children:

- Minnie Grace Tarbotton 1861 - 1920 (married Micaiah John Muller Hill) first son of Revd. Samuel John Hill
- Lilian Mary Tarbotton 1863 - 1931 (married Samuel Charles Hill) second son of Revd. Samuel John Hill
- Harold Ogle Tarbotton 1869 - 1947

In 1851 he was living in Northallerton in the house of Harry J Hebert (Civil Engineer). In 1871 he was living at 30 Newstead Grove in Nottingham. By 1881 he was living in South Road, The Park, Nottingham.
