= Guest (surname) =

The surname Guest is derived from the Old English word giest, which in turn comes from the Old Norse word gestr, both of which mean 'guest' or 'stranger'. Spelling variations may include Gest, Geste, Gueste, Ghest, Geest, Geeste, Gist, Ghost, Jest. Other European counterparts to the name include the German and Dutch "Gast", Luxembourgish "Gaascht", Swedish "Gäst", Norwegian "Gjest", Serbian and Slovak "Gost", Czech "Host", etc.

Notable people with the surname include:

- Andrew Guest, 21st century American television writer
- Ann Hutchinson Guest (1918–2022), authority on dance notation
- Arthur Guest (1841–1898), British politician
- Barbara Guest (1920–2006), American poet and critic
- Bill Guest (1928–1985), Canadian television host
- Lady Charlotte Guest (1812–1895), Welsh historian and translator, wife of John Josiah Guest
- C. Z. Guest (1920–2003), American socialite and fashion icon
- Charles Guest (1900–1977), Royal Air Force officer
- Charlie Guest (born 1993), Scottish alpine skier
- Christopher Guest (born 1948), British-American comedian and actor
- Colin Guest (1937–2018), Australian cricketer
- Cornelia Guest (born 1963), American socialite, author
- Cornelia Guest, Baroness Wimborne (1847–1927), British philanthropist and landowner
- David Guest (communist) (1911–1938), British communist, mathematician and philosopher
- David Guest (field hockey) (born 1981), Australian field hockey player
- Douglas Guest (1916–1996), English organist, conductor, teacher, and composer
- Edgar Guest (1881–1959), American poet
- Edwin Guest (1800–1880), English antiquary
- Ernest Lucas Guest (1882–1972), Rhodesian statesman, lawyer and soldier
- Ernest Melville Charles Guest (1920–1943), Rhodesian-born World War II RAF pilot, son of Ernest Lucas Guest
- Freddie Guest (1875–1937), British politician
- Geraldine Guest (1913–2006), All-American Girls Professional Baseball League player
- Gladstone Guest (1917–1998), English footballer
- Glenda Guest (contemporary), Australian novelist
- Harry Guest (born 1938), British poet
- Henry Guest (1874–1957), British politician, son of Ivor Bertie Guest, 1st Baron Wimborne
- Ivor Guest (disambiguation)
- Jack Guest (1906–1972), Canadian Olympic rower
- Jane Mary Guest (c. 1762–1846), English composer and pianist
- Jean Haden-Guest, Lady Haden-Guest (1921–2017), American theatre director and television executive
- Jim Guest (born 1940), American aerospace engineer and politician; state representative
- Jo Guest (born 1972), English glamour model
- John Guest (disambiguation)
- Judith Guest (born 1936), American novelist and screenwriter
- Kim Mai Guest (born 1969), American voice actress
- Lance Guest (born 1960), American actor
- Lennie Guest (1908–1995), Australian rugby league footballer
- Mack Guest IV, American politician
- Matthew Guest (born 1983), Designer and Animator
- Melville Guest (born 1943), former British diplomat and cricketer
- Michael E. Guest (born 1957), American diplomat
- Michael Guest (politician) (born 1970), American attorney and politician
- Montague Guest (1839–1909), British politician; son of John Joshua Guest
- Nicholas Guest (born 1955), American actor
- Oscar Guest (1888–1958), British politician, son of Ivor Bertie Guest, 1st Baron Wimborne
- Paul Guest (poet), American poet and memoirist
- Paul Guest (rower) (1939–2026), Australian rower, family law barrister, Queen's Counsel and judge of the Family Court of Australia
- Raymond R. Guest (1907–1991), American businessman, race horse owner and polo player, son of Freddie Guest
- Richard Guest (born 1967), English artist and short story author
- Rob Guest (1950–2008), British-born New Zealand-Australian actor and singer
- Robert Guest, American journalist
- Stephen Guest, New Zealand-British barrister, solicitor and professor
- Thomas B. Guest (1816–1884), Canadian politician
- Thomas Douglas Guest (1781–1845), British artist
- Tim Guest (1975–2009), English author and journalist
- Tom Guest (born 1984), English rugby union player
- Val Guest (1911–2006), British film director
- William Guest (disambiguation)

== See also ==
- Guest (disambiguation)
- Gest (surname)
