= Guest =

A guest is person who is given hospitality.

Guest or The Guest may refer to:

== Film and television ==
=== Film ===
- The Guest (2014 American film), a thriller film directed by Adam Wingard
- The Guest (2014 Chilean film), a drama film directed by Mauricio López Fernández
- The Guest (2017 film), a Nigerian film
- The Guest (2018 film), an Italian film
- Guest (2019 film), a Burmese film
- Guest (2020 film), a British short film directed by Finn Callan
- The Guest: Aleppo to Istanbul, a 2017 Turkish-Jordanian film starring Saba Mubarak

=== Television ===
- The Guest (2018 TV series), a South Korean supernatural television series
- The Guest (2025 TV series), a British television drama miniseries

== Astronomy ==
- Guest (lunar crater), a lunar impact crater
- Guest (Plutonian crater)
- 4325 Guest, a main-belt asteroid

== Places ==
- Guest, Alabama, United States, an unincorporated community
- Guest Island in the Ross Sea off Antarctica; part of the Ross Dependency claimed by New Zealand
- Guest Peninsula, in the northwest part of Marie Byrd Land, Antarctica
- Guest River, Virginia, United States

== Other uses ==
- Guest (surname), people with the surname Guest
- USS Guest (DD-472), a United States Navy World War II destroyer
- "The Guest" (short story), a 1957 short story by Albert Camus
- The Guest (novel), a 2023 novel by Emma Cline
- Guest (album), a 1994 album by Critters Buggin
- The Guest (album), a 2002 album by Phantom Planet

== See also ==
- Guest appearance, guest actor, guest star, etc.
- Guest beer, 1989 legislation in the British Parliament concerning the sale of beer
- Guest comic, issue of a comic strip that is created by a different person (or people) than usual
- Guest host (or guest presenter), host, usually of a talk show, that substitutes for the regular host
- Guest operating system, operating system installed on a virtual machine
- Guest ranch (or dude ranch), type of ranch oriented towards visitors or tourism
- Guest star (astronomy), ancient Chinese astronomical term for novae and supernovae
- Guest statute, statute in tort law
- Guest worker, person who works in a country other than the one of which they are a citizen
- The Guests (disambiguation)
- Baron Haden-Guest
