= Ernest Guest =

Ernest Guest may refer to:

- Ernest Lucas Guest (1882–1972), Rhodesian politician, lawyer and soldier
- Ernest Melville Charles Guest (1920–43), Rhodesian-born Royal Air Force pilot
