= Agnes Mellers =

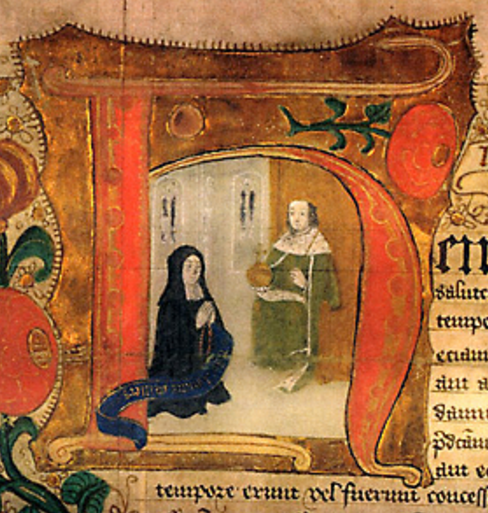
- from the school founding document
- Died: 1513/4
- Known for: founding Nottingham High School
- Spouse: Richard Mellers
- Children: 3

Agnes Mellers ( – 1513/4) was a benefactor and the co-founder of Nottingham High School.

== Life ==
Mellers' date of birth is unknown. In the 1480s she is mentioned as married. She came to notice when her husband Richard Mellers died in 1507. He left substantial bequests to her, their three children and many good causes. He had manufactured bells and he had been the Mayor of Nottingham twice.

Agnes set out to found a school in Nottingham and she got support from Sir Thomas Lovell. A document was drawn up and it received the agreement of Henry VIII in 1513. This authority and the Mellers' money created a school for boys in Nottingham. The money came from Agnes, her two elder sons, the mayor and over eighty others. This is the first clear evidence of the foundation of what today is Nottingham High School. The school opened on 2 February 1513.

Agnes' will, which she had written on 10 June 1513, was proved on 12 May 1514 so she must have died some time between those dates.

== Legacy ==
Agnes' will left the income from several properties to fund her school. There is a primary school now (2017) that is named after Mellers and this school has a Founder's Day. Agnes' eldest son was Mayor of Nottingham and her second son was mayor three times.
