= The Guests =

The Guests may refer to:

- Ushpizin, a 2004 Israeli film
- "The Guests" (The Outer Limits), a 1964 episode of The Outer Limits
- "The Guests", a song by Leonard Cohen from his 1979 album Recent Songs

== See also ==
- Guest (disambiguation)
