= Graham Harding (cricketer) =

English cricketer

Personal information
- Full name: Graham David Harding
- Born: 19 October 1966 (age 60); Oldham, Lancashire, England
- Batting: Right-handed
- Bowling: Right-arm off break

Career statistics
Competition	List A
Matches	2
Runs scored	3
Batting average	3.00
100s/50s	–/–
Top score	3
Balls bowled	90
Wickets	1
Bowling average	73.00
5 wickets in innings	–
10 wickets in match	–
Best bowling	1/54
Catches/stumpings	–/–
- Source: Cricinfo, 1 September 2019

Graham David Harding (born 19 October 1966) is an English former cricketer.

Harding was born at Oldham. He was educated at Nottingham High School, before going up to Durham University, where he was awarded a palatinate for his cricketing activities. While studying at Durham, Harding was selected in the British Universities squad for the 1988 Benson & Hedges Cup, making two List A one-day appearances in the competition against Gloucestershire at Bristol, and Hampshire at Fenner's. He scored 3 runs in his two matches, as well as taking a single wicket.
