= David Haywood =

English cricketer (born 1945)

Personal information
- Full name: David Charles Haywood
- Born: 20 May 1945 (age 81); Hucknall, Nottinghamshire, England
- Batting: Left-handed
- Bowling: Leg break

Domestic team information
- Years: Team
- 1968: Cambridge University

Career statistics
Competition	First-class
Matches	9
Runs scored	284
Batting average	18.93
100s/50s	–/1
Top score	62
Catches/stumpings	5/–
- Source: Cricinfo, 12 January 2022

David Charles Haywood (born 20 March 1945) is an English former first-class cricketer.

Haywood was born in March 1945 at Hucknall, Nottinghamshire. He was educated at Nottingham High School, before going up to Jesus College, Cambridge. While studying at Cambridge, he played first-class cricket for Cambridge University Cricket Club in 1968, making nine appearances. Playing as a middle order batsman in the Cambridge team, he scored 284 runs at an average of 18.93, making one half century score of 62. Haywood was also associated with Nottinghamshire, appearing for their second eleven on a handful of occasions between 1962 and 1967, but was unable to force his way into their first eleven. In addition to playing cricket at Cambridge, Haywood also played football for Cambridge University A.F.C., for which he gained a blue.
