= Roderic Wood =

British judge

The Honourable Mr Justice Wood
- Royal coat of arms of the United Kingdom

Justice of the High Court
- Incumbent
- Assumed office 2004

Personal details
- Born: 8 March 1951 (age 75)
- Education: Lincoln College, Oxford

Sir Roderic Lionel James Wood (born 8 March 1951), styled The Hon. Mr Justice Wood, is a judge of the High Court of England and Wales.

He was educated at Nottingham High School and Lincoln College, Oxford.

He was called to the bar at Middle Temple in 1974. He was made a QC in 1993, recorder from 1997 to 2002, and judge of the High Court of Justice (Family Division) since 2004. The Honourable Sir Roderic Wood retires from the High Court (Family Division) with effect from 5 October 2016.
