= Michael Watts (journalist) =

British journalist and broadcaster (1938–2018)

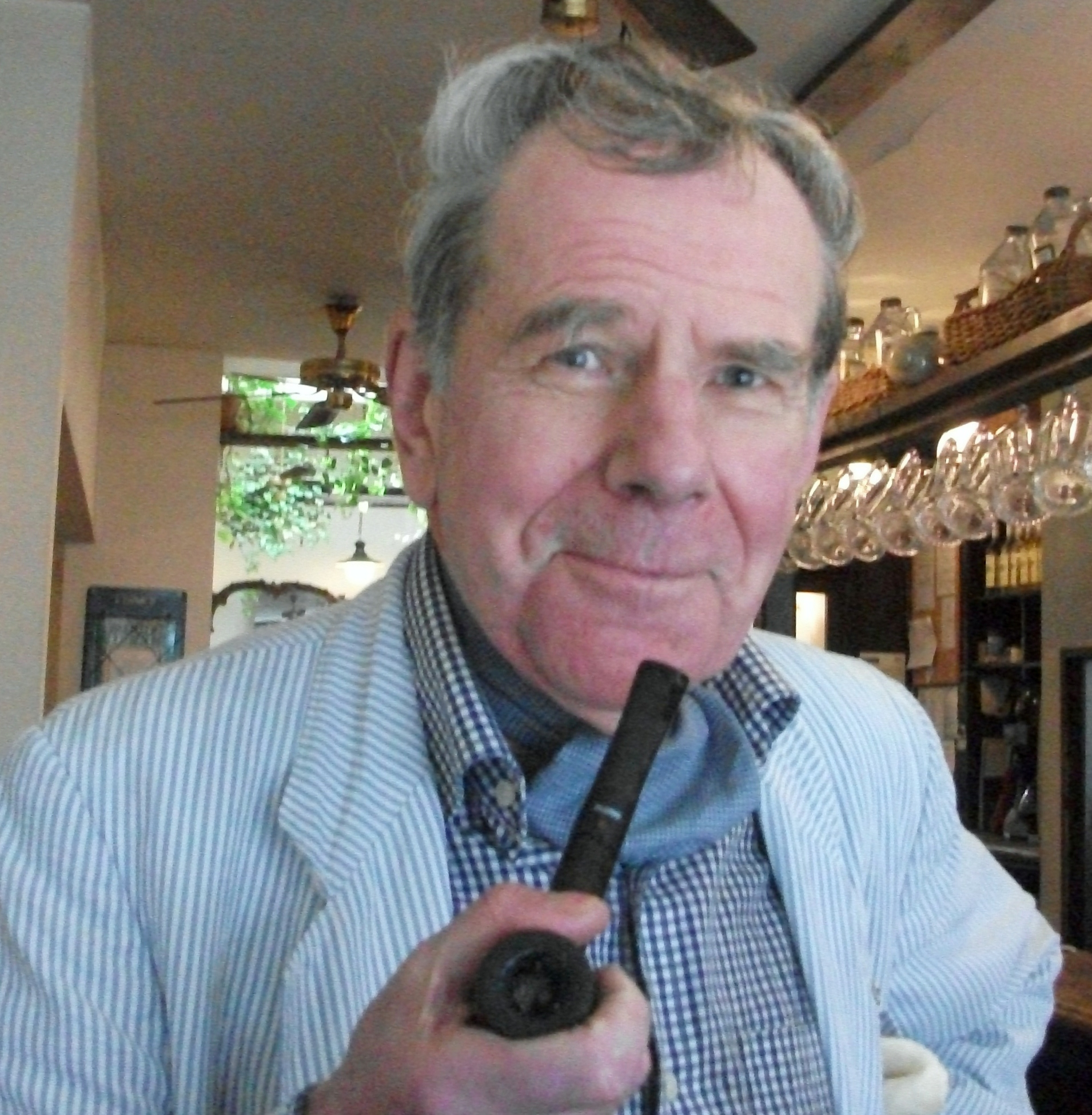
- Born: 18 October 1938; Nottinghamshire
- Died: 5 March 2018 (aged 79)
- Education: Nottingham High School
- Occupation: Journalist
- Years active: 1955 – 2018

Michael Watts (18 October 1938 – 5 March 2018) was a British journalist and broadcaster best known for his "Inspector Watts" column in the Sunday Express and other publications, which ran for over 35 years.

== Journalism career ==
Watts, born in Nottinghamshire and educated at Nottingham High School, began in journalism at age 16 as a reporter on the Nottingham Evening News. After four years there, he became London editor of The Viewer television magazine for a year, before joining the Sunday Express in 1960. There, he was variously gossip column editor, deputy news editor, and deputy editor in Manchester, and started the paper's Town Talk diary.

In 1969 he began The World of Michael Watts, a consumer column laced with social comment and humour. This concluded with the Great Corny Joke Contest, offering a cash prize of a "Crisp Oncer" - at £1 "the meanest prize in Fleet Street", and one which became relatively meaner as the years passed. In the 1980s, as the pound coin was replacing the pound note, Watts bought several hundreds of the latter from a bank so that the Crisp Oncer prize could continue. In carrying out investigations and taking up readers' battles with companies and bureaucracy, Michael Watts became known as "Inspector Watts" - and the column continued for 22 years, until he left the Sunday Express.

However, he started the column again in the relaunched London Evening News and, the following year, in Saga magazine. Then in 1989 the Sunday Express asked Watts to bring it back to them, which until 1991 he did.

His column and broadcasts were often commented upon by other publications, and in addition to continuing in Saga, the column also ran for five years in the Westminster Review, and from 2002 to 2005 in Active Life magazine (still handing out Crisp Oncers).

Watts freelanced in later life. He died on 5 March 2018.

== Broadcasting ==
Watts's radio work for BBC Radio 4 included twice-weekly consumer spots on Up To The Hour, and presenting The Weekly World and News Stand. Plus much for LBC.

== Awards ==
The Michael Watts column twice won the Consumer Writers' Award, in 1978 and 1986.

== Published works ==
Author of I Say! I Say! Great Britain’s Best Corny Jokes and the Debatable Wit and Wisdom of Michael Watts, published by Sidgwick & Jackson, 1971 (ISBN 0 283 978066).
