= Thomas Lovell =

English soldier and politician

Sir Thomas Lovell KG
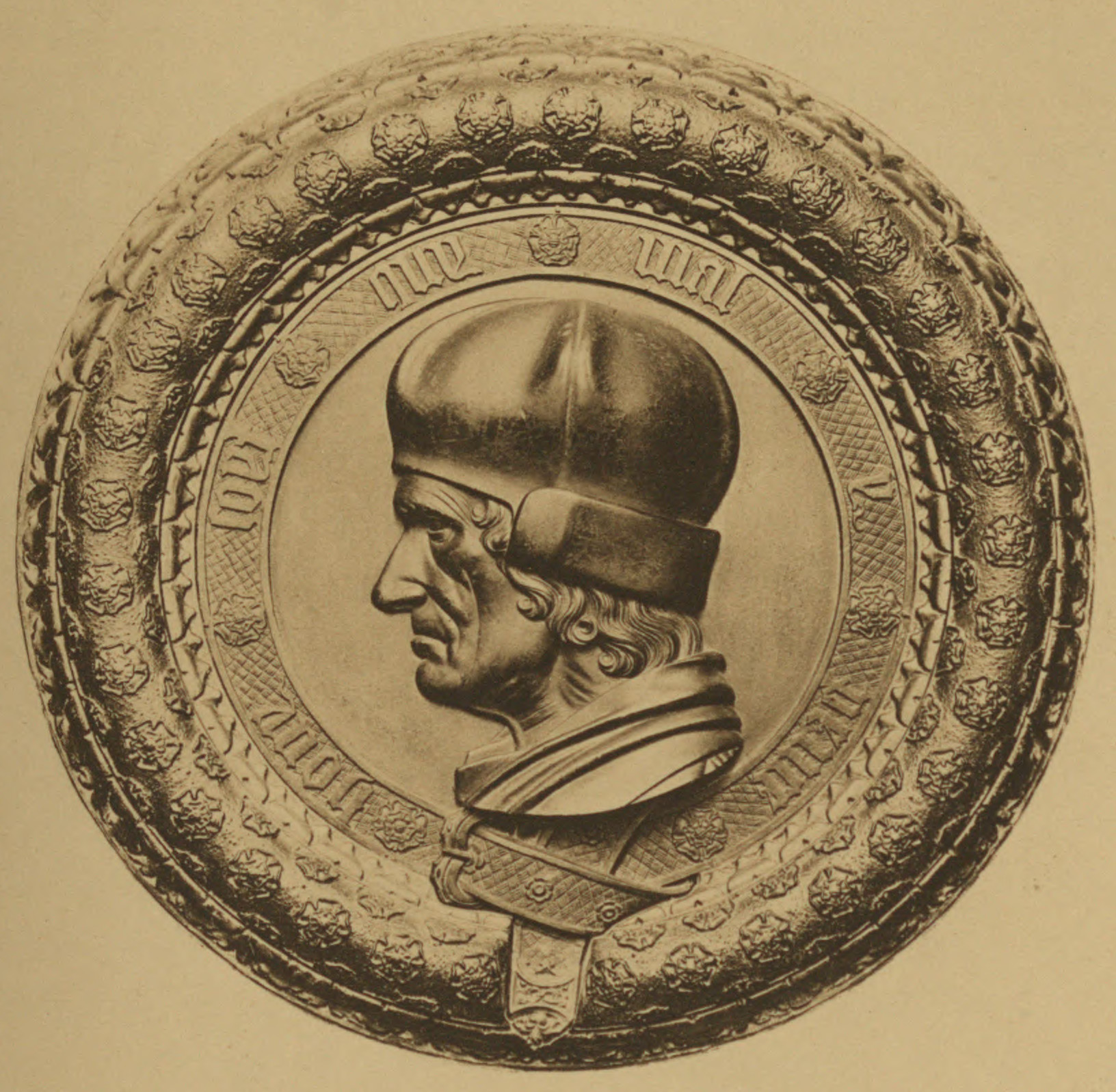
- Bronze medallion of Sir Thomas Lovell in Henry VII Chapel, Westminster Abbey

Chancellor of the Exchequer of England
- In office 1485–1524
- Monarchs: Henry VII, Henry VIII
- Preceded by: William Catesby
- Succeeded by: The Lord Berners

Speaker of the House of Commons
- In office 1485–1488
- Preceded by: William Catesby
- Succeeded by: Sir John Mordaunt

Personal details
- Died: 1524

Sir Thomas Lovell, KG (died 1524) was an English soldier and administrator, Speaker of the House of Commons, Secretary to the Treasury and Chancellor of the Exchequer.

== Early life ==
He was fifth son of Sir Thomas Lovell of Barton Bendish in Norfolk, by Anne, daughter of Robert Toppe, alderman of Norwich; his family was Lancastrian in politics. Thomas Lovell seems to have been entered at Lincoln's Inn.

He adhered to Henry Tudor, Earl of Richmond, and was attainted in the first parliament of Richard III. He returned with Henry and fought at the battle of Bosworth. His attainder was reversed in Henry VII's first parliament.

== Under Henry VII ==
On 12 October 1485 he was created Chancellor of the Exchequer for life; on 27 October he became esquire of the body to Henry VII, with a pension, and he was advanced to be knight the body to the King before August 1487. He was also treasurer of the King's and Queen's chambers.

In the parliament summoned for 7 November 1485 Lovell was chosen for Northamptonshire, and on 8 November 1485 he was elected speaker. He headed the commons on 10 December 1485, when they requested the king to marry Elizabeth of York, to whom he subsequently lent £500 on the security of her plate. On 3 July 1486 he was one of the commission to treat with the Scots. He probably continued to sit in parliament (such as for Middlesex in 1491–92 and for Norfolk in 1495), though it is only certain that he was elected to that summoned for 16 January 1497. Sir John Mordaunt was chosen speaker in 1488.

In 1487 Lovell sided with King Henry against Lambert Simnel, and he and his brothers fought at the battle of Stoke, where he was knighted (9 June). On 11 March 1489 he became constable of Nottingham Castle.

The services rendered by Lovell to Henry VII included an active participation in the king's policy of extortions: numerous bonds which were made to Lovell, as well as to Richard Empson and Edmund Dudley, were cancelled early in the reign of Henry VIII. In November 1494 he was present at the tournaments celebrating the creation of Prince Henry as Duke of York, and in 1500 he accompanied the king at his meeting with the Archduke Philip near Calais. In 1502 he became treasurer of the household and president of the council. In 1503 he was made Knight of the Garter. About 1504 he appears to have been high steward of the universities of Oxford and Cambridge. He acted as an executor for Cecily, Duchess of York (died 1494), Lady Margaret, Countess of Richmond, Henry VII, Sir Thomas Brandon, John de Vere, 13th Earl of Oxford, and Sir Robert Sheffield.

== Under Henry VIII ==
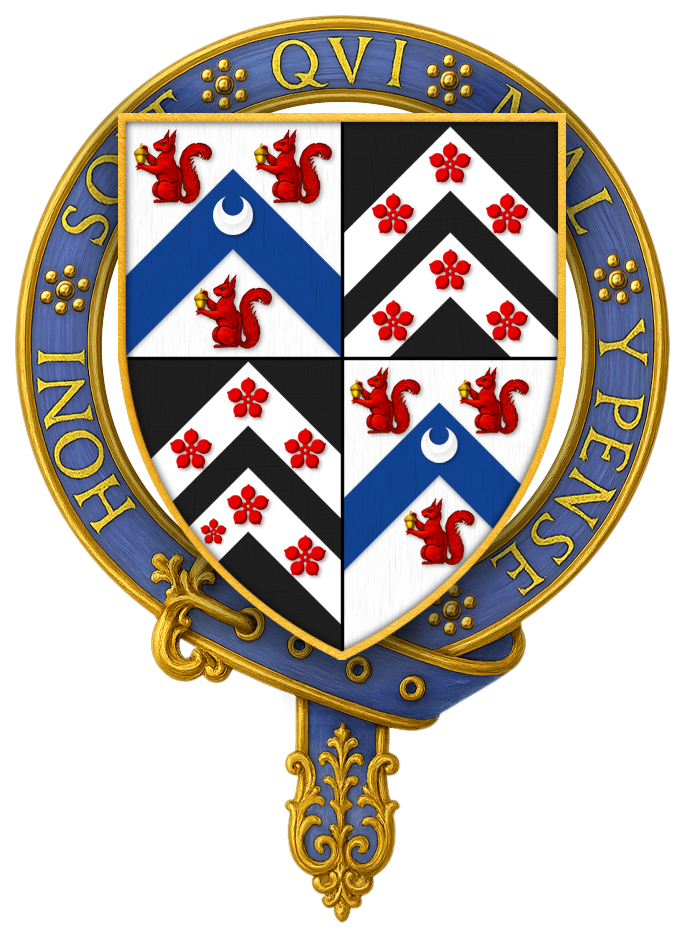
Coat of arms of Sir Thomas Lovell.

Henry VIII continued to employ Lovell. He was reappointed chancellor of the exchequer, and at Michaelmas 1512 was appointed Constable of the Tower of London. From 14 June 1513 he served as Master of the Wards. He was steward and marshal of the household. On 3 September 1513 he was commissioned by Catherine of Aragon to levy men in the Midlands for service against the Scots, and on 12 May 1514 either he or his nephew Thomas, who had been knighted at Tournai in 1513, landed at Calais with a hundred men, and was shortly afterwards joined by three hundred more.

The rise of Thomas Wolsey's power seems to have affected his position. Ambassador Sebastiano Giustiniani wrote on 17 July 1516 that Lovell had withdrawn himself from public affairs. On Ascension day 1516 Margaret, queen-dowager of Scotland visited him at Elsyng Palace, near Enfield, in Middlesex, a house he had inherited from his brother-in-law, Edmund de Ros, 10th Baron de Ros, in 1508. In 1520 he travelled to France with the other Garter Knights to take part in the meeting between Henry VIII and Francis I of France now known as the Field of the Cloth of Gold.

On 14 May 1523 he was reported to be very ill, and he died at Elsing on 25 May 1524. He was buried in a chantry chapel he had built at Holywell Priory, Shoreditch, a religious house of which he was regarded as a second founder. His funeral was very magnificent. His portrait was formerly in a stained-glass window in Malvern Priory.

== Family ==
His eldest brother, Gregory, inherited Barton Bendish, was knighted at the battle of Stoke in 1487, and was, by Margaret, sister of Sir William Brandon, standard-bearer to Henry at Bosworth Field, father of Sir Thomas Lovell of Barton Bendish and of Sir Francis Lovell (died 20 Jan 1552), who became adopted son and heir to his uncle. Another brother, Sir Robert Lovell (died 1520?), was made a knight-banneret at Blackheath in 1497. Margaret Brandon Lovell later married Hugh Manning.

Thomas Lovell married, first, Eleanor, daughter of Jeffrey Ratcliffe; and, secondly, Isabel, sister of Edmund de Ros, 10th Baron de Ros, of Hamlake, a widow, but left no issue.

== Legacy ==
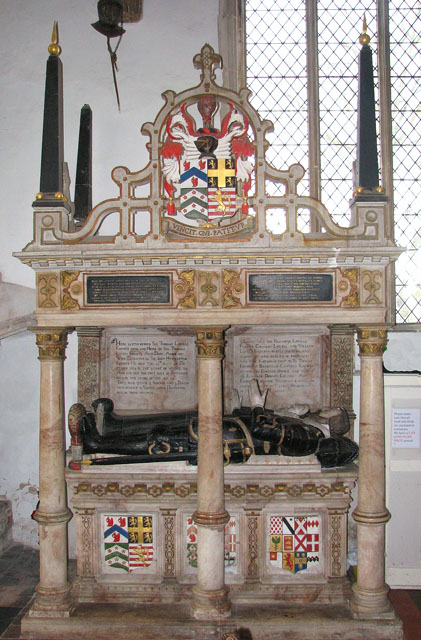
The tomb of Sir Thomas Lovell (his great nephew) in the church of Ss Peter and Paul, East Harling

By the numerous grants which he had from Henry VIII he died very rich. Lovell contributed towards the building of Caius College, Cambridge, and built a gateway for Lincoln's Inn. He also built a manor-house at Harling in Norfolk. The greater part of his estates passed to his nephew Francis, whom he calls in his will his cousin. Francis was succeeded by his son, Sir Thomas Lovell (died 1567), and had another son, Gregory Lovell (1522–1597), who was cofferer to the household, and received a lease of Merton Abbey, Surrey, from Elizabeth I in 1587. Lovell had also worked with Lady Agnes Mellers who had become a rich widow in 1507 and he assisted in her wish to found what would become Nottingham High School.

== Notes ==
Political offices
Preceded by William Catesby	Speaker of the House of Commons; 1485–1488	Succeeded by Sir John Mordaunt
Preceded by William Catesby	Chancellor of the Exchequer of England; 1485–1524	Succeeded by John Bourchier
