= Mike Groves =

New Zealand cricketer (born 1943)

Personal information
- Full name: Michael Godfrey Melvin Groves
- Born: 14 January 1943 (age 83); Taihape, Manawatu, New Zealand
- Batting: Right-handed
- Bowling: Right-arm fast-medium
- Role: Batsman
- Relatives: Henry Groves (father)

Domestic team information
- Years: Team
- 1960/61: Western Province
- 1963–1966: Oxford University
- 1965: Somerset
- FC debut: 21 January 1961 Western Province v Border
- Last FC: 4 June 1968 Free Foresters v Oxford University

Career statistics
Competition	First-class
Matches	55
Runs scored	2,541
Batting average	29.20
100s/50s	0/20
Top score	86
Balls bowled	642
Wickets	7
Bowling average	53.42
5 wickets in innings	0
10 wickets in match	0
Best bowling	3/33
Catches/stumpings	33/–
- Source: CricInfo, 11 June 2011

Michael Godfrey Melvin Groves (born 14 January 1943) is a former cricketer who played first-class cricket for Western Province, Oxford University, Somerset County Cricket Club, Marylebone Cricket Club (MCC) and the Free Foresters between 1961 and 1968. He was born at Taihape, Manawatu, New Zealand.

== Cricket career ==
The son of Henry Basil Melvin Groves, an Englishman whose single first-class cricket appearance came in India, Mike Groves was born in New Zealand but brought up in South Africa, where he was educated at Diocesan College, Cape Town. Usually a right-handed middle-order batsman and irregular right-arm medium-pace bowler, he played a single match as an 18-year-old in 1960/61 for Western Province as an opening batsman, scoring 5 and 45. He then came to England and played occasional amateur first-class matches in 1962 before going to Oxford University in autumn 1962 as an undergraduate at St Edmund Hall.

Over the next four cricket seasons, Groves played regularly for Oxford University's first eleven cricket team, but in 1963, despite finishing fourth in the university's batting averages with 485 runs at an average of 26.94 runs per innings, he was left out of the team for the University Match and did not win a Blue. His highest score in the season was an unbeaten 74 in the match against Northamptonshire. In 1964, he failed to match either the aggregate or the average, and his only score of 50 or more for the season was 61, but he retained his place through the Oxford season and was awarded a Blue, scoring eight and 10 not out and taking a single wicket, that of Richard Hutton, in the match.

Groves played his single full season of first-class cricket in 1965 and had his best year, with 1048 runs at an average of 29.11. He topped the Oxford batting averages with 743 runs at an average of 32.30 and made 69 and 81, his highest score for the university, in the match against Sussex which came immediately before the University Match. In the University Match itself, Groves top-scored for Oxford with 45 in the first innings, but he and fellow batsman Melville Guest were barracked by the crowd for slow scoring, with 15 consecutive maiden overs bowled by the two Cambridge spinners. The slow scoring was uncharacteristic, though Wisden noted that, in an out-of-form batting side and on damp pitches, Groves had not been able in 1965 to bat with the freedom he'd exhibited in previous seasons. After the university term was over, he joined Somerset, and though he began in the second team, for the whole of August he played for the first team, and while there he compiled the highest score of his first-class career, 86, in the match against Derbyshire at Glastonbury.

Groves returned for a fourth season at Oxford in 1966 but played only four matches because of examination demands. One of those, however, was his third University Match, and after five consecutive drawn games in this fixture the 1966 match was won by an innings by Oxford, with Groves' unbeaten 80 in 98 minutes on the first day one of the batting highlights, enabling Oxford to declare and give Cambridge an awkward half hour's batting at the end of the day. After the game, Groves again joined Somerset, but this time he played only a handful of second eleven matches and did not feature in the first team, which was having one of its most successful seasons.

That was virtually the end of Groves' cricket career, but he appeared over the next 14 seasons in occasional games for either the Free Foresters or the Marylebone Cricket Club (MCC), and in 1967 and 1968 a couple of those games were rated as first-class fixtures: subsequent matches he played in were not first-class. At the end of the 1968 season, with Somerset looking for a new captain to replace Roy Kerslake, there was a move to co-opt Groves to the post, but it did not happen.
