= Anthony Palfreman =

English cricketer and cricket administrator

Personal information
- Full name: Anthony Brian Palfreman
- Born: 27 August 1946 (age 80); Ravenshead, Nottinghamshire, England
- Batting: Right-handed
- Bowling: Right-arm fast-medium

Domestic team information
- Years: Team
- 1966–1968: Cambridge University

Career statistics
Competition	First-class
Matches	16
Runs scored	432
Batting average	15.42
100s/50s	–/2
Top score	67
Balls bowled	2,056
Wickets	31
Bowling average	37.35
5 wickets in innings	1
10 wickets in match	–
Best bowling	5/63
Catches/stumpings	11/–
- Source: Cricinfo, 24 September 2020

Anthony Brian Palfreman (born 27 August 1946) is an English former first-class cricketer and cricket administrator.

Palfreman was born in the village of Ravenshead in Nottinghamshire. He was educated at Nottingham High School, before going up to Emmanuel College, Cambridge. While studying at Cambridge, Palfreman played first-class cricket as an all-rounder for Cambridge University in 1966–68, making sixteen appearances. As a batsman he scored 432 runs at an average of 15.42, with two half centuries and a high score of 67. As a right-arm fast-medium bowler, he took 31 wickets at a bowling average of 37.37, with one five wicket haul of 5 for 63 against Essex at Brentwood in 1966. In addition to playing cricket at Cambridge, he also played football for Cambridge University A.F.C., gaining a blue.

After graduating from Cambridge, Palfreman became a solicitor. He later served as the chairman of the Nottinghamshire Cricket Board.
