= Henry Groves (cricketer) =

English cricketer & soldier (1896–1992)

Personal information
- Full name: Henry Basil Melvin Groves
- Born: 21 April 1896; Newport Pagnell, Buckinghamshire, England
- Died: 4 April 1992 (aged 95); Durban, Natal, South Africa
- Batting: Unknown
- Relatives: Mike Groves (son)

Domestic team information
- Years: Team
- 1926/27: Europeans

Career statistics
Competition	First-class
Matches	1
Runs scored	47
Batting average	23.50
100s/50s	–/–
Top score	28
Catches/stumpings	–/–
- Source: Cricinfo, 14 December 2023

Henry Basil Melvin Groves MC (21 April 1896 – 4 April 1992) was an English first-class cricketer and an officer in the British Army. He served with distinction in the Tanks Corps, being awarded the Military Cross (MC) at the Battle of Passchendaele in 1917 and later gained a bar to his MC in 1918. His military career lasted from 1915 to 1947. He also played first-class cricket for the Europeans cricket team in British India.

== Life and military career ==
The son of the Reverend J. F. Groves, he was born in April 1896 at Newport Pagnell and was educated at Nottingham High School. Groves finished his education at the beginning of the First World War and soon joined the conflict. He was commissioned into the Cameronians in April 1915 as a temporary second lieutenant, and transferred to the Machine Gun Corps in May 1916. He was promoted to lieutenant in November 1916, prior to being made an acting captain in April 1917. He transferred to the Tank Corps later in 1917 and shortly after transferring, he was awarded the Military Cross (MC) during the Battle of Passchendaele for guiding his tanks through heavy artillery and machine gun fire, in addition to making to efforts ahead of the line to rescue an injured officer; a bar as added to his MC in July 1918, for successfully directing his tanks on foot whilst under heavy machine gun, direction which his bar citation claimed was largely responsible for the infantry reaching their objectives with slight casualties. Toward the end of the war, he was made a temporary major whilst commanding a company, an appointment which he relinquished in October 1918.

After the war had ended, Groves was appointed to the staff in December 1918. He was transferred to the general list in the same month, before joining the Essex Regiment in December 1920 as a permanent lieutenant. He was concurrently seconded back to the Tank Corps as an executive officer. By 1923, he was an assistant-instructor at the Tank Gunnery School at Bovington Camp, having returned permanently to the Tank Corps. Promotion to captain followed in October 1925, with him being appointed an adjutant in the Royal Tank Corps (RTC) in December of the same year. Whilst serving in British India in 1926, Groves made a single appearance in first-class cricket for the Europeans cricket team against the Hindus cricket team at Poona in the final of the 1926–27 Bombay Quadrangular Tournament. Batting twice in the match, he top-scored in the Europeans first innings with 28, before being dismissed by Ladha Ramji. In their second innings, he was promoted to open the batting, scoring 19 runs before being dismissed by S. S. Joshi.

By October 1929, Groves had been restored to an instructional role at the Tank Gunnery School, where he was appointed a chief instructor in March 1932, before relinquishing the appointment in October 1933. He was later appointed a general staff officer for physical training at the Army School of Physical Training at Aldershot Garrison in February 1935, being appointed chief instructor there from May 1936 to April 1938. He had been promoted to major in April 1937, He served in the Second World War with the RTC, eventually retiring from active service on account of disability in July 1947, at which point he was granted the honorary rank of lieutenant colonel. Groves died in South Africa in April 1992. His son, Mike, was also a first-class cricketer.
