= John K. Inglis =

John Kenneth Inglis, B.Sc., B.A., Dip. Ed., M.Inst. Biol. (1933 - 5 March 2011), was a British biologist, writer, and Further and Higher Education lecturer in Oxford, England.

== Life ==
Inglis studied at Nottingham High School and The Becket School, and left school with insufficient qualifications for University entry. He took employment for four years as a technician in chemistry and physics laboratories, whilst studying at the technical college to gain acceptable examinations for University entry. Whilst at University, he lived in rooms within bicycling distance of college. With no financial backing from divorced parents, both living in Africa, he supported his college studies by night-portering at a local YMCA hostel, chemistry teaching at High Pavement Grammar school, and by working as a hormones research technician in an industrial hormones research department. At University, Inglis gained an Arts degree (psychology and philosophy), and a Natural Sciences degree (animal physiology and biochemistry). He later gained a post-graduate diploma in Educational Psychology and Learning. Inglis was in his late twenties when he searched for his first full-time employment.

Inglis joined the new Oxford College of Technology as one of the founding science faculty members. This college evolved out of a John Brookes earlier foundation, eventually becoming a Polytechnic and later Oxford Brookes University. The biomedical students were drawn from local employers in hospitals and University research laboratories, as well as full-time students seeking University entry qualifications.

In the United States, near Chicago, Inglis tutored anatomy, physiology, biochemistry, and health, to undergraduates at College of Lake County.

In Canada, near Toronto, Inglis tutored undergraduates in anatomy, physiology, and diet therapy, at Durham College. His textbook work in Canada was in receipt of the financial `Cocking Award` given annually by a Commonwealth teachers' association for publication work.

Inglis produced 12 textbooks including: "A Textbook of Human Biology"; "Introduction to Laboratory Animal Science and Technology"; "Science for Hairdressing Students"; and "Oxbook", a handbook for foreign students in Oxford.

Until his death in 2011, he lived in Oxford, with his Dresden-born wife, Ulrike. His brother, Dr. Douglas B. Inglis, is a consultant chemist, and former university lecturer, living near Cardiff in Wales.

== Other activities ==
Co-founder and secretary of Oxford International Students' Society. A part-time student at Oxford University reading Philosophy and Politics. Writer of short stories and magazine articles.
