= Nottingham High School =

Independent public school in Nottingham, England

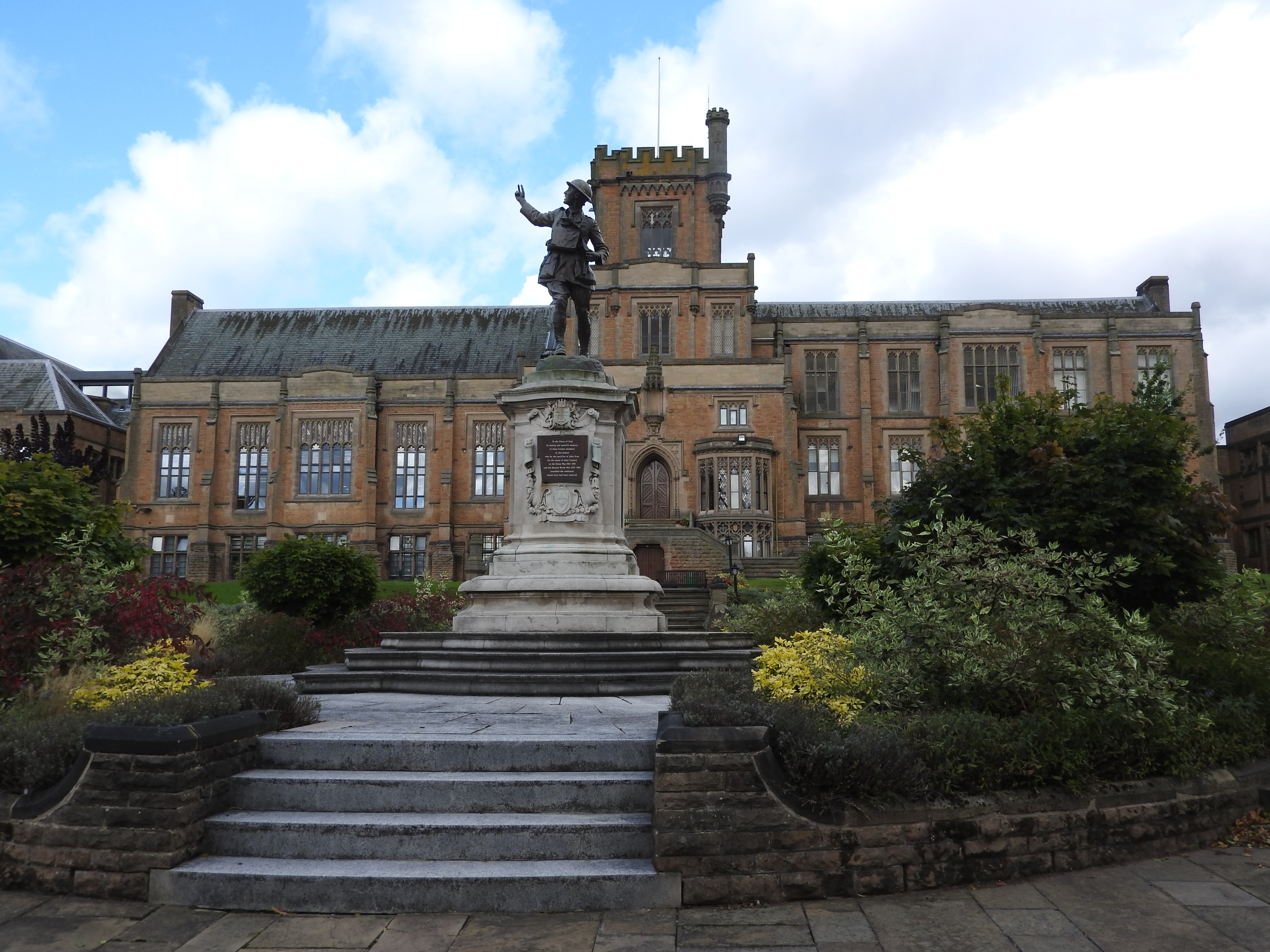
- South side of the school

Location
- Waverley Mount; Nottingham, Nottinghamshire, NG7 4ED; England; 52°57′45″N 1°09′33″W

Information
- Type: Private day school Public school
- Motto: Latin: Lauda finem (Praise to the end)
- Established: 1513; 513 years ago
- Founders: Dame Agnes Mellers, Sir Thomas Lovell and King Henry VIII
- Local authority: Nottingham City Council
- Department for Education URN: 122915 Tables
- Chairman of Governors: Steven Banks
- Head: Headmaster of the Senior School: Andrew Holman; Head of the Infant and Junior School: Polly Bennett
- Staff: <130
- Gender: Co-educational since 2015; previously boys
- Age: 4 to 18
- Enrolment: 1186
- Houses: Senior: Cooper's; Maples'; Mellers'; White's; Junior: Cooper's; Maples'; Mellers'; White's (Formerly Balls', Hardys', Tonkin's, Treases').
- Publication: Former Senior School: Old Nottinghamian; Former 'Junior School': Young Nottinghamian; Former 'Lovell House': The Squirrel
- Alumni: Old Nottinghamians
- Website: Nottingham High School

Nottingham High School is a private, coeducational day school in Nottingham, England, consisting of an infant and junior school (ages 4–11), and senior school (ages 11–18). It was founded in 1513 by Dame Agnes Mellers, as a free grammar school for boys, with a charter signed by Henry VIII. The school is a member of the Headmasters' and Headmistresses' Conference and has been coeducational since 2015.

There were 1186 students enrolled as at December 2025, of whom 262 were in the sixth form.

== History ==
=== Foundation ===
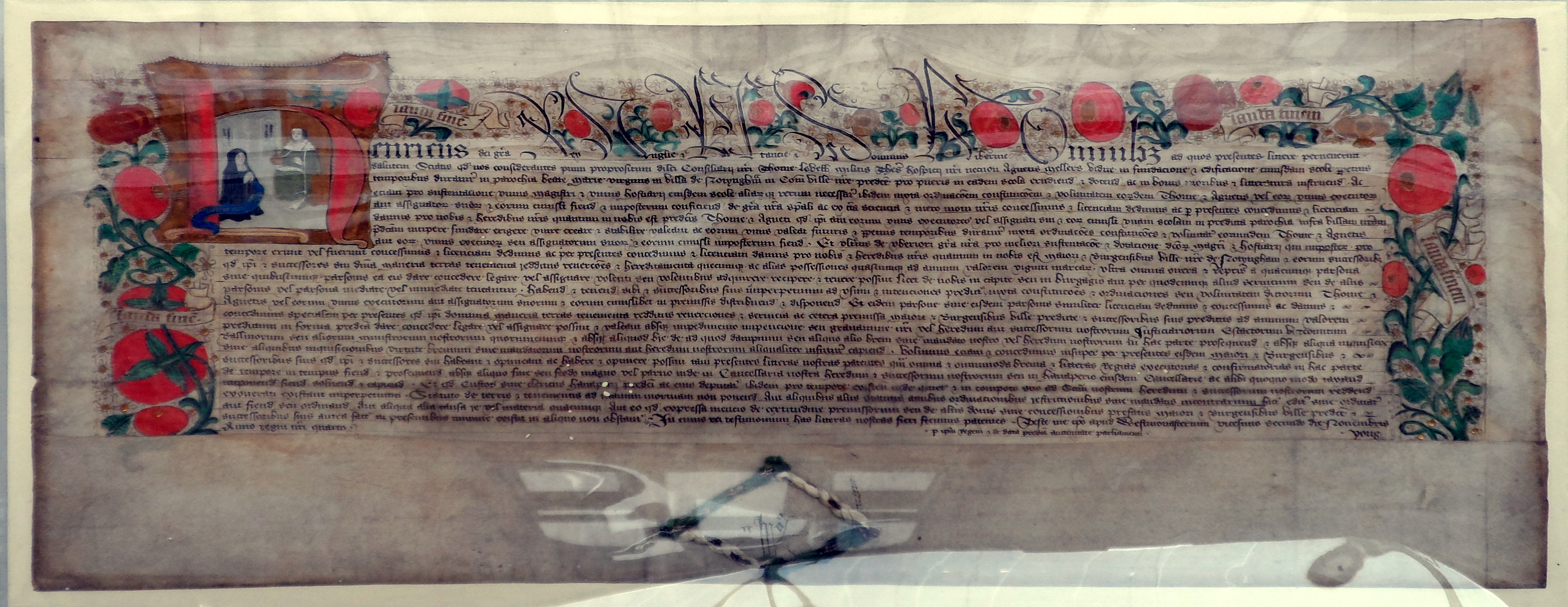
The original 1512 charter approving the foundation of a free grammar school in Nottingham

In 1513, the "Free School" was founded by Dame Agnes Mellers, after the death of her husband Richard, partly in his memory, but also as atonement for wrongdoings against the people of Nottingham. To do so she enlisted help from Sir Thomas Lovell as governor of Nottingham Castle and Secretary to the Treasury. Through their combined efforts, Henry VIII sealed the school's foundation deed on the 22 November that year. It is unclear whether this was a new institution or an endowment of an existing school, of which records exist back to 1289. Almost 20,000 boys are estimated to have attended between 1513 and 2013.

In the foundation deed, Mellers provided for a commemoration service in St Mary's Church in the Lace Market "on the Feast of the Translation of St Richard of Chichester, namely 16 June" each year, although the service "is now held on the nearest Saturday to that date." With the exception of Nottingham Goose Fair, this is the most ancient ceremonial event still held in the city of Nottingham, and the oldest still largely in its original form (the Goose Fair now being a funfair rather than a livestock fair), although there seems to be no record of it being held between the mid-16th century and its revival in 1923.

=== Coat of arms ===
The College of Arms granted the school a coat of arms in 1949, the full blazon being:

Ermine, a lozenge argent charged with three blackbirds rising proper. On a chief gules, an open book also proper, garnished or, between two ducal coronets of the last. And for the crest, on a wreath argent and gules, a squirrel sejant gules holding between the paws a ducal coronet or. Mantling, argent and gules. Motto "Lauda Finem".

The motto, Lauda finem, is Latin for "praise [to] the end".

=== Remembrance Day service ===
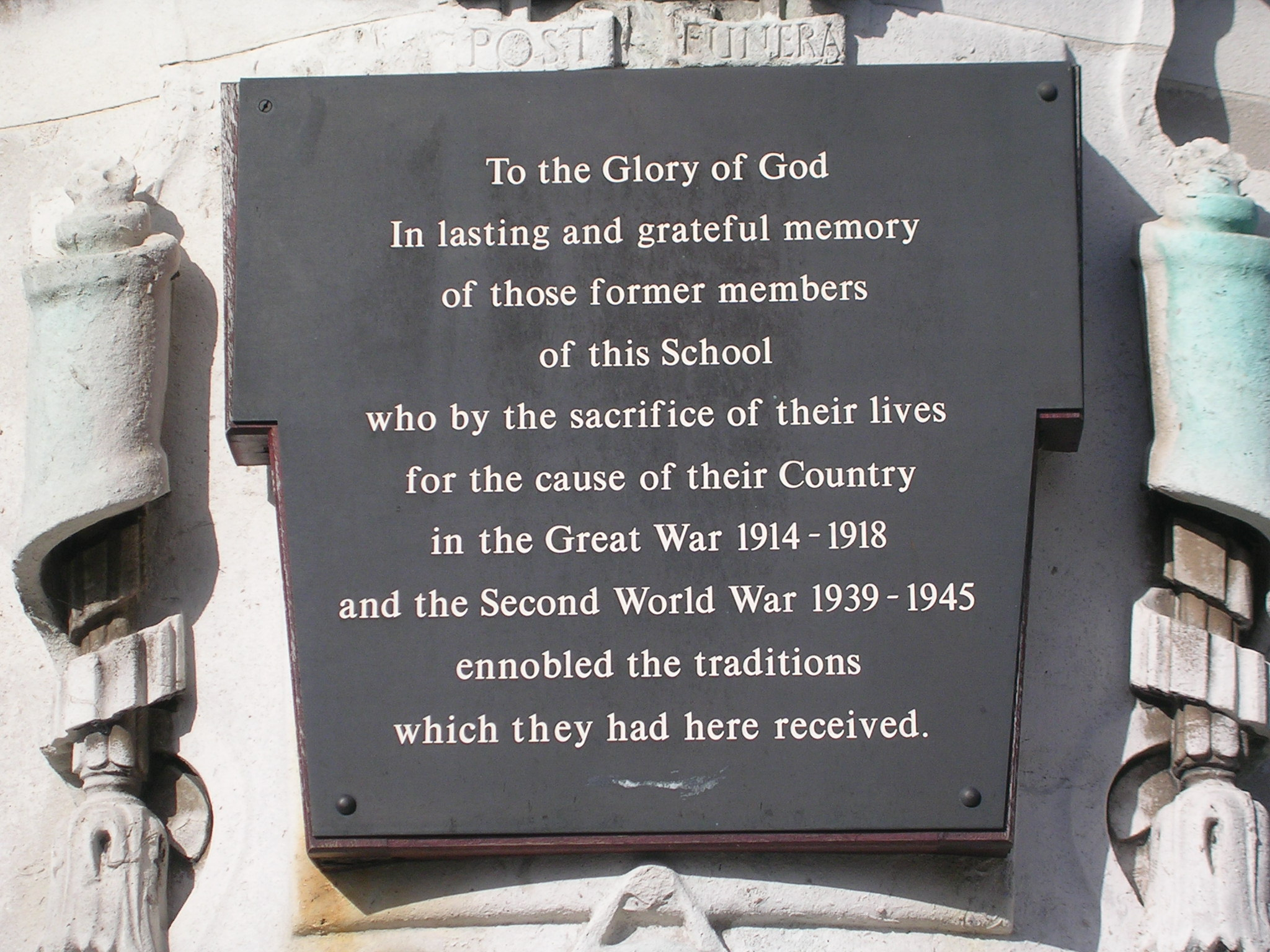
Plaque on the war memorial

An annual Remembrance Day service on 11 November is attended by the whole school with the headmaster, president of the Old Nottinghamians and the school captain placing wreaths at the war memorial. Scholars attend a morning special assembly usually in the Player Hall, at which a minute's silence is observed. Representatives of the school's Combined Cadet Force mark their respect with a parade around the main school building.

== Premises ==
=== Location ===
Since 1868 the school has stood high on Waverley Mount to the north of the city centre, looking down towards its foundation site in St Mary's Church and later building in Stoney Street. The present site has undergone a long programme of building and development.

Main building

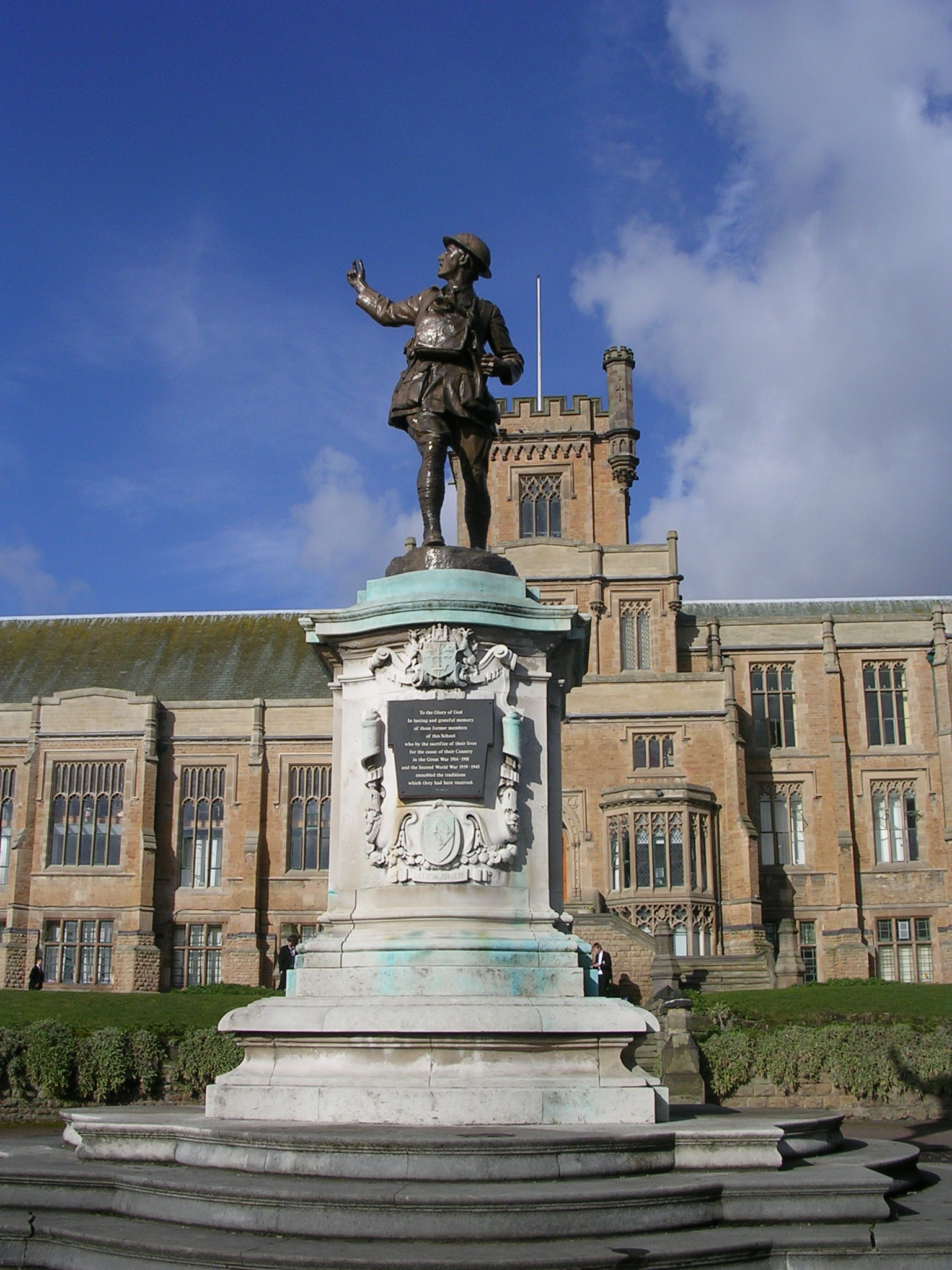
War memorial at the south gates

An example of Gothic Revival architecture, the first school building on the present site, built between 1866 and 1867, was designed by Thomas Simpson. It consists of a tower and three wings: West Wing, Middle Corridor, and East Wing. West Wing houses classrooms for mathematics, English and geography. Housed in Middle Corridor are the learning support department, two ICT centres, two language laboratories, religious studies classrooms, two multi-purpose lecture theatres, the school library, and staff offices. East Wing contains the old gymnasium, the Player assembly hall and classrooms for modern languages, history, and classics. The school front and other features are Grade II listed.

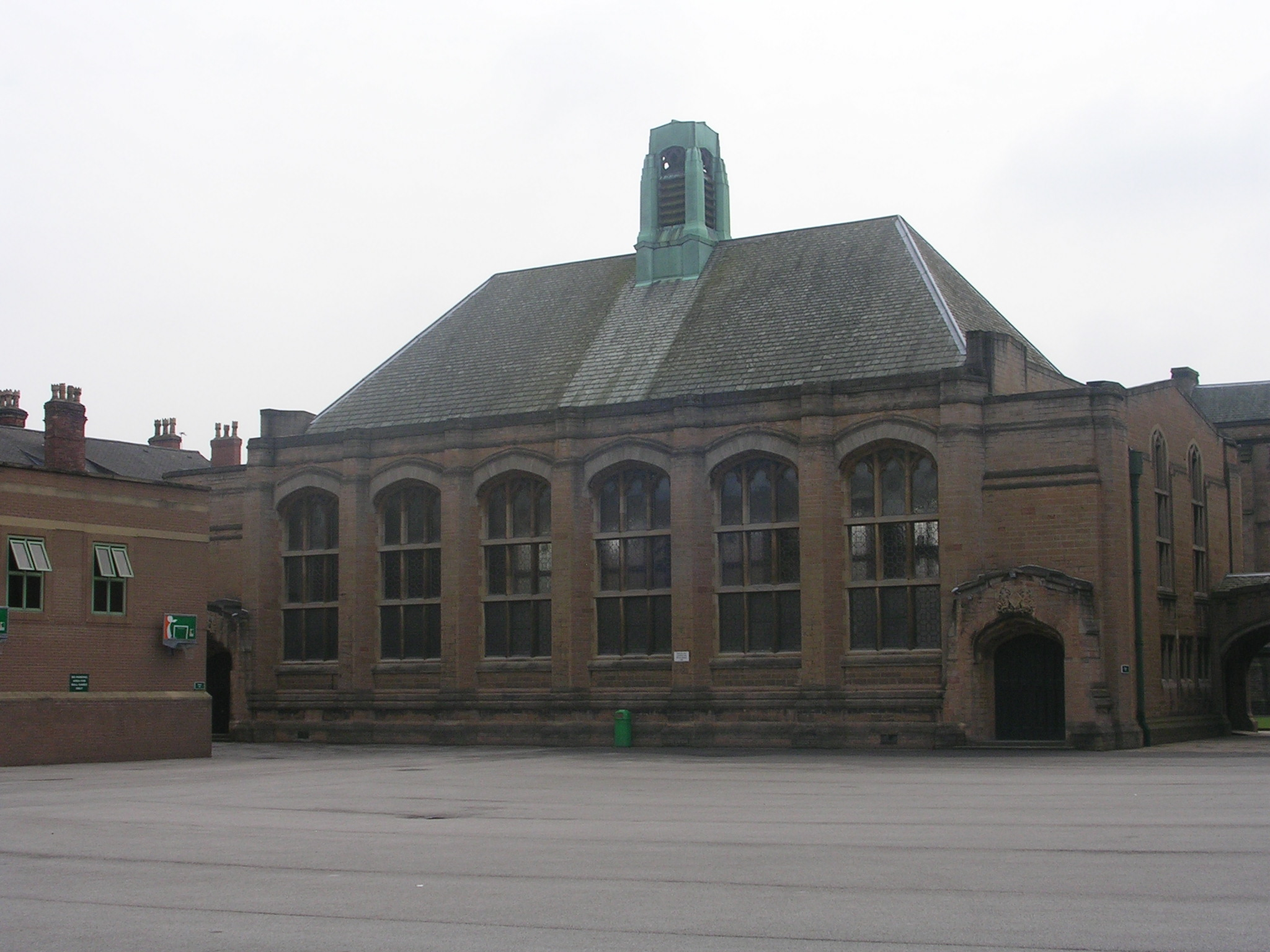
The Player Hall

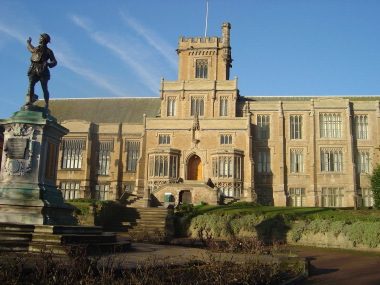
The south side of the school, showing the war memorial

Additions

To the west, the Founder Hall building was built in 1963 to mark the school's 450th anniversary. It includes the school's swimming pool and the Founder Hall itself, and acts as a performing venue to supplement the Player Hall. A drama studio was added in 2013 to mark the school's 500th anniversary.

The Simon Djanogly Science Building from 1984 is situated to the south west with 13 laboratories for all three sciences. A 25-yard CCF shooting range remains in the basement. The building was opened on 2 March 1984 by the Duke of Edinburgh.

In front of the science building is the music school, completed in 1997. This houses the Lady Carol Djanogly Recital Hall, the Jones Trust Music Room, a music technology studio, a resources centre, seven instrumental teaching rooms, and a larger brass teaching room, a percussion studio and a classroom for Infant and Junior School pupils.

In 1989 a sports hall was built on land to the north-east of the site formerly occupied by fives court and a shooting range.

In the north-west corner is the Sir Harry Djanogly Art, Design and Technology Centre. The ground floor was built in the mid-1990s, and a first floor was added in the 2003/2004 academic year.

Lovell House Building

Waverley House School, to the west of the main site, was purchased in 2008. Its buildings were refurbished and renamed the Lovell House Infant School. In 2013, this single-sex establishment was combined with the Junior School to form Nottingham High Infant and Junior School.

=== Playing field ===
The school's games field is not on the main site but at Valley Road, approximately 3 miles (4.8 km) to the north. Historically farmland from as early as 1878, namely Harvey's Farm; then briefly Hucknall Road Farm in 1920, it was converted to use as a playing field around 1960. It features a number of rugby pitches and posts during winter, which are converted for athletics in the spring, with a running track and areas for shot put, javelin, discus, pole vault, hurdles and high jump. During the summer, the ground is used for cricket, with nets put up and squares re-established for the season. Tennis courts, netball courts, and an archery range are also located there. The pavilion has several changing rooms on the ground and first floors, and a refreshment area for staff and guests. Until 1897, boys played sports and had their PE lessons at the Forest Recreation Ground.

== School organisation ==
The junior and senior schools both have four houses, each named after a person connected with the school. The house system plays an integral role in school life.

=== Junior school houses ===
The junior school's four houses are named after former pupils or staff who served with distinction in the First World War and were killed in action or died of their wounds. Ball's House recalls Albert Ball, a fighter pilot in the RFC and pupil at the school in 1907–1909, Hardy's House Theodore Hardy, an assistant master in 1891–1907 and a British Army chaplain in 1916–1918, Tonkin's House FC Tonkin, a former pupil who served in the King's Royal Rifle Corps, and Trease's House Reginald Trease, a pupil at the school in 1898–1905. However, in 2025, for the purpose of bringing the Junior and Senior school together, the Junior School now uses the Senior School Houses( Mellers', Maples, Cooper's and Whites)

=== Senior school houses ===
The four houses in the senior school are Mellers', named after the school's founder, Cooper's, named after Frederick Cooper, an artist who in 1872 donated almost 2 acres (8,100 m^{2}) of land to the school, Maples', named after Samuel Maples, a former pupil who bequeathed £3,000 to fund scholarships in 1892, and White's, after Sir Thomas White, who endowed a charity to provide interest-free loans to "young men of good name and thrift" in the Midlands, some money from which was lent to the school in slightly questionable circumstances in the mid-19th century).

=== Curriculum ===
Nottingham High School offers a wide range of GCSE, Advanced Subsidiary-Level (AS-level) and General Certificate of Education Advanced-Level (GCE A-level) subjects. Many are also studied by younger pupils at the school in years seven and nine.

Sixth-form subjects include Ancient Greek, art, biology, chemistry, classical civilization, computer science, design and technology, drama, economics, English language, English literature, Extended Project Qualification (EPQ), French, further mathematics, geography, government and politics, German, history, Latin, mathematics, music, music technology, physical education, physics, psychology, religious studies, statistics, and Spanish.

== Media ==
Some of a 1990 episode of the TV series "Boon", starring Michael Elphick, was filmed at the school, with some pupils as extras. The story was entitled "Bully Boys", the sixth episode of the fifth series, broadcast on 30 October 1990. The main playground, the Bridge Library (now the library reception), and the Valley Road playing fields were shown.

Kevin Fear (the then school's headmaster) and certain boys, were filmed by ITV for a news story shown as part of the news programme "ITV News Central". Filming took place at several school locations, including the headmaster's office, various classrooms and the Lower School Library. The news was that the school had announced it would admit girls – for the first time in its 500-year history – from 2015/2016.

== List of masters ==
List of Nottingham High School masters
Date	Name	College	Notes
1513–1528	John Smith	BCanL (Cambridge)	
1528–1539	Robert Calton		
1539–1563	George Somer		
1563–1565	Henry Cockrame	BCanL (Oxford)	
1565–1575	Brian Garnet		
1575–1584	John Depup	MA (Trinity College, Cambridge)	*
1584–1587	Robert Ableson	BA (Queens' College, Cambridge)	
1587–1592	Christopher Heylowe	MA (St John's College, Cambridge)	*
1592–1607	John Lowe	BA (Caius College, Cambridge)	*
1607–1616	Thomas Soresbie	MA (Queen's College, Oxford)	†
1616–1628	Robert Theobald	MA (Trinity College, Cambridge)	*
1628–1657	Thomas Leake	MA (St John's College, Cambridge)	†
1657–1664	Henry Pitts	MA (Pembroke College, Cambridge)	*
1664	Henry Watkinson	(St John's College, Cambridge)	*
1664–1672	Samuel Birch	MA (Emmanuel College, Cambridge)	*
1672–1688	Jeremiah Cudworth	MA (Christ's College, Cambridge)	*
1688–1691	Gowin Knight	MA (Christ Church, Oxford)	†
1691–1707	Edward Griffith	MA (Queens' College, Cambridge)	*
1707–1720	Richard Johnson	BA (St John's College, Cambridge)	*
1718–1719	William Smeaton	MA (Queens' College, Cambridge)	*
1719	William Saunders	MA (Trinity Hall, Cambridge)	*
N/A	Thomas Miles	MA (Clare College, Cambridge)	‡
1720–1722	John Womack	BA (Corpus Christi College, Cambridge)	†
1722–1731	John Swaile	MA (Cambridge)	†
1731	Edward Chappell	MA (Jesus College, Cambridge)	*
1731–1758	John Henson	(Sidney Sussex College, Cambridge)	†
1758–1793	Timothy Wylde		*
1793–1806	John Challand Forrest	MA (Queens' College, Cambridge)	†
1806–1819	John Toplis	MA, BD (Queens' College, Cambridge)	*
1819–1833	Robert Wood	MA, DD (St John's College, Cambridge)	*
1833–1860	William Butler	MA (Queen's College, Oxford)	*
1861–1868	Frederick Teeling Cusins	MA (St John's College, Cambridge)	*
1868–1884	Robert Dixon	MA, LLD (St John's College, Cambridge)	*
1884–1901	James Gow	MA, LittD (Trinity College, Cambridge)	*
1901–1925	George Sherbrooke Turpin	MA (St John's College, Cambridge); DSc (London)	*
1925–1953	Cedric Lawton Reynolds	MA (Clare College, Cambridge)	*
1954–1970	Kenneth Robert Imeson	MA (Sidney Sussex College, Cambridge)	*
1970–1995	Dennis Trevor Witcombe	OBE; MA, BLitt (St John's College, Oxford); PhD (Manchester)	*
1995–2007	Christopher Stuart Parker	CBE; BA (Bristol); FRSA	*
2007–2025	Kevin David Fear	BA (Southampton)	*
2025	Ian Paul Spedding	BS (Hull)	
2025–	Andrew Neil Holman	MA (Magdalene College, Cambridge)	

* Resigned or retired
† Died in office
‡ Never assumed post

Brian Garnet (headmaster 1565 – c. 1575) is notable as the father of the Jesuit priest Henry Garnet, who was executed for his involvement in the Gunpowder Plot.

== Notable alumni ==
All former pupils and staff members are granted the title "Old Nottinghamian". For more than a century, the Old Nottinghamians' Society has existed continuously, with its origins dating back to 1897, at which time it was called the NHS Dinner Committee. Between 1902 and 1961 it was known as the Nottingham High School Old Boys' Society.

=== Arts ===
- Michael Eaton (b. 1954), writer
- Christopher Hogwood (1941–2014), classical musician, harpsichordist, scholar and conductor
- Thomas Cecil Howitt (1889–1968), architect responsible for the design of the Nottingham Council House
- D. H. Lawrence (1885–1930), writer and publisher
- Nicholas McGegan (b. 1950), classical musician, conductor
- Geoffrey Trease (1909–1998), author

=== Academia and religion ===
- Eric Abbott (1906–1984), Warden of Keble College, Oxford; Dean of Westminster
- Michael Argyle (1925-2002), social psychologist
- Samuel Ayscough (1745–1804), index compiler
- Ben G. Davis (b. 1970), chemist and fellow of Pembroke College, Oxford
- Henry Garnet (1555–1606), Jesuit priest executed 1606 for his complicity in the Gunpowder Plot
- John K. Inglis (died 2011), biologist, writer and lecturer
- Frank Byron Jevons (1858–1936), Vice-Chancellor of the University of Durham
- Robert Mcfarlane (b. 1976), travel writer and fellow of Emmanuel College, Cambridge
- Victor Mundella (1866–1939), Physicist and Principal of Sunderland Technical College
- Thomas Wingate Todd (1885–1938), anthropologist, orthodontist
- R. M. W. Dixon (b. 1939), linguist

=== Armed forces ===
- Albert Ball (1896–1917), the first Royal Flying Corps to be awarded the Victoria Cross
- Theodore Hardy (1863–1918), NHS schoolmaster, non-combatant chaplain in the Great War, awarded the Victoria Cross

=== Media and entertainment ===
- Kenneth Adam (1908–1978), Controller of the BBC
- Malcolm Balen (living), author and broadcaster
- Raymond Buckland (1934–2017), author and occultist
- Michael Bywater (b. 1953), writer and broadcaster
- Leslie Crowther (1933–1996), comedian and quiz show host
- Trevor Dann (b. 1951), broadcaster and producer of the 1985 Live Aid concert
- David Leigh (b. 1946), investigative journalist and investigative executive editor for The Guardian
- Arun Maini (b. 1995), technology YouTuber 'Mrwhosetheboss'
- Keith Mansfield (b. 1965), writer
- Simon Miller (living), writer/director
- Chris Moncrieff (1931–2019), Press Association political journalist
- Andrew Nickolds (1949–2022), writer
- Tim Royes (1964–2007), music video director and editor
- Daniel Storey (living), writer and broadcaster
- Jonny Sweet (b. 1985), comedian and actor
- Michael Watts (1938–2018), journalist and broadcaster

=== Civil and diplomatic service ===
- Alan Charlton (b. 1952), British ambassador to Brazil
- Peter Gregson (1936–2015), permanent secretary of the Department of Trade and Industry
- Richard Lloyd-Jones (b. 1933), permanent secretary of the Welsh Office
- Lord Richardson of Duntisborne, governor of the Bank of England from 1973 until 1983
- Douglas Wass (1923–2017), sometime permanent secretary of the Treasury and Head of the Home Civil Service
- Geoffrey Owen Whittaker (1932–2015), governor of Anguilla 1987–1989

=== Commerce ===
- Jesse Boot later Lord Trent (1850–1931), founder of the chemist chain Boots (now the Boots Group)
- Roger Carr (b. 1946), knight, businessman
- John Player (d. 1884), tobacconist (John Player & Sons), after whom the school's Player Hall is named

=== Law ===
- Sir Roderic Wood (b. 1951), High Court judge

=== Politics ===
- Ed Balls (born 1967), former Labour MP, secretary of state for children, schools and families, economic secretary to the treasury and shadow chancellor of the exchequer
- Jonathan Bullock (born 1963), former Brexit Party member of the European Parliament for the East Midlands constituency
- Kenneth Clarke (born 1940), independent Member of Parliament, former Conservative Lord Chancellor and justice secretary, chancellor of the exchequer and home secretary
- Ed Davey (born 1965), MP, Liberal Democrat Member of Parliament, minister in the Department for Business, Innovation and Skills and leader of the Liberal Democrats
- David Frost (b. 1965), British politician, diplomat and civil servant
- Geoff Hoon (born 1953), former Member of Parliament, secretary of state for Transport, minister of state for Europe, secretary of state for defence and leader of the House of Commons
- Sir James Lester (1932–2021), Conservative politician
- Piers Merchant (1951–2009), former Conservative Member of Parliament and former general secretary of UKIP
- James Morris (born 1967), MP, Conservative Member of Parliament

=== Science and technology ===
- Ben G. Davis (b. 1970), University of Oxford
- Thomas Hawksley (1807–1893), civil engineer and chief engineer at the Nottingham Waterworks Company
- J. P. Knight (1828–1886), inventor of the traffic light
- Frank Nabarro (1916–2006), solid-state physicist

=== Sport ===
- Patrick Bamford (b. 1993), footballer
- Charles Caborn (b. 1856, death date unknown), footballer for Nottingham Forest who appeared in their first FA Cup match.
- Anuj Dal (b. 1996), professional cricketer
- Anthony Douglas (b. 1985), Olympic short track speed skater
- Henry Groves (1896–1992), cricketer
- Graham Harding (b. 1966), cricketer
- David Haywood (b. 1945), cricketer
- Sam King (b. 2003), professional cricketer
- Alex Lewington (b. 1991), rugby union player
- Leonard Lindley (1861–1915), footballer and cricketer, brother of Tinsley
- Tinsley Lindley (1865–1940), international footballer and cricketer, brother of Leonard
- Henry Nwume (b. 1977), professional rugby union player and bobsleigh Olympian
- Anthony Palfreman (b. 1946), cricketer and cricket administrator
- Reg Simpson (1920–2013), England cricketer
- Greig Tonks (b. 1989), rugby union player
- Andy Turner (b. 1980), professional Olympic sprint hurdler

== See also ==
- Nottingham Girls' High School
- Listed buildings in Nottingham (Hyson Green and Arboretum ward)
