= Charles Caborn =

English footballer

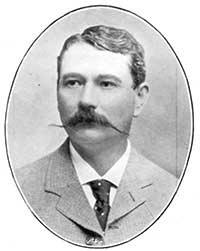

Personal information
- Full name: Charles John Caborn
- Date of birth: 25 October 1856.
- Place of birth: Nottingham
- Date of death: 1905, age 48
- Place of death: Nottingham
- Position: Defender

Senior career*
Years	Team	Apps	(Gls)
- Nottingham Castle
1878-1888	Nottingham Forest		
- * Club domestic league appearances and goals

Charles John Caborn (25 October 1856 – 1905) was an English footballer who played for Nottingham Forest. He was educated at Nottingham High School.

Caborn played for Nottingham Castle FC and captained them from 1876. He moved to Forest when the Castle club disbanded in 1878.

Caborn was a back for Nottingham Forest and made 32 FA Cup appearances as well as in many friendly games. There was no league in these seasons. He appeared in the first known photograph of Nottingham Forest for the season 1878-79.

His first known appearance was on 14 October 1878 in a friendly against Stoke and made his competitive debut in Forest's first-ever FA Cup 1st Round against Notts County.

He played in the Nottingham Forest side that are the only English team to play an FA Cup Semi-Final in Scotland when they played Queens Park in Edinburgh in the year 1885.
