= John Guest =

John Guest may refer to:

== People ==
- John Guest (judge) (died 1707), Chief Justice of the Supreme Court of Pennsylvania
- John Josiah Guest (1785–1852), British industrialist
- John Guest (naval officer) (1822–1879), United States Navy officer
- John Guest (politician) (1867–1931), British Labour Party Member of Parliament
- Jack Guest (1906–1972), Canadian rowing Olympic medal winner
- John Rodney Guest (born 1935), British microbiologist
- John Guest (geologist) (1938–2012), British volcanologist and planetary scientist

== Other ==
- John Guest (company), British manufacturer of push-in fittings, pipe and plastic plumbing systems
