= Guest (2020 film) =

- Directed by: Finn Callan
- Written by: Finn Callan
- Produced by: Ivan Veselov
- Starring: Melania Crisan; Jessica Munna; Anna Fraser
- Cinematography: Fyodor Houtheusen
- Edited by: Trifa Keedo
- Music by: Oxxymoron
- Production company: Project Violet Productions
- Release date: 27 August 2020 (FrightFest)
- Running time: 12 minutes
- Country: United Kingdom
- Language: English

Guest is a 2020 British psychological horror short film directed and written by Finn Callan. It stars Melania Crisan as a disturbed young woman who wakes up in a stranger's house with several injuries after encountering a creature called The Guest. The film also stars Jessica Munna and Anna Fraser. The film premiered on 27 August 2020 at FrightFest and, on 24 December 2020, was uploaded to YouTube.

Upon release, the film received very positive reviews from critics, praising the film's direction, cinematography, monster design and special effects. A sequel was released in 2023.

== Plot ==
A frightened young woman named Mary wakes up in the bedroom of a stranger's house with injuries that have left her partially blind and deaf. The homeowner (The Woman), who bandaged her up after discovering her in the bathroom that morning, manages to slightly restore her hearing with a hearing aid and asks her what happened.

In a flashback sequence, Mary remembers the previous night where she was chased through the countryside by a tall, slender creature with no eyelids billed as "The Guest". During the chase, Mary finds The Woman's house and breaks inside to escape from The Guest. Finding the house seemingly empty, Mary quickly arms herself with a kitchen knife and hides in the bathroom, only to discover that The Guest is waiting for her inside. Seemingly driven mad by The Guest's presence, Mary pours a bottle of bleach over her eyes and plunges the knife in her ears, blinding and deafening herself as she was at the start of the film.

Frightened at Mary's explanation, The Woman quickly leaves the room and locks the door, trapping Mary inside. Mary then pulls back her bandages to see that The Guest is sitting on the bed next to her with a sad expression on its face, much to Mary's surprise and confusion. The film then abruptly ends.

== Cast ==
- Melania Crisan as Mary
- Jessica Munna as The Woman
- Anna Fraser as The Guest

== Production ==
=== Monster design ===
Finn Callan looked to various pre-existing works for inspiration for The Guest's design and which he brought together like a "jigsaw" and had the film's prosthetics artist Francesca Giacovelli illustrate. He cited films such as The Draggs from Fantastic Planet, the Fishermen from Balance and Christiane from Eyes Without a Face as the key inspirational points during the process.

=== Special effects ===
Deciding early on that the special effects to create The Guest would be all practical, Callan enlisted the help of Francesca to create the elaborate special effects make up which took 6 hours to apply to Anna Fraser who played The Guest, who Callan said compared the process to "being buried alive".

== Release and reception ==
The short film was first shown on at FrightFest on 27 August 2020 and then went around the American horror film festival circuit, premiering in North America at Screamfest on 8 October. During its festival run, it received acclaim from various horror publications, praising the film's direction, cinematography, special effects and monster design.

On 24 December 2020, Callan uploaded the short to YouTube with a suicide prevention disclaimer placed before the film. The short film quickly became popular and, as of November 2024, has received over 15 million views on the site. Several notable YouTubers have reacted to Guest on YouTube since its upload, including CoryxKenshin and Jacksepticeye.

=== Festival selections ===
- 2020 - FrightFest (World Premiere)
- 2020 - Screamfest Horror Film Festival
- 2020 - Telluride Horror Show
- 2020 - Knoxville Horror Film Festival
- 2020 - New York City Horror Film Festival
- 2020 - IFI HorrorThon
- 2020 - 6ix Screams International Horror Film Festival
- 2020 - HorrorFest International
- 2020 - HorrOrigins Film Festival

== Sequel ==
Callan wrote and directed a sequel to Guest, which was financed by Chilling, a horror relaxation app. Anna Fraser will return as The Guest in the sequel, with Simon Bigg also being cast. He also stated that he planned for the sequel to Guest to be around twice the length of its predecessor.

Guest 2 was released on YouTube on November 24, 2023.
