= William Guest =

William Guest may refer to:

- William Guest (rugby union) (1903–1991), English player for Wakefield RFC, later a Territorial Army major
- William S. Guest (1913–1992), U.S. Navy rear-admiral
- William Guest (singer) (1941–2015), American R&B/soul singer, a member of Gladys Knight & the Pips
- William Guest (priest), English founder of Milton Mount College
- Billy Guest, English footballer

== See also ==
- Bill Guest, Canadian game show host
