= Ivor Guest =

Ivor Guest may refer to:

- Ivor Guest, 1st Baron Wimborne (1835–1914), Welsh industrialist
- Ivor Guest, 1st Viscount Wimborne (1873–1939), British politician, one of the last Lords Lieutenant of Ireland
- Ivor Guest, 2nd Viscount Wimborne (1903–1967), British politician
- Ivor Guest, 3rd Viscount Wimborne (1939–1993), British businessman
- Ivor Guest, 4th Viscount Wimborne (born 1968), British record producer and composer
- Ivor Forbes Guest (1920–2018), British lawyer and ballet historian, husband of movement notation expert Ann Hutchinson Guest
- Ivor Guest (died 1917), elder brother of Ernest Lucas Guest and uncle of Ivor Forbes Guest
