= Guest (lunar crater) =

Crater on the Moon

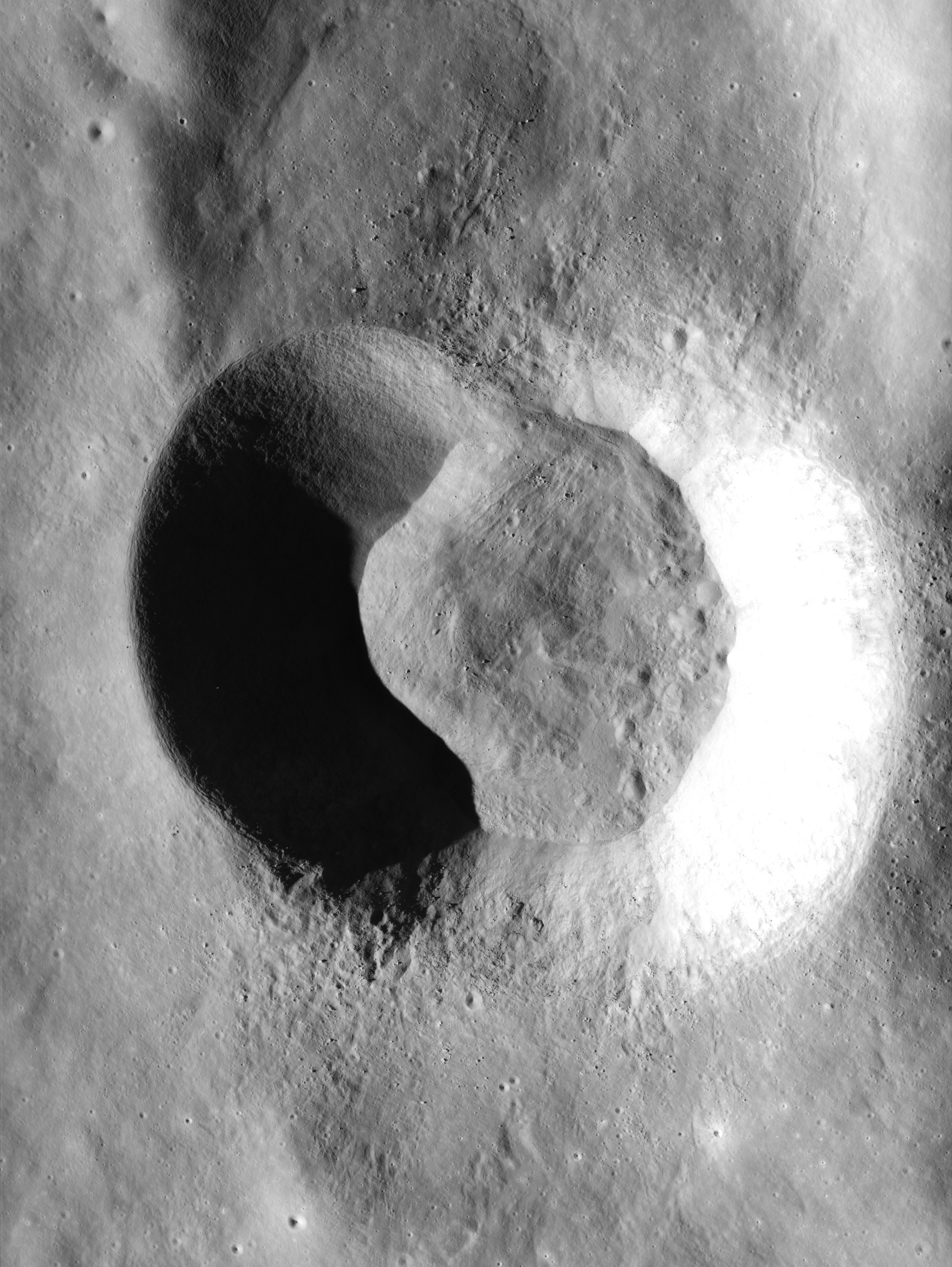
- Apollo 15 panoramic camera image
- Coordinates: 19.79°S 117.39°E
- Diameter: 19.79 km
- Eponym: John E. Guest

Guest is a lunar impact crater that is located on the far side of the Moon, just west of the large crater Fermi and north of Izsak. Guest overlies an unnamed crater of similar size to the north, forming a pair. With its high albedo, the crater is probably young.

The crater is named after the British geologist, vulcanologist and planetary scientist John Guest by the IAU in 2017.

== See also ==
- List of people with craters of the Moon named after them
