= Melville Guest =

English cricketer and diplomat

Personal information
- Full name: Melville Richard John Guest
- Batting: Right-handed
- Bowling: Right-arm medium
- Relatives: Ernest Lucas Guest (grandfather); Ernest Melville Charles Guest (father); Ivor Forbes Guest (cousin)

Domestic team information
- Years: Team
- 1964–1966: Oxford University
- 1961–1966: Wiltshire
- 1964: Somerset 2nd XI
- First-class debut: 10 June 1964 Oxford University v Hampshire

Career statistics
Competition	First-class
Matches	23
Runs scored	576
Batting average	16.94
100s/50s	0/2
Top score	77
Balls bowled	1798
Wickets	22
Bowling average	40.09
5 wickets in innings	0
10 wickets in match	0
Best bowling	2/25
Catches/stumpings	10/–
- Source: CricketArchive, 11 March 2011

Melville Richard John Guest OBE (born 18 November 1943) is a British former diplomat and first-class cricketer.

He was born in what was then Salisbury, Southern Rhodesia, two weeks after the death of his father, Ernest Melville Charles Guest, a RAF pilot who was killed in action over the English Channel. He was educated at Rugby School and Magdalen College, Oxford,. At Rugby he was captain of both rugby and cricket and played for the English Public Schools in both sports. He gained an Exhibition to Magdalen where he played cricket for the University from 1964 to 1966 and earned a Blue. He also earned a Blue for Rackets, as captain of the Oxford Rackets team (1966), having been victorious in the Varsity match the previous year with J Q Greenstock as his partner (qv) against Howard Angus (qv) and M G Griffith (qv). In the Varsity Match of 1965, after Oxford lost three early wickets, Guest and his fellow batsman Mike Groves were barracked by the crowd for slow scoring, with 13 consecutive maiden overs bowled by the two Cambridge spinners. His highest score was 175 vs The Army (1965 - 3-day but not First Class)). He was elected President of Vincent's Club in 1966. In 2011 he chaired a committee of Vincent's alumni formed to celebrate the 150th anniversary of the Club and raised funds, inter alia, for an award scheme for scholar athletes, later becoming chair of the 'Trustees' (VATC).

He entered the Foreign and Commonwealth Office (FCO) in 1966, with a first posting to Tokyo in 1967, initially to learn Japanese. After a tour of duty in Paris, he temporarily left the FCO and was managing director of Lucas France from 1980 to 1985. He was then a director of the Channel Tunnel Group before returning to the FCO in Tokyo in 1986 as commercial counsellor. His last overseas posting was as political counsellor and consul general in Stockholm. He returned to the UK as head of the South Pacific department and then head of the South East Asia department. He left the FCO to become chief executive of Asia House, during which time he also took the role of executive director of the UK-Korea Forum for the Future and of the UK-Japan 21st Century Group. He was also the secretary/rapporteur of the UK-India Round Table. He was a senior advisor for corporate and external affairs to Imperial College, London, 2005–13.

He was appointed OBE in the 2007 Queen's Birthday Honours for services to Britain's relations with Asia. In the same year he received the official Commendation of the Japanese Foreign Minister for services to the UK's relations with Japan.
