= Richard Guest =

British artist (born 1967)

Richard Guest (born 14 August 1967) is an artist and short story author. Educated at the Slade School of Art 1986–1990, he began his writing career with two operas, The Swiss Admiral's Trousers (1986) and The Maginot Line (1987) which were staged at the Slade School of Fine Art and the Riverside Studios, Hammersmith respectively. Published works include Americancola^{2} *, A Lemming Named Desire, Stephen Milliner's Beautiful Rockery, and Minestrone. He was also co-owner, and publisher with Roy Marchant of RMG Books (1990–1998), a small press which published artists' books and poetry including Nature Poetry, and Adventures in the West by Christopher Twigg and Play by Andrew Bick *.
