= Ernest Melville Charles Guest =

Southern Rhodesian RAF pilot

Ernest Guest DFC
- Born: May 1920; Salisbury, Southern Rhodesia
- Died: 4 October 1943 (aged 23); Bay of Biscay
- Relatives: Ernest Lucas Guest (father); Melville Guest (son); Ivor Forbes Guest (cousin)
- Military career
- Allegiance: British Empire
- Branch: Royal Air Force
- Years of service: 1939–1943
- Rank: Flight Lieutenant
- Service number: 33501
- Units: No. 206 Squadron RAF; No. 200 Squadron RAF; No. 53 Squadron RAF
- Conflict: Second World War
- Awards: Distinguished Flying Cross

Ernest Melville Charles Guest DFC (May 1920 – 4 October 1943) was a Southern Rhodesian Royal Air Force pilot of the Second World War. He was awarded the Distinguished Flying Cross in 1942 having flown more than 1,000 operational hours. Posted to South Africa as a flight navigation instructor, he was unhappy and got himself transferred back to England on operational duties. He soon went missing in October 1943 after taking on six Ju 88s while on an anti-submarine sortie.

== Early life ==
Ernest 'Melville' Guest was born in Salisbury, Southern Rhodesia, in May 1920, one of the twin sons of Ernest Lucas Guest, a prominent Rhodesian politician. Before the outbreak of the Second World War, he was nominated by the Governor of Southern Rhodesia to be a Royal Air Force cadet at RAF College, Cranwell. He was granted a permanent commission as Pilot Officer in the General Duties Branch on 9 October 1939.

== Career ==
Shortly after he passed out of Cranwell, he returned home on leave to attend the wedding of his elder sister, Gwen, and a telegram addressed to him was included by mistake in the congratulatory telegrams read out at the reception. It read: "Return to England immediately and report to Air Ministry". He was posted to No. 206 Squadron RAF and flew a number of sorties over enemy territory. When Queen Wilhelmina of the Netherlands, along with Crown Princess Juliana and other members of the Dutch royal family fled to England in May 1940 aboard the British destroyer HMS Hereward, Guest was in the air escort that accompanied her to safety.

He was promoted to Flying Officer on 9 October 1940 and then Flight Lieutenant on 9 October 1941.

In the meantime, he was posted to the Gambia in June 1941 with No. 200 Squadron RAF, which was formed from a section of No. 206 Squadron. Later, he transferred to 61 Air School at George, Cape Province, South Africa, as a navigation instructor. He was unhappy at George and soon sought to return to operational duty.

Guest returned to England and joined No. 53 Squadron RAF in 1943, flying B-24 Liberator bombers from RAF Thorney Island on anti-submarine patrols over the Bay of Biscay. Soon after arriving in England, on 4 October 1943, his and another aircraft were sent out on patrol. They were attacked by six Ju 88s. The other aircraft sought the protection of the clouds, but Guest decided to fight it out. He did not return. He was pronounced missing in January 1944. Guest is commemorated on the Runnymede Memorial.

== Honours ==
As well as two Mentions in Despatches, he was awarded the Distinguished Flying Cross in 1942:

"This officer has now completed over 1,000 hours operational flying. His qualities of endurance are phenomenal, his ability as a pilot is exceptional, and his devotion to duty is of the highest order. All his work has been done quietly and efficiently. He has set an excellent example to the younger pilots of the Squadron."

== Family ==
Guest married Katherine Mary Hustler of Pannal, Yorkshire in Knaresborough in 1941. A few weeks after his death on 4 October 1943, she gave birth to their son, Melville, on 18 November.

== See also ==
- List of people who disappeared mysteriously at sea
