= Beechdale, Nottingham =

Suburban area in Nottingham, England

Coordinates: 52.962°N 1.201°W

Beechdale
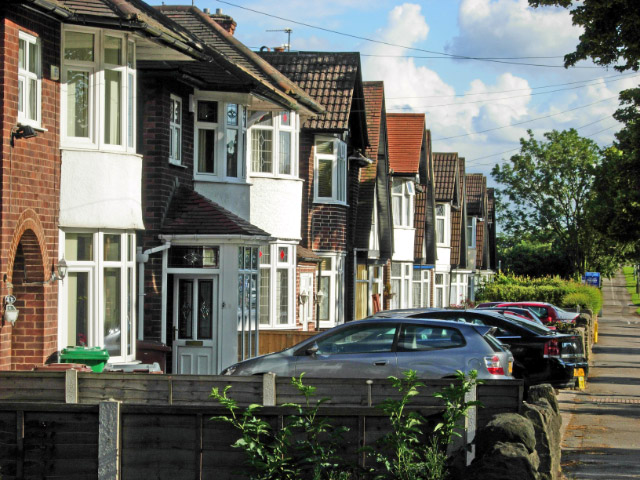
- Western Boulevard, Beechdale

- Location within Nottinghamshire
- Population: 5,537
- OS grid reference: SK 53662 40848
- District: City of Nottingham
- Shire county: Nottinghamshire
- Region: East Midlands
- Country: England
- Sovereign state: United Kingdom
- Post town: NOTTINGHAM
- Postcode district: NG8
- Dialling code: 0115
- Police: Nottinghamshire
- Fire: Nottinghamshire
- Ambulance: East Midlands
- UK Parliament: Nottingham South (UK Parliament constituency)

Beechdale is suburban area in the Nottingham. The area is located roughly 2.2 miles (3.5 km) from the city centre and surrounding areas include Bilborough to the west, Aspley to the north, Radford to the east and Wollaton to the south. At the 2001 Census, the area had a population of 5,537.

== Facilities ==
Most facilities in Beechdale are located on Hollington Road and Beechdale Road.

There are many schools in the Beechdale area, including the Bluecoat Beechdale Academy located off Harvey Road and Glenbrook Crescent, the Trinity Catholic School located off Beechdale Road and The Oakfield School and Sports College located next to Wigman Road as well as other primary and secondary schools in the area.

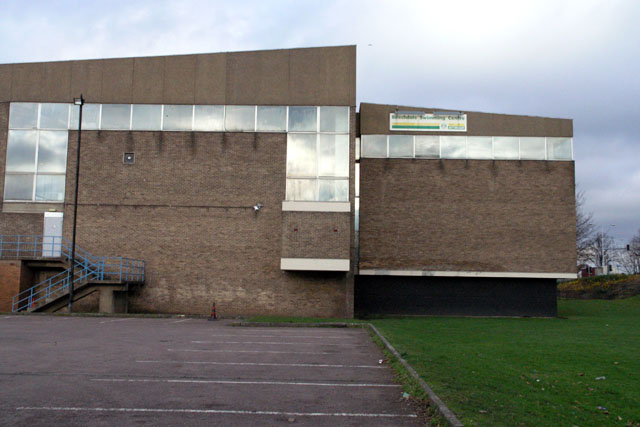
The Beechdale Swimming Centre was demolished in 2017

Previous facilities included the Beechdale Swimming Centre and the Hoods Hideout Soft Play which was known as Beechdale Baths. The centre opened in the 1970s, and was the swimming centre where Rebecca Adlington spent her training. The centre closed down in August 2015 as the council opened the Harvey Hadden Sports Village in Bilborough, and the centre was eventually demolished in early 2017.

Other facilities in the area included a post office, a community centre and a day centre located off Ambergate Road, as well as a small bowling alley located off Beechdale Road.

== Demographics ==
According to the data of the 2001 Census, the area has a population of 5,537, and a majority of the population are aged 25–44 who make up 22.8% of the population.

The census also shows that 82.9% of the population is White British, as well as 1.4% being White Irish and 2.3% being classed as Other White. 1.6% of the population is Mixed Race, 8.6% is Asian or Asian British and 2.1% is Black or Black British. 0.4% of the population is Chinese and other ethnic groups make up 0.1% of the estate's population.

== Religion ==
The 2001 Census shows that 67.3% of the population are Christian and Atheists make up 13.8% of the population. 5.5% of the population are Muslim, 3.1% are Sikh and 0.8% are Hindu. 0.2% of the population are Buddhist, 0.1% are Jewish, other religions make up 0.1% of the population and 9.2% did not state their religion.

== Bus services ==
There are frequent bus services operated by Nottingham City Transport as well as a couple Locallink Services operated by Nottingham Community Transport.

Bus services in Beechdale, Nottingham
Bus operator	Line	Destination(s)	Notes
Nottingham City Transport	28	Nottingham → Ilkeston Road → Jubilee Campus → Beechdale → Bilborough	
Nottingham City Transport	53	Arnold → Daybrook → City Hospital → Basford → Western Boulevard → Beechdale → Jubilee Campus → QMC → Showcase Cinemas → Clifton	
Nottingham City Transport	53B	Daybrook → City Hospital → Basford → Western Boulevard → Beechdale → Jubilee Campus → QMC → Showcase Cinemas → Clifton	
Nottingham City Transport	A1	Basford → Bulwell → Snape Wood → Nuthall Road → Trinity/Bluecoat/Nottingham Academy	
Nottingham City Transport	A2	Bestwood Park → Edwards Lane → Ring Road → Trinity/Bluecoat/Nottingham Academy	
Nottingham City Transport	N28	Nottingham → Jubilee Campus → Beechdale → Bilborough → Wollaton Vale	Line serves at night only.
Nottingham Community Transport	L3	Nottingham → QMC → Beechdale → Bilborough → Strelley	
Nottingham Community Transport	L4	Nottingham → Radford → Ainsley Estate → Beechdale → Aspley	
Silverdale Tours	S34	Ainsley Estate → Beechdale → Strelley → Broxtowe → Aspley → Cinderhill → Bulwell	
