= Cinderhill =

Area of Nottingham, England

Coordinates: 52.985°N 1.204°W

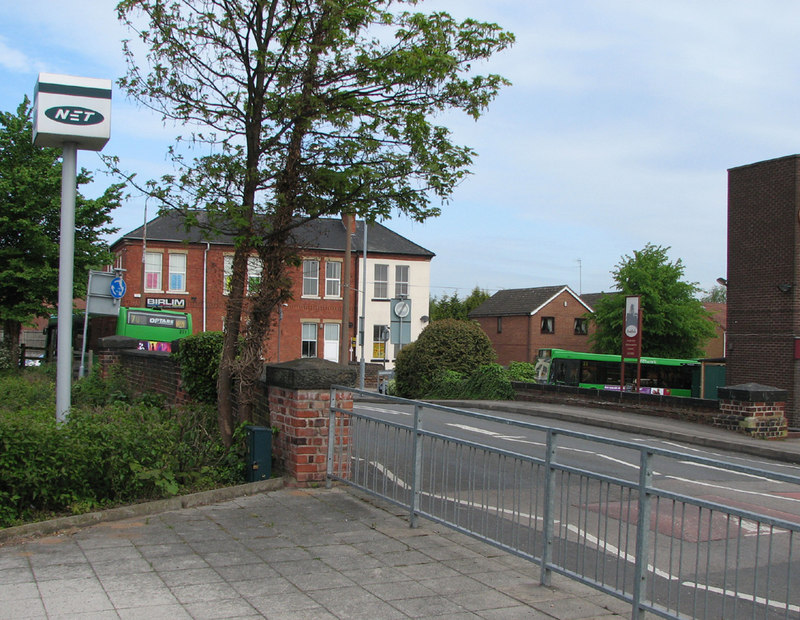
- Cinderhill Tram Stop

- Location within Nottinghamshire
- Population: 2,959
- OS grid reference: SK 53432 43404
- District: City of Nottingham
- Shire county: Nottinghamshire
- Region: East Midlands
- Country: England
- Sovereign state: United Kingdom
- Post town: NOTTINGHAM
- Postcode district: NG6 / NG8
- Dialling code: 0115
- Police: Nottinghamshire
- Fire: Nottinghamshire
- Ambulance: East Midlands
- UK Parliament: Nottingham North and Kimberley

Cinderhill is an area in the City of Nottingham. It is located roughly 3.1 miles (5.0 km) from the City Centre, and surrounding areas include Bulwell to the north, Aspley and Broxtowe to the south, Basford to the east and Nuthall to the west.

Cinderhill lies within two city wards; the northern part of Cinderhill lies within the Basford ward, which includes the Phoenix Park branch as well as many facilities. The southern part lies within the Aspley ward, which mainly consists of council housing that was constructed in the 1930s, and is widely known by the locals as the Bell's Lane Estate. According to the 2001 Census, the estate had a population of 2,959.

== Facilities ==
Many of Cinderhill's facilities are located on Nuthall Road. Facilities include a gym, an Iceland store, as well as a KFC and a Tesco Express store with a petrol station included.

Other facilities include the Rosslyn Park Primary and Nursery School located off Amesbury Circus, a One Stop convenience store, a Fish Bar and a take away located off Bell's Lane, and the Double Tree by Hilton Hotel off Nuthall and Cinderhill Road.

== Demographics ==
According to the 2001 Census, the estate had a population of 2,959, and a majority of the population are aged 25–44, who make up 29.9% of the estate's population.

The census also shows that 88.4% of the population is White British, as well as 0.9% being White Irish and 1.7% being classed as Other White. 3.0% of the population is Mixed Race, 2.5% is Asian or Asian British and 2.8% is Black or Black British. 0.3% of the population is Chinese and other ethnic groups make up 0.2% of the estate's population.

== Religion ==
The 2001 Census shows that 54.3% of the population are Christian and Atheists make up 30.8% of the estate's population. 2.2% of the population are Muslim, 0.5% are Hindu and 0.2% are Sikh. Buddhism and Judaism each score 0.1%, other religions make up 0.5% of the estate's population and 11.3% of the population did not state their religion.

== Industry ==
Between 1841 and 1986, Cinderhill was the location of Babbington Colliery.

== Transport ==
=== Tram ===
The Cinderhill tram stop has a single platform as well as a single track, and has frequent services from Phoenix Park to Clifton South as part of NET's Line 2 service.

Preceding station	NET	Following station
Phoenix Park Terminus	Line 2	Highbury Vale towards Clifton South

Nottingham Express Transit

■ 2: Clifton South → Clifton → Wilford Lane → Railway Station → Nottingham → The Forest → Wilkinson Street → Highbury Vale → Cinderhill → Phoenix Park

=== Bus services ===
Nottingham City Transport

■ 35: Nottingham → Derby Road → QMC → University Park → Wollaton Vale → Bilborough → Strelley → Cinderhill → Bulwell

■ 70: Nottingham → Sherwood Rise → Basford → Cinderhill (Bagnall Road) → Bulwell → Bulwell Morrisons

■ 70B: Nottingham → Sherwood Rise → Basford → Cinderhill (Bagnall Road) → Bulwell

■ 71: Nottingham → Sherwood Rise → Basford → Cinderhill → Bulwell → Bulwell Morrisons

■ 71B: Nottingham → Sherwood Rise → Basford → Cinderhill → Bulwell

■ 77C: Nottingham → Alfreton Road → Aspley Lane → Strelley → Cinderhill

■ 79: Nottingham → Alfreton Road → Nuthall Road → Cinderhill → Bulwell → Rise Park → Warren Hill → Bestwood Park → Arnold

■ 79B: Nottingham → Alfreton Road → Nuthall Road → Cinderhill → Bulwell / Rise Park

Trentbarton

■ rainbow one: Nottingham → Cinderhill → Nuthall → Kimberley → Eastwood → Heanor / Ripley / Alfreton

CT4N

■ L4: Nottingham → Radford → Ainsley Estate → Beechdale → Aspley → Cinderhill

Silverdale Tours

■ S34: Ainsley Estate → Beechdale → Strelley → Broxtowe → Aspley → Cinderhill → Bulwell
