= List of schools in Nottingham =

This is a list of schools in the city of Nottingham, in the English county of Nottinghamshire.

== State-funded schools ==
Source: Nottingham City Council

=== Primary schools ===
- Ambleside Primary School
- Berridge Primary School
- Blessed Robert Widmerpool RC Primary School
- Blue Bell Hill Primary School
- Bluecoat Bentinck Primary Academy
- Bluecoat Primary Academy
- Brocklewood Primary School
- Bulwell St Mary's Primary School
- Burford Primary School
- Cantrell Primary School
- Carrington Primary School
- Claremont Primary School
- Crabtree Farm Primary School
- Djanogly Northgate Academy
- Djanogly Sherwood Academy
- Djanogly Strelley Academy
- Dovecote Primary School
- Dunkirk Primary School
- Edale Rise Primary School
- Edna G Olds Academy
- Fernwood Primary School
- Firbeck Academy
- Forest Fields Primary School
- Glade Hill Primary School
- The Glapton Academy
- Glenbrook Primary School
- Greenfields Community School
- Haydn Primary School
- Heathfield Primary School
- Hempshill Hall Primary School
- Henry Whipple Primary School
- Highbank Primary School
- Hogarth Academy
- Huntingdon Academy
- Jubilee LEAD Academy
- Melbury Primary School
- Mellers Primary School
- Middleton Primary School
- The Milford Academy
- Nottingham Academy
- Old Basford School
- Our Lady & St Edward RC Primary Academy
- Our Lady of Perpetual Succour RC Primary School
- Portland Spencer Academy
- Radford Primary School Academy
- Rise Park Primary School
- Robert Shaw Primary School
- Robin Hood Primary School
- Rosslyn Park Primary School
- Rufford Primary School
- St Ann's Well Academy
- St Augustine's RC Primary School
- St Margaret Clitherow RC Primary School
- St Mary's RC Primary School
- St Patrick's RC Primary School
- St Teresa's RC Primary School
- Scotholme Primary School
- Seely Primary School
- Snape Wood Primary School
- Sneinton St Stephen's CE Primary School
- South Wilford Endowed CE Primary School
- Southglade Primary School
- Southwark Primary School
- Southwold Primary School
- Springfield Academy
- Stanstead Primary School
- Sycamore Academy
- Victoria Primary School
- Walter Halls Primary School
- Warren Primary Academy
- Welbeck Primary School
- Westglade Primary School
- Whitegate Primary School
- Whitemoor Academy
- William Booth Primary School
- Windmill LEAD Academy

=== Secondary schools ===
- The Arnold Hill Spencer Academy
- Bluecoat Aspley Academy
- Bluecoat Beechdale Academy
- Bluecoat Trent Academy
- Bluecoat Wollaton Academy
- The Bulwell Academy
- Djanogly City Academy
- Ellis Guilford School
- Farnborough Spencer Academy
- Fernwood School
- Nottingham Academy
- The Nottingham Emmanuel School
- Nottingham Free School
- Nottingham Girls' Academy
- Nottingham University Academy of Science and Technology
- Nottingham University Samworth Academy
- The Oakwood Academy
- Park Vale Academy
- Trinity Catholic School
- The Wells Academy
- The Carlton Academy

=== Special and alternative schools ===
- CP Riverside School
- Denewood Academy
- Hospital and Home Education PRU
- Nethergate Academy
- Oak Field School
- Rosehill School
- Stone Soup Academy
- Unity Academy
- Westbury Academy
- Woodlands Academy

=== Further education ===
- Bilborough College
- Nottingham College
- Confetti Institute of Creative Technologies

== Independent schools ==
=== Primary and preparatory schools ===
- Fig Tree Primary School
- Green Crescent Primary School
- Iona School (closed September 2024)
- St Joseph's School

=== Senior and all-through schools ===
- Hollygirt School
- Jamia Al-Hudaa
- Nottingham Girls' High School
- Nottingham High School

=== Special and alternative schools ===
- FUEL
- Sutherland House School
- Take 1 Learning Centre
