= Listed buildings in Nottingham =

The listed buildings in the city of Nottingham are arranged by wards as follows:

- Listed buildings in Nottingham (Aspley ward)
- Listed buildings in Nottingham (Basford ward)
- Listed buildings in Nottingham (Berridge ward)
- Listed buildings in Nottingham (Bilborough ward)
- Listed buildings in Nottingham (Bridge ward)
- Listed buildings in Nottingham (Bulwell ward)
- Listed buildings in Nottingham (Bulwell Forest ward)
- Listed buildings in Nottingham (Clifton North ward)
- Listed buildings in Nottingham (Clifton South ward)
- Listed buildings in Nottingham (Dale ward)
- Listed buildings in Nottingham (Dunkirk and Lenton ward)
- Listed buildings in Nottingham (Hyson Green and Arboretum ward)
- Listed buildings in Nottingham (Mapperley ward)
- Listed buildings in Nottingham (Porchester ward)
- Listed buildings in Nottingham (Radford and Park ward)
- Listed buildings in Nottingham (Sherwood ward)
- Listed buildings in Nottingham (St Ann's ward)
- Listed buildings in Nottingham (Wollaton East and Lenton Abbey ward)
- Listed buildings in Nottingham (Wollaton West ward)
