= Radford, Nottingham =

Area of Nottingham, England

Coordinates: 52.960°N 1.177°W

Radford
- Suburb
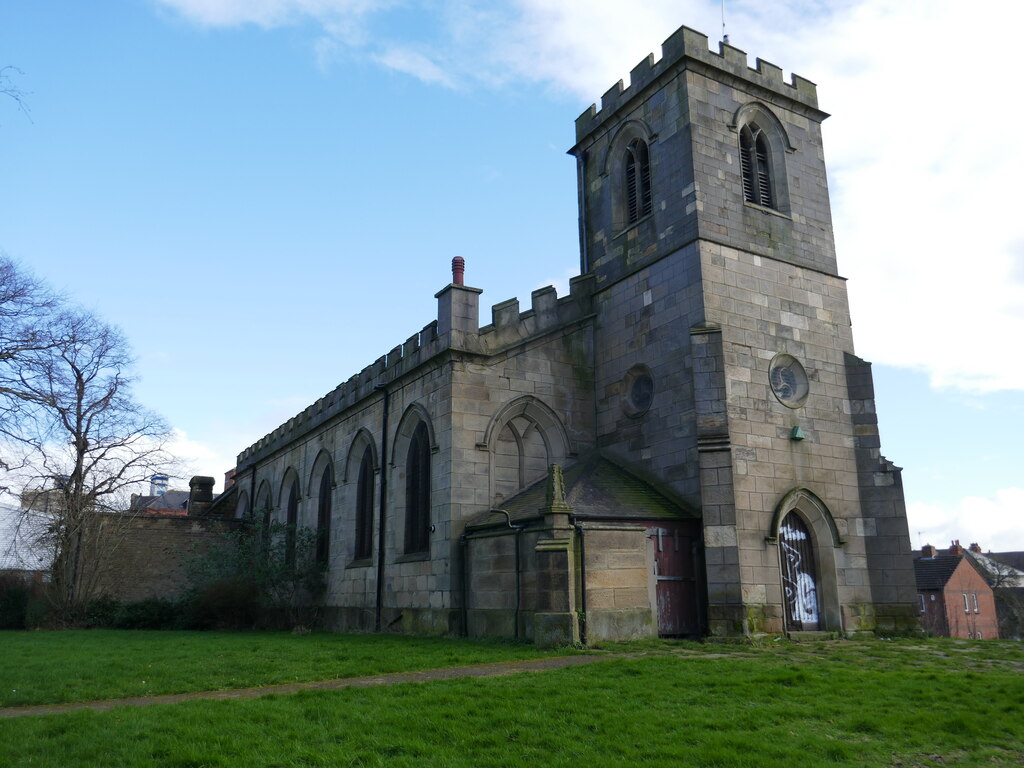
- St Peter's Church

- Location within Nottinghamshire
- Population: 21,414 (Ward 2011)
- OS grid reference: SK 55277 40643
- Unitary authority: Nottingham
- Ceremonial county: Nottinghamshire
- Region: East Midlands
- Country: England
- Sovereign state: United Kingdom
- Post town: NOTTINGHAM
- Postcode district: NG7
- Dialling code: 0115
- Police: Nottinghamshire
- Fire: Nottinghamshire
- Ambulance: East Midlands
- UK Parliament: Nottingham South

Radford is an inner-city suburb of Nottingham and former civil parish in the Nottingham district, in the ceremonial county of Nottinghamshire, England, located just outside the city centre. The appropriate ward of the City of Nottingham Council is Radford and Park which, in 2011, had a population of 21,414. It is bounded to the south by Lenton and to the east by Nottingham city centre, and comprises around 600 acres (240 ha) of land.

== History ==
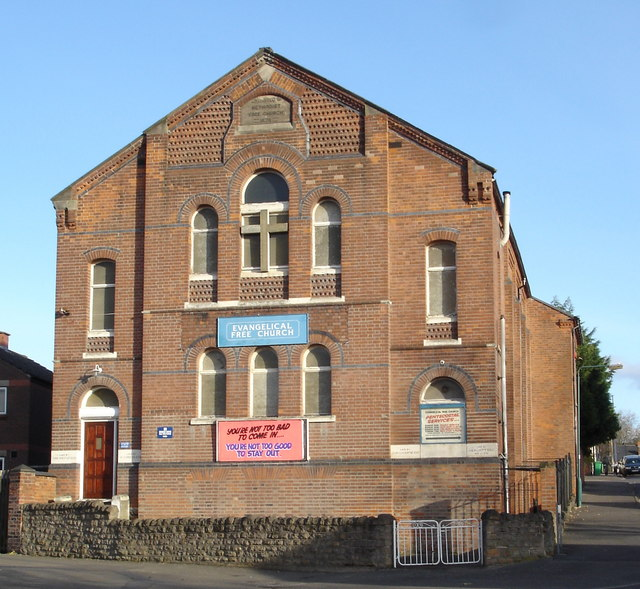
Evangelical Free Church

St Peter's Church, Radford was given by William Peveril to Lenton Priory. The church was rebuilt in 1812 at a cost of £2,000. A Wesleyan chapel was built in 1805 and enlarged in 1828. In September 1878 a chapel was built on St Peter's Street by the United Methodist Free Churches at a cost of £1,900. It was closed owing to declining membership and income in June 1947 and purchased by the Evangelical Free Church.

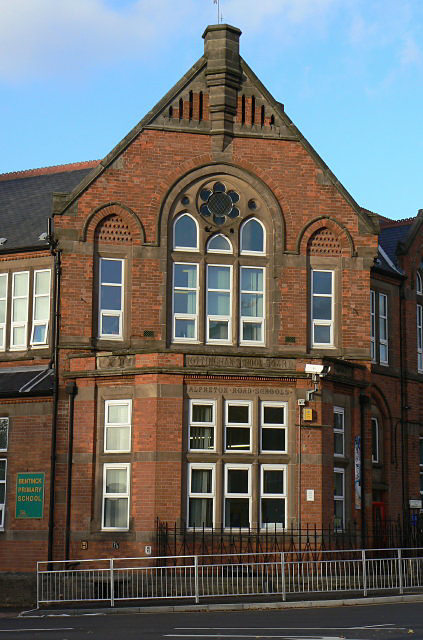
Bentinck Primary School

Bentinck Road School opened on 19 November 1880, and was formerly called the Alfreton Road Board School.

Radford Registration District (RD) was created on 1 July 1837 on the introduction of Statutory Registration of Births, Marriages and Deaths (BMD) – and was abolished, and absorbed into Nottingham RD, on 1 July 1880.

In 1891 the parish had a population of 38,718. On 1 April 1897 the parish was abolished and merged with Nottingham.

== Background ==
The area has a large ethnic minority population (mainly European, West Indian, African, Arab, Asian, South American, Polish and increasingly Kurdish), and accordingly there are a large number of specialist food and retail shops catering to specific cultures, owing to the relatively cheap nature of housing in the area (and the large number of old Victorian properties converted into flats and bedsits).

In 2021 residents reported that the crime rate was high, although Amy English, neighbourhood policing inspector for the Radford area, said "As a result of this work we have seen a reduction in recorded crime, including robbery and burglary, in the Radford and Park neighbourhood."

Radford has a large student population, most of whom attend the nearby Nottingham Trent University and University of Nottingham.

== Industry ==
Radford was the home of

- Raleigh Industries, once the world's largest bicycle producer
- Player's cigarettes, with a range of buildings housing factories, offices and warehouses
- Manlove, Alliott & Co. Ltd., inventors of incinerators for waste disposal.

== Culture ==
Radford provides the backdrop for much of Alan Sillitoe's book 1958 Saturday Night and Sunday Morning. Numerous scenes from the 1960 film of the book which starred Albert Finney, playing Raleigh worker Arthur Seaton, were shot in Radford. In 2009 a 1982 recording of Finney, talking about the making of the film, was released on DVD.

== 2023 Nottingham attacks ==
At 4:00 am on 13 June 2023, two 19-year-olds were found stabbed to death in Ilkeston Road. The victims were first-year students at the University of Nottingham. The suspect is a 31-year-old dual Guinea-Bissau/Portuguese national. He has settled status through his Portuguese citizenship and was previously a student at the University of Nottingham in 2022. At about 5:30 am, Nottinghamshire Police tasered the man outside a convenience store in Bentinck Road, Forest Fields and arrested him on suspicion of murder. He had no criminal record and was not known to the security services, but had a history of mental health issues. On 16 June 2023 the suspect was charged with three counts of murder and three counts of attempted murder.

== Bus services ==
Nottingham City Transport

■ 28: Nottingham → Radford (Ilkeston Road) → Jubilee Campus → Beechdale → Bilborough

■ 30: Nottingham → Radford (Ilkeston Road) → Jubilee Campus → Wollaton Park → Bramcote → Wollaton Vale

■ 77: Nottingham → Radford (Alfreton Road) → Aspley Lane → Strelley

■ 77C: Nottingham → Radford (Alfreton Road) → Aspley Lane → Strelley → Cinderhill

■ 78: Nottingham → Radford (Alfreton Road) → Nuthall Road → Broxtowe → Strelley

■ 79: Nottingham → Radford (Alfreton Road) → Nuthall Road → Cinderhill → Bulwell → Rise Park → Warren Hill → Bestwood Park → Arnold

■ 79B: Nottingham → Radford (Alfreton Road) → Nuthall Road → Cinderhill → Bulwell / Rise Park

Trentbarton

■ rainbow one: Nottingham → Radford (Alfreton Road) → Nuthall → Kimberley → Eastwood → Heanor / Ripley / Alfreton

■ two: Nottingham → Radford (Ilkeston Road) → Wollaton → Trowell → Ilkeston → Cotmanhay

CT4N

■ L4: Nottingham → Radford → Ainsley Estate → Beechdale → Aspley

■ L14: Nottingham → Radford → Hyson Green → Bulwell
