= William Crane Comprehensive School =

School in Nottingham, England

Coordinates: 52.97643°N 1.20207°W

William Crane School, Minver Crescent, Aspley, Nottingham, Nottingham NG8 5PN, was a school consisting of infants, juniors and seniors. The school was built in 1930 and was closed in 2003 and subsequently demolished. In its last year the school finished joint bottom of the GCSE league tables.

== Location ==
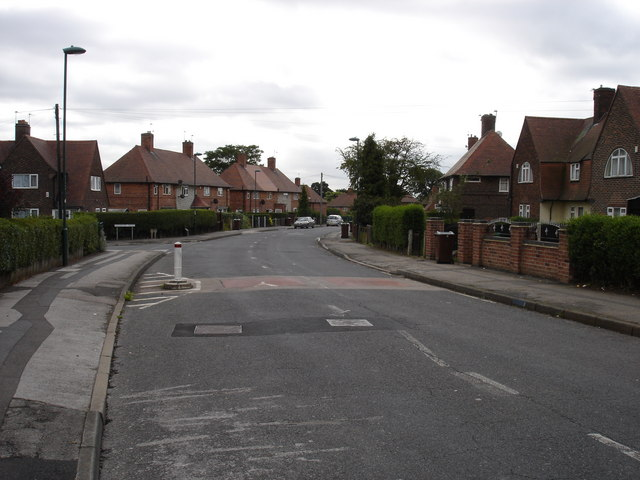
Local housing on Minver Crescent

It was built on a circular format with a sports playing field in the middle. It consisted originally of four wings, north, south, east and west, each with its own entrance onto Minver Crescent. The North and South sides consisted of both Ambleside Infants/Juniors and Rosslyn Infants/Junior schools. The East and West were a single senior school connected by paths around the playing field.

== History ==
The William Crane Comprehensive School which was opened in 1930 struggled to provide the required metrics and in 1999 finished joint bottom in the GCSE league tables, with only 4% of the 104 pupils being awarded with five GCSEs A-Cs. William Crane eventually went onto close in 2003.

In an interview with The Guardian, Russell Andrews, assistant director of education at Nottingham city council, explained "What we've got is a multi-layered set of social problems -social unrest where the school is, low morale among staff, low expectations, low input among parents. Had we taken a multi-layered approach to solving the problems five years ago it might have been different."

Head teacher from around 1998 until it closed in 2003 was Godfrey Davey.

Since the closure of William Crane, the one remaining primary school in the area is currently Ambleside Primary School.

In 2012, according to research performed by the University of Nottingham only one in eight children in Bulwell, Aspley, Nottingham, Bilborough, Broxtowe Estate, Basford, Nottinghamshire and Bestwood went on to university, just 13% compared to a national average of 34%.
