= Strelley, Nottingham =

Housing estate in Nottingham, England

Coordinates: 52.976°N 1.229°W

Strelley
- Suburb
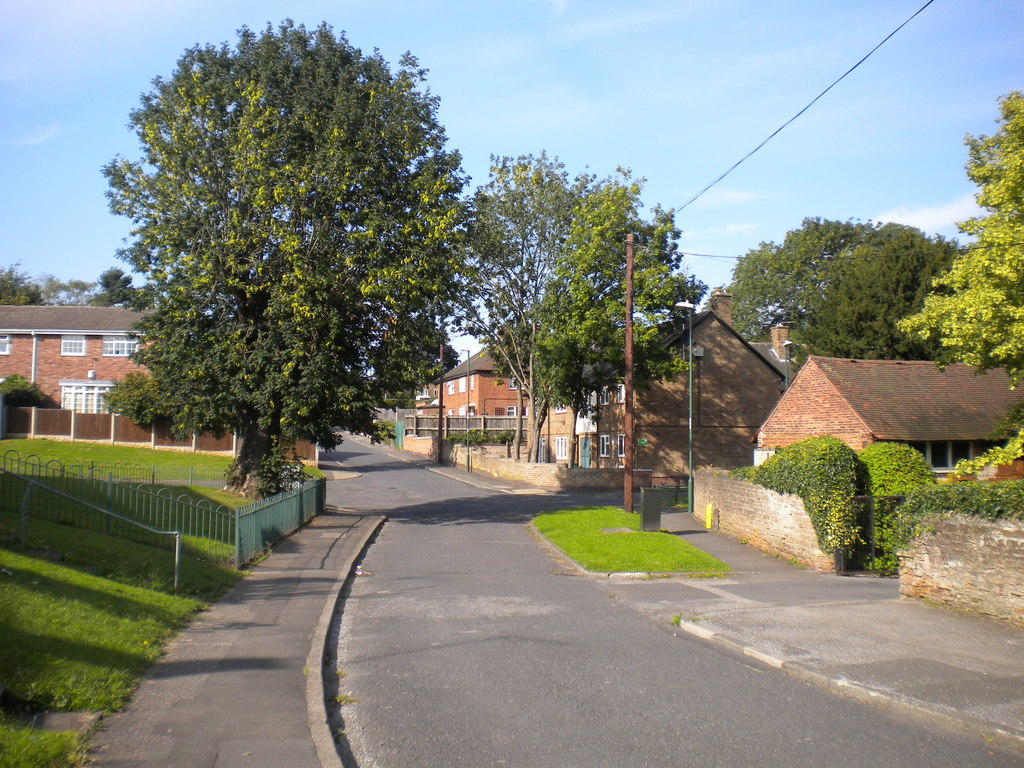
- St Martins Road

- Location within Nottinghamshire
- Population: 2,561
- OS grid reference: SK 51765 42384
- Unitary authority: Nottingham
- Ceremonial county: Nottinghamshire
- Region: East Midlands
- Country: England
- Sovereign state: United Kingdom
- Post town: NOTTINGHAM
- Postcode district: NG8
- Dialling code: 0115
- Police: Nottinghamshire
- Fire: Nottinghamshire
- Ambulance: East Midlands
- UK Parliament: Nottingham North and Kimberley

Strelley Estate is a post war housing estate and suburb located in the Bilborough ward in the City of Nottingham. The estate is located around 3.5 miles (6 km) from the city centre and lies west of the Broxtowe Estate, south of Nuthall, east of the Strelley Village and north of Bilborough. At the 2001 census, the estate had a population of 2,561.

== Facilities ==
The Strelley Estate has a number of facilities located on Strelley Road including an Asda supermarket, The Rose Inn, a police station and a recreation ground next to the A6002 road, and there is a fish bar, a Premier convenience store and a chemist located on Flamsteed Road. Other facilities include the Djanogly Strelley Academy off Cranwell Road.

The Strelley Estate also includes the Nottingham Business Park and a tiny portion of the M1. The Nottingham Belfry hotel is located next to the business park, as well as newly built housing around Princess Boulevard.

== Demographics ==
According to the 2001 census data, the estate has a population of 2,561. A majority of the population is aged 25–44 who make up 29.2% of the population. The census also shows that 91.8% of the population is White British, as well as 0.9% being White Irish and 0.8% being classed as Other White. 3.1% of the population is Mixed Race, 1.0% is Asian or Asian British and 2.2% is Black or Black British.

== Religion ==
The 2001 census shows that 65.8% of the estate's population are Christian and Atheists make up 23% of the population. 0.7% of the population practice Hinduism, and Islam, Sikhism and Buddhism each score 0.5%. 8.8% of the population did not state their religion. Strelley has The Ark Church located on Strelley Road, and Kingdom Hall of Jehovah's Witnesses Church on Flamsteed Road.

== Transport ==
Nottingham City Transport

■ 35: Nottingham → Derby Road → QMC → University Park → Wollaton Vale → Bilborough → Strelley → Bulwell

■ 35B: Nottingham → Derby Road → QMC → University Park → Wollaton Vale → Bilborough → Strelley

■ 77: Nottingham → Alfreton Road → Aspley Lane → Strelley

■ 77C: Nottingham → Alfreton Road → Aspley Lane → Strelley → Cinderhill

■ 78: Nottingham → Alfreton Road → Nuthall Road → Broxtowe → Strelley

CT4N

■ L2: Nottingham → Derby Road → QMC → Wollaton → Bilborough → Strelley (Nottingham Business Park) → Assarts Farm Estate

■ L4: Nottingham → Derby Road → Beechdale → Bilborough → Strelley
