= Maximillian White =

British-Jamaican entrepreneur (born 1980)

- Born: 1980 (age 45–46); Radford, Nottingham, United Kingdom
- Occupation: Entrepreneur
- Known for: Ventures in real estate, music, hospitality, and the medical cannabis industry
- Children: 4

Maximillian White (born 1980) is a British-Jamaican entrepreneur based in Dubai, UAE. He is known for his ventures in real estate, music, hospitality, and the medical cannabis industry.

== Early life and career ==
White was born in 1980 in Radford, Nottingham. He began his career as a landlord, later expanding into the music industry as a record company manager.

White also entered the hospitality sector, founding the Blanco Beach Club, a beach club in Portimão, Portugal.

== Business ventures ==
White is the founder of a medical cannabis farm in Portugal, which is one of the largest medical cannabis farms in Europe.

In 2024, he launched Dr. Green NFT, a blockchain-based platform integrating the cannabis industry with digital assets.
