= Paul McMahon =

English cricketer

Paul Joseph McMahon (born 12 March 1983) is an English cricketer. He is a right-handed batsman and a right-arm offbreak bowler.

McMahon has represented Nottinghamshire in first-class cricket since 2002. Between 2002 and 2005, he also studied for a law degree at Oxford University, captaining the University cricket team in his last two years.

McMahon was educated at The Trinity School, Nottingham and was the England Under-19s captain in the 2002 series against India.
