= Jane Denton =

Jane Denton, CBE, FRCN, (born 30 June 1953) is a United Kingdom nurse and midwife notable for her contributions to fertility nursing and genetics. She was made a Fellow of the Royal College of Nursing in 2006.

== Early life ==
She attended the Nottingham Bluecoat Grammar School (now the Nottingham Bluecoat Academy).

== Career ==
She was a contributor to the development of the UK's first IVF programme. She served as nursing director of the Hallam Medical Centre, and was a founder member of the RCN Fertility Nurse Group that lobbied for the development of the current Human Fertilisation and Embryology Authority (HFEA) Act.

In 1992 she was named the first nurse appointed to the HFEA, which regulates and inspects all UK clinics providing IVF, donor insemination or the storage of eggs, sperm or embryos.

In her current role as Director of the Multiple Births Foundation, she has contributed to significant change in public and professional perception and attitudes towards multiple births.

== Honours ==
She was appointed a CBE in the Queen's Birthday Honours List in June 2007 for services to health care.
