= St Margaret's Church, Aspley =

Church in Nottingham, England

Coordinates: 52°58′10″N 01°11′49″W

St. Margaret's Church, Aspley
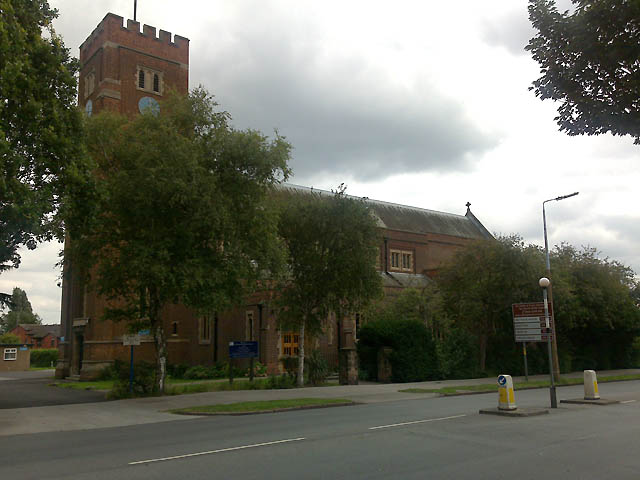
- St. Margaret's Church, Aspley
- Denomination: Church of England
- Churchmanship: Evangelical
- Website: wearewoven.church/stmargs

History
- Dedication: St. Margaret

Administration
- Province: York
- Diocese: Southwell and Nottingham
- Parish: Aspley, Nottingham

Clergy
- Vicar(s): Revd. Rich Atkinson and Revd. Emmie Walford

St. Margaret's Church, Aspley is a parish church in the Church of England in Aspley, Nottingham.

== History ==
St Margaret's was built in 1936 by E. H. Heazell.

In 2018, St Margaret's was designated a "resourcing church" and welcomed a new vicar.

== Organ ==
The pipe organ was installed by Rushworth and Dreaper in 1936. The organ has since been removed.
