= Melbourne Park (Nottingham) =

Coordinates: 52.973°N 1.192°W

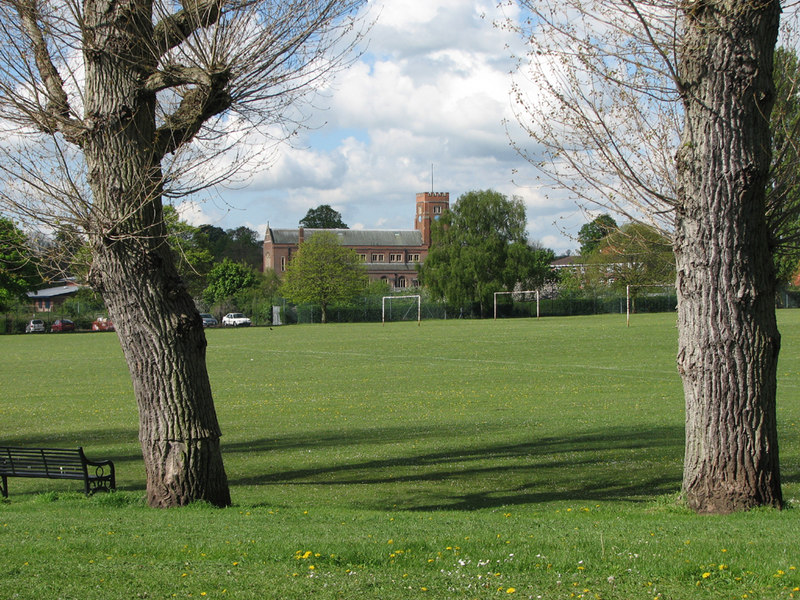
Melbourne Park

Melbourne Park is a large public space in Aspley, Nottingham, England. The park is approximately 500 by 600 metres (1,600 by 2,000 ft). In addition to public greenspace, the site has a number of football pitches which are used for Sunday league football matches. There are many football teams around this area.

The park contains a variety of trees, including lombardy poplars around the playing area, a row of black poplars and a variety of large trees around the perimeter.

== History ==
The Aspley area of the city was developed quite rapidly. In 1915 the area was fields and scattered housing. By 1930 the area had either been developed for housing uses or land had been set aside for those purposes.

By 1936 the site of the park was one of the few parcels of land remaining undeveloped or not earmarked for housing or other uses. The Corporation of Nottingham Housing Department obtained funding from the Department of Health to lay out the majority of the present park as a public recreation ground. The portion of the present park around the Aspley Boys Club was developed by Nottingham City Transport as their recreation ground. Until c.1950 this section was distinct from the remainder of the park.

In 1989 Nottinghamshire County Council proposed plans to develop the park as the new site for William Crane School (now closed). This proposal was resisted and formally prevented by a motion of the Nottingham City Council in September 1990. From 2005 until September 2021, the park was the site of the Nottinghamshire YMCA's Youth and Community Centre. The centre was closed due to increases in the rent by the city council as part of a series of closures and measures meant to save £38 million over the following four years.
