= Bluecoat Wollaton Academy =

Location
- Sutton Passeys Crescent, Wollaton; Nottingham, Nottinghamshire, NG8 1EA; England
- Coordinates: 52.9517°N 1.1985°W

Information
- Type: Academy
- Motto: Believe in yourself, in others, in God
- Religious affiliation: Church of England
- Local authority: Nottingham City Council
- Oversight: Diocese of Southwell and Nottingham
- Trust: Archway Learning Trust
- Department for Education URN: 145146 Tables
- Ofsted: Reports
- Principal: Cath Rowell
- Gender: Mixed
- Age range: 11–16
- Enrolment: 822 (2024)
- Website: www.bluecoatwollaton.co.uk

Bluecoat Wollaton Academy is an 11–16 mixed, Church of England, secondary school with academy status in Wollaton, Nottingham, Nottinghamshire, England. It is part of the Archway Learning Trust and is located in the Diocese of Southwell and Nottingham.

== History ==
Originally known as Margaret Glen-Bott School, in 2003 the school was 'twinned' with The Nottingham Bluecoat School and Technology College in the Aspley area of Nottingham. In July 2004 the schools formally merged, with the former Margaret Glen-Bott School being then known as the Wollaton Park Campus. The combined school then shared resources such as administration and senior leadership. In 2009 it was announced that the Wollaton Park Campus was to be closed, however due to a lack of funds, the plans were ultimately scrapped.

In January 2012, the combined school converted to academy status and was renamed Bluecoat Academy. In September 2013 expansion projects totalling approximately £14 million were started on the Wollaton Park Campus.

In October 2017, the Wollaton Park Campus formally demerged from Bluecoat Academy and was renamed Bluecoat Wollaton Academy. the Aspley Campus of the school was renamed Bluecoat Aspley Academy.
