= Anisah Osman Britton =

British tech entrepreneur

Anisah Osman Britton MBE
- Born: 1993 (age 32–33); London, England
- Occupation: Tech entrpreneur

Anisah Osman Britton (born 1993) is a British tech entrepreneur. She is one of the youngest people to be appointed a Member of the Order of the British Empire (MBE) in the 2023 New Year Honours. She received the honour for her contributions to Diversity in the Technology Sector.

In 2019, she was featured on the Forbes 30 Under 30 list for her work as a social entrepreneur. In the same year, she was included in the Financial Times list of "100 Bame leaders influencing the tech sector".

== Early life ==
Osman Britton was born to a Punjabi Indian mother and a white English father in London in 1993. Her family moved to Spain when she was three years old, and then India when she was 11. She attended Bilborough Sixth Form College in Nottingham.

== Professional life ==
At 2012, at the age of 19, Anisah Osman Britton founded her first company, Pockitmuni.

In 2016, at the age of 26, she co-founded a coding school for women and minority genders called 23 Code Street. Profits from 23 Code Street are put towards teaching disadvantaged women from the slums in India how to code. Her work with 23 Code Street saw her nominated as a finalist for the 2017 Precious Awards.

In 2018, Osman Britton became one of the Directors of Backstage Capital, an accelerator and fund that backs underrepresented founders. From December 2020 to November 2023, she was one of the trustees of Social Tech Trust.

She is the co-author of a newsletter called Startup Life, published in Sifted, in which she writes about what it takes to build a business. She is also the author of Brown Bodies, a platform that explores love and sex in the South Asian disapora.
