= Listed buildings in Nottingham (Aspley ward) =

Aspley is an electoral ward in the city of Nottingham, England. The ward contains three listed buildings that are recorded in the National Heritage List for England. All the listed buildings are designated at Grade II, the lowest of the three grades, which is applied to "buildings of national importance and special interest". The ward is to the northwest of the centre of the city, and is mainly residential. The listed buildings consist of a house, a church, and a war memorial in the churchyard.

== Buildings ==
Name and location	Photograph	Date	Notes
The Elms; 52.98533°N 1.20056°W	—	Late 18th century	The house is in red brick with roofs of slate and tile. There are three storeys and attics, and three bays, with a full-length extension to the ground floor containing a gabled porch, and a rear lean-to with a pantile roof. The windows are casements, one with six lights, and some with segmental heads.
Christ Church, Cinderhill; 52.98360°N 1.19716°W		1855–56	The church was designed by T. C. Hine in Gothic Revival style, and the choir vestry was added in 1902. The church is built in Bulwell stone with slate roofs, and consists of a nave, a north aisle, a south porch, a chancel, a vestry and organ chamber, and an octagonal choir vestry. At the southwest corner is an octagonal bell turret containing two lancet windows and eight gabled bell openings, surmounted by an octagonal spire with a weathercock.
War memorial 52.98367°N 1.19690°W		c. 1918	The war memorial is in the churchyard of Christ Church, Cinderhill, to the east of the church. It is in stone, and consists of a Celtic cross on a tapering square shaft, on a tapering pedestal, on a square base of three steps. On three sides of the pedestal are inscribed panels in pink granite, and there is an inscription on the base.
