= Listed buildings in Nottingham (Bulwell Forest ward) =

Bulwell Forest ward is an electoral ward in the city of Nottingham, England. The ward contains two listed buildings that are recorded in the National Heritage List for England. Both the listed buildings are designated at Grade II, the lowest of the three grades, which is applied to "buildings of national importance and special interest". The listed buildings consist of a church and a war memorial in the churchyard.

== Buildings ==
Name and location	Photograph	Date	Notes
St Mary's Church; 53.00000°N 1.19399°W		1849–50	The church, was designed by H. I. Stevens, the organ chamber was added in 1896, and a chapel in 1956. It is built in stone with tile roofs, and consists of a nave, north and south aisles, north and south porches, a chancel with an organ chamber, north chapel and vestry, and a west tower. The tower has four stages, angle buttresses, an octagonal northwest stair turret, and an embattled parapet. On the west side is a doorway with a pointed arch and a hood mould, above which is a three-light window, lancet windows, clock faces, and two-light bell openings.
War memorial 52.99998°N 1.19431°W	—	c. 1920	The war memorial is in the churchyard of St Mary's Church to the west of the tower. It is in stone, and consists of a Celtic cross with an octagonal shaft, on a square pedestal with an inscription, on a chamfered plinth.
