= Listed buildings in Nottingham (Porchester ward) =

Porchester ward is a former electoral ward in the city of Nottingham, England. The ward contained two listed buildings that are recorded in the National Heritage List for England. Both the listed buildings are designated at Grade II, the lowest of the three grades, which is applied to "buildings of national importance and special interest". The ward was to the northeast of the city centre, and the listed buildings, a boundary marker and a war memorial, are adjacent to each other by a road junction.

== Buildings ==
Name and location	Photograph	Date	Notes
Boundary marker 52.98345°N 1.12329°W		1877	The boundary marker by the wall surrounding the war memorial is in cast iron. It consists of a half-round post with a domed top about 1 metre (3 ft 3 in) high. On the top is inscribed the date, and on the post are the names of the city officers.
War Memorial; 52.98345°N 1.12320°W		1922	The memorial stands by a road junction, and is in Portland stone. It consists of a tapered shaft with four buttresses, and is surmounted by a crocketed pinnacle. The shaft is on an octagonal pedestal with bronze plaques, in Portland stone paving. The memorial is surrounded by an octagonal wall in Bulwell stone with rounded coping, and contains two gates and four lengths of railing in cast iron.
