= Trinity School, Nottingham =

The Trinity Catholic School
- Coat of Arms

Location
- Beechdale Road; Aspley, Nottingham, Nottinghamshire, NG8 3EZ; England; 52°58′09″N 1°12′33″W

Information
- Type: Academy
- Motto: Ad Dei Gloriam ("To The Glory of God")
- Religious affiliation: Roman Catholic
- Established: 1975
- Founder: Sisters of Loreto
- Department for Education URN: 138341 Tables
- Ofsted: Reports
- Headteacher: Matt Shenton
- Gender: Coeducational
- Age: 11 to 18
- Enrolment: <1105
- Houses: St.Alphonsa, St.Lorenzo, St.Maximillian Kolbe, St.Teresa of Avila
- Colours: Green, silver and gold
- Diocese: Nottingham
- Website: http://www.trinity.nottingham.sch.uk

The Trinity School in Nottingham, England is a Catholic secondary school and sixth form with academy status for pupils aged 11–18. It is part of the Our Lady of Lourdes Catholic Multi Academy Trust.

== Admissions ==
Trinity is a church school, and has restricted admissions. It is situated off Beechdale Road, a main thoroughfare, near the junction with Kingsbury Drive, between Beechdale (to the south-east), Aspley (to the east), and Bilborough (to the west). The area has many secondary schools, with Bluecoat Beechdale Campus neighbouring to the west, and Nottingham Academy for Girls nearby to the east. Woodlands School, a school for children with special needs, neighbours to the east. The north half of the school lies in Aspley, and the southern half is in Bilborough.

== History ==
=== Former schools ===
Bishop Dunn School was a co-educational secondary modern school on Kingsbury Drive, and named after Thomas Dunn. St Catherine's Convent School was at the Convent of Mercy on College Street in central Nottingham near Nottingham Cathedral from 1846, run by the Sisters of Mercy. It became a grammar school in 1951. It moved to Beechdale Road in 1962, becoming the Loreto Grammar School for Girls, a girls' Roman Catholic grammar school. The site on Beechdale Road was then run by the Sisters of Loreto, also known as the Institute of the Blessed Virgin Mary. It took in catholic girls from all over Nottingham and outside the city.

=== Comprehensive ===
It was formed in 1975 by the merger of the grammar school and secondary modern. The grammar school site is now the upper school.

A fire on the evening of Monday 10 October 1994 destroyed the sixth form centre, causing £200,000 of damage. Two nine year old boys were charged, but legal culpability was difficult, due to the arsonists being under ten years of age.

=== Academy ===
The school converted to academy status on 1 July 2012, and is no longer directly funded or governed by Nottingham City Council. However, the school continues to co-operate with the council in regards to admissions.

== Traditions ==
=== The school badge ===
The school badge, re-designed in 1988, encapsulates much of the school's credo and ideology. The cross is derived from the Bishop's cross. The fleur-de-lys represents the Loreto School and the Triangle the first symbol of The Trinity School. They are set in school colours of green, black, silver and gold.

=== Houses ===
In year 7 pupils are allocated into four different houses who compete against each other in a range of activities including the annual athletics competition and sports day. The school runs House competitions such as House Debate, Inter-house Drama, Modern Foreign Languages and Piano recitals.

The 4 houses are named after Saints of the Catholic Church.

- St Alphonsa
- St Lorenzo
- St Maximillian Kolbe
- St Teresa of Avila

=== The Music Department ===
The school has a thriving music department, which is recognised nationally as being one of Nottinghamshire and the UK's finest in a comprehensive school. The music department encourages children of all ages, backgrounds and abilities to take up an instrument through its 'Orchestra' classes and also through an abundance of extra-curricular music ensembles led by music specialists. The school's Orchestra classes, which are a Trinity signature, offer every student in years 7 to 9 the ability to learn and play an instrument. Orchestra lessons offer violin, recorder and multi-instrumental tuition. The school's tradition of having such a special and inclusive music department has gained the school national acclaim and separates the school from competitors which has been recognised by high-profile musicians, composers and politicians. Music's tradition at Trinity has enabled current and ex students to progress in their academic and music careers; notably Sheku Kanneh-Mason, who became the first black winner of the BBC Young Musician of the Year competition in 2016.

The extra-curricular music offers groups which include a brass band, concert band, chamber orchestra, senior and lower choirs, string ensembles, rock and blues band, guitar groups, music tech clubs. The possibility of funding cuts prompted ex-student Sheku Kanneh-Mason to donate £3,000 to save cello tuition at the school in 2017 from being discontinued. Sheku said of the school "I have had amazing opportunities at Trinity School, and to see other children not have the same opportunities as I had would be a huge shame."

In 2020 former Trinity student Jacob Fowler, won the BBC Two TV show Little Mix: The Search with his band Since September.

== Activities ==
=== Trinity School Show Band ===
The Trinity School Show Band was formed in 1997 as a traditional marching brass band with thirty eight members, developing into over a hundred members when it became a show band. They have taken part in competitions since 2001 when they entered the World Championships in Germany. They won the Colchester Band Contest trophy (Division Two) three times between 2006 and 2008. For the 2009 season, the band were placed in BYBA's top division. At BYBA finals, Trinity came first beating all the other bands in their division. Other awards include, Academy Brass 2006 (Division Two), National Championships (Division Two) in 2006 and 2007, and Ouse Valley Sounds MBC 2008 (Division Two).

Following a year away from competing, for the 2014 season, the show band competed in Division 2 of the British Youth Band Association and won the first show of the season, at Music Revolution in Bradford taking Music Effect, Music Analysis, Field Wind, Field Visual, Field Percussion and Colour Guard captions.

The Trinity School Show Band ceased to exist in 2017.

== Academic performance ==
Trinity has achieved an outstanding academic reputation. Public examinations at KS3, KS4 and KS5 have all been to a very high standard. GCSE results have steadily improved, not just 5 A* to C benchmarks but also the numbers of higher grades including English and Maths. Each year most of the 100 or so Year 13 students leave with their first choice of University. [The actual raw data is on the DCSF performance tables web site, and the schools own web site]. This is coupled with excellent extra-curricular achievements in music, sport and adventure training which demonstrate the tenacity and ambition of the school. The school also works closely with its associated parishes, firmly within the Catholic ethos it seeks to promote. The school enjoys good support from parents and fosters excellent relationships with pupils, as is reflected and evidenced in the most recent Ofsted report of November 2008.

Although Nottingham has many poor performing secondary schools, it offers good results at GCSE, regularly having joint-best results for the LEA's schools, with Fernwood School. Fernwood, similar to many secondary schools in Nottingham, does not have a sixth form. Trinity is the only 11–18 school in Nottingham to get above-average results at A-level, except the independent (fee-paying) Nottingham High School and Nottingham High School for Girls. Many schools in Nottingham have recently become academies.

== Notable alumni ==
- Amari Williams (b. 2002)- basketball player, drafted 46th by the Boston Celtics in the 2025 NBA Draft
- Kim Vithana (b. 1970) - actress
- Paul McMahon (b. 1983) - left Trinity in 2001 to read for a law degree at Oxford University. He plays international cricket and is currently in South Africa.
- Leon Best (b. 1986) - Republic of Ireland international footballer
- Robert Lachowicz (b. 1990) - Professional ice hockey forward who currently plays with Nottingham Panthers
- Sheku Kanneh-Mason (b. 1999) - 2016 BBC Young Musician of the Year.
- Jacob Fowler (b. 2000) - winner of the BBC One series Little Mix The Search
- Rob Green, vocalist who performed at BBC Prom 57 (the Swing Prom) 2017
- Isata Kanneh-Mason, semi-finalist BBC Young Musician of the Year, 2014

=== Loreto Convent School ===
- Jo Cleary, Chair since 2012 of the National Skills Academy for Social Care, and since 2013 of the College of Social Work

=== St Catherine's Convent of Mercy Grammar School ===
- Commandant Nursing Officer Jane Titley CBE, Director of the Defence Nursing Services from 1992 to 1995, and Matron-in-Chief from 1990 to 1994 of the Queen Alexandra's Royal Naval Nursing Service

=== Convent of Mercy School ===
- Teresa Helena Higginson (1844-1905) - religious mystic

== Teachers ==
Matt Shenton is the current Headteacher, with Mike Griffin as Deputy Headteacher. Assistant Headteachers are Rupert Bennett, Caroline McGrath, Steven Wadsley and Dan Kelly.

=== Safeguarding incidents ===
In May 2026, a former French teacher - formerly known as Joshua Mills Afford - at the school was jailed after being convicted of sexual offences against two students while in a position of trust. He was sentenced to 22 months' imprisonment after pleading guilty to 10 counts of sexual activity with a child while in a position of trust and one count of making an indecent image of a child.

A drama technician - known as James Riddell - for the School was discovered in 2013 to have coerced a 17-year-old to perform a lewd sex act on him in a locked classroom, and had additionally taken the same girl to a secluded area where they engaged in alfresco sexual activity. He was subsequently sentenced to a 12-month prison sentence (suspended for two years) and ten years on the Sex Offenders Register, with the judge ruling that his 16-year old victim had 'given in to temptation'.

== See also ==
- Loreto Grammar School, girls' grammar school in Altrincham
