= Hempshill Hall Primary School =

Location
- Armstrong Road, Bulwell; Nottingham, Nottinghamshire, NG6 7AT; England
- Coordinates: 52°59′43″N 1°12′54″W

Information
- Type: Community school
- Local authority: Nottingham City Council
- Department for Education URN: 122493 Tables
- Ofsted: Reports
- Chair of governors: Mrs Barbara williams
- Headteachers: Mrs Dakin and Mrs Gregg
- Gender: Mixed
- Age: 3 to 11
- Enrolment: 401

The Hempshill Hall Primary School is a primary school in Bulwell, Nottingham that is situated within, and serves, the surrounding estate of Hempshill Vale. The current Headteacher are Mrs Dakin and Mrs Gregg. The School is part of a family of schools in the Basford area of Nottingham. The academic attainments have been achieved despite pupils' socio-economic circumstances being unfavourable.

== Academic standards ==
In the May 2006 Ofsted inspection the school was rated Good, point two on a four-point scale, and described as "Hempshill Hall is a good school with some outstanding features.". A Grade 1 Outstanding assessment was made of:

- How good is the overall personal development and well-being of the learners?
- How well do the curriculum and other activities meet the range of needs and interests of learners?
- How well are learners cared for, guided and supported?

The school is unusual for a British primary school in that it teaches Spanish.

Their most recent OFSTED report, concluded that the school's standards are outstanding. This was following the previous inspection where they were rated "Requires Improvement"

== A Year in the Life ==
From January 2004 to January 2005, year 6 children and staff produced a notable video entitled 'A year in the life of Hempshill Hall School', to celebrate the school's 30th year.

== Drugs education ==
Fifty year six children from the school took part in a drug awareness CD, in March 2004, that was distributed throughout Nottinghamshire.

== Notable staff ==
The school was previously served by long standing headteacher Helen Marcia Puckey (known as Marcia), who was Britain's longest-serving school head when she retired in summer 2005, and was awarded the OBE, in recognition of her ‘services to education’ in the Queen's New Year's Honours List 2006. In May 2006 Marcia Puckey temporarily took charge at the Haydn Primary School after its then headteacher, Jim Green, resigned his post after the critical report from Ofsted inspectors.

== Published report ==
- Joyce, B. and others. (1997) Inquiring and Collaborating at an Exemplary School. Educational Leadership, May 1997.

Describes Hempshill Hall Primary School. The curriculum is organised around related concepts, not topics. The performance of students on a national assessment was almost double the national average.
