= Bilborough College =

College in Nottingham, UK

Coordinates: 52°58′01″N 1°14′05″W

Bilborough Sixth Form College
- Type: Sixth form college
- Established: 1975
- Principal: Dave Shaw
- Location: Nottingham, England
- Website: bilborough.ac.uk

Bilborough Sixth Form College is a sixth-form college in Nottingham, England. The college has students from across the conurbation. A third of its students come from Nottingham, another third from the surrounding county of Nottinghamshire, and a final third from Derbyshire. The majority of students study at the college for two years.

== History ==
Opened in 1957 as Bilborough Grammar School, the school became a sixth-form college in 1975 when Nottingham's education system became comprehensive. The college has grown from 635 students to 1600 full-time students enrolled to be attending the college in September 2016.

The new accommodations opened officially on 21 July, 2006. The new building is divided into 3 blocks (A, B, and C), and 4 floors (0-3). The new building has a photographic lab, lecture theatre, theatre, shop, refectory, large art rooms, library, and "soundproof" music rooms. The development, designed by CPMG Architects, has won a design award from the local civic society, and has received the Lord Mayor of Nottingham's Award for Urban Design.

== Curriculum ==
The curriculum is based on A-level provision with the option for some BTEC qualifications. The college offers students the opportunity to study a wide variety of subjects.

=== A Level ===
Visual and Performing Arts	Social Science	Language and Communication	Professional Studies	Science and PE	Mathematics and Computing	Extended Studies
Art	Ethics, Philosophy and Religion	English Language	Business Studies	Chemistry	Further Mathematics	Trinity Acting
Dance	Geography	English Literature	Law	Electronics	Mathematical Studies	Extended Project Qualification
Drama and Theatre Studies	Government and Politics	French		Physical Education	Mathematics	
Film Studies	History	German		Physics	Computer Science	
Media Studies	Psychology	Spanish		Biology		
Music	Sociology					
Music Technology	Criminology					
Photography	Economics					
Product Design						

=== BTEC ===
The college offers BTEC qualifications across the following areas:

- Performing Arts
- Information Technology
- Creative Digital Media Production
- Business
- Sport
- Applied Science

=== International Baccalaureate ===
The International Baccalaureate was taught at the college from 2009 to 2016 and celebrated some of the best national results, including three 40+ scores.

== Academic performance ==
Bilborough College students have had A-level pass rates exceeding 98% since 2004, with 27 of the subjects on offer reaching pass rates of 100%. Twenty-five per cent of entries achieved A*- A, 3% more than the previous year, while over 50% achieved grades A*-B.

The most recent Ofsted inspection, in 2020, found the college rated as “good” in all categories by inspectors. The college was also rated good in the previous inspection in 2016.

== Alumni ==
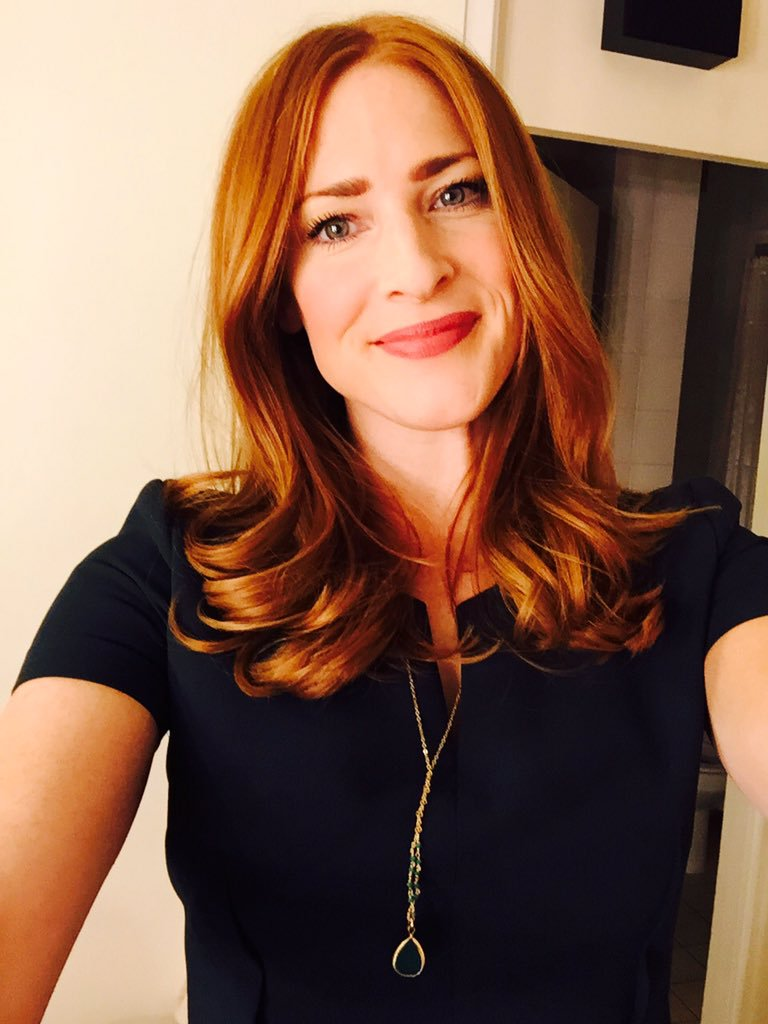
Actress Rosalie Craig, attended from 1997-99

- Tom Blyth, actor (2011-)
- Rosalie Craig, theatre and musical actress
- Richard Leafe, Chief Executive since 2007 of the Lake District National Park Authority (1981-83)
- Janey Lee Grace, radio presenter (1976-78)
- Grace Hodgett Young, actress
- Alice Levine, DJ and presenter (2002-04)
- Nadia Whittome, British Labour Politician, MP for Nottingham East since 2019 (2012-14)
- Anisah Osman Britton MBE, founder of 23CodeStreet and reporter at Sifted
- Molly Windsor, actress and winner of the 2018 BAFTA TV Award for Best Actress

=== Bilborough Grammar School ===
- Rosie Barnes (née Allen), former SDP MP from 1987-92, and also her husband Graham Barnes (1957-64)
- Dame Judith Rees, Director from 2011-12 of the London School of Economics, and President from 2012-15 of the Royal Geographical Society (1955-62)
