= Bluecoat Beechdale Academy =

Location
- Harvey Road, Bilborough; Nottingham, Nottinghamshire, NG8 3GP; England
- Coordinates: 52.9664°N 1.2124°W

Information
- Former name: Hadden Park High School
- Type: Academy
- Motto: Belong, Believe, Achieve
- Local authority: Nottingham City Council
- Trust: Archway Learning Trust
- Department for Education URN: 140369 Tables
- Ofsted: Reports
- Principal: Rachel Frearson
- Gender: Mixed
- Age range: 11–16
- Enrolment: 901 (2025)
- Capacity: 900
- Website: www.bluecoatbeechdale.co.uk

Bluecoat Beechdale Academy (formerly Hadden Park High School, and prior to 2001 Glaisdale Comprehensive) is an 11–16 mixed secondary school with academy status in Bilborough, Nottingham, Nottinghamshire, England. It is part of the Archway Learning Trust.

There was a £11m refurbishment by Inspired Spaces. Hadden Park High School had 10.7% absence in total (8.6% locally, 7.3% nationally) and 12.6% persistent (8.7% locally, 5.9% nationally). Since its launch as Bluecoat Beechdale Academy, attendance has risen above local and national averages, fixed-term exclusions have fallen by more than 50%, the projected budget deficit has been addressed and student numbers have risen sharply after many years of decline.

The school became an academy on 1 April 2014.

== Sponsor ==
The Bluecoat Beechdale Academy is sponsored by Bluecoat Academy and was formerly named as Hadden Park High School, In April 2014 Department for Education(DfE) made and renamed Hadden Park High School into Bluecoat Beechdale Academy sponsored by Bluecoat Academies Trust. The school is now sponsored by Archway Learning Trust.
