= Bluecoat Aspley Academy =

Location
- Aspley Lane; Nottingham, Nottinghamshire, NG8 5GY; England; 52°58′08″N 1°11′35″W

Information
- Type: Academy
- Motto: Believe in yourself, in others, in God
- Religious affiliation: Church of England
- Established: 1706; 320 years ago
- Local authority: Nottingham
- Trust: Archway Learning Trust
- Department for Education URN: 137798 Tables
- Ofsted: Reports
- Principal: S Anderson
- Gender: Coeducational
- Age: 11 to 18
- Enrolment: 1585
- Houses: Braithwaite; Fenton; Inglis; Mellors; Rippon; Thorpe; Harrison
- Colours: Blue, green, purple, yellow, white, red and orange
- Website: http://www.bluecoataspley.co.uk/

Bluecoat Aspley Academy is a Church of England secondary school and sixth form located in the Aspley area of Nottingham, England, dating back to 1706. In 2007, the school had 1550 students aged six to eighteen, including 250 sixth form students. Prior to receiving academy status in January 2012, the school was titled The Nottingham Bluecoat School and Technology College.

== History ==
The school was founded in 1706 as the first charity school in Nottingham, under the guidance of the then rector of St. Peter's Church, Timothy Fenton. Classes were taught in the porch of St. Mary's Church in the Lace Market area of Nottingham. On 1 May 1707, the school moved to St. Mary's Gate.

In 1723, land that was given by William Thorpe on High Pavement in Weekday Cross was used and the school migrated there, remaining there for over a century.

In 1855, the school moved to a purpose-built building on Mansfield Road in Nottingham. The building is now the International Community Centre. A statue of a child in a latter-day Bluecoat uniform remains on the outside of the building. A road behind this site of the school is called Bluecoat Close.

In the period between the two World Wars, the school became a grammar school. During the 1960s fund-raising was undertaken to acquire new property and to construct a purpose-built new school to allow for expansion including on-site sports fields. In 1967, the school relocated to the current premises on Aspley Lane in Aspley, two miles to the east of Nottingham. This allowed the school to increase the intake from one class to two classes (from 30 students to 60) resulting in the number of the pupils increasing to around 350 over a period of about five years. At the same time, the school assumed voluntary aided school status.

By 1978, the number of students had grown to 900 with the new status as a comprehensive school catering for eleven- to eighteen-year-olds. Two decades later, a further status change took place with the school being awarded Technology College status by the Department for Education and Skills enabling the school to receive additional funding for development Science, Mathematics and Information Technology education.

In 2003, Bluecoat was "twinned" with, and then later took over the site of Margaret Glen-Bott School in the nearby Wollaton area. The site was renamed as the Nottingham Bluecoat School and Technology College: Wollaton Park Campus with the main Bluecoat site becoming the Aspley Lane Campus. The two sites began to operate as a single school and share some administration resources including a single headteacher and principal for the two sites.

The Aspley Lane Campus gained a new building in 2006, as part of an extensive redevelopment project. The total cost of construction was £20 million, including £3 million being raised and contributed from the school's Tercentenary Appeal. The new building, also known as the Alfred Harrison Building, contains specialised drama, music and art studios. The building also included a new chapel area and a prayer room in the centre. Surrounded by these were new classrooms, dedicated to IT, music, social sciences, modern foreign languages and design technology. After construction was completed and owing to unexpected costs, the school was approximately £2.5 million in debt. This shortfall was intended to be resolved with a loan from Nottingham City Council. The Alfred Harrison site also accommodates extensive special needs resources, including an entire department dedicated to special needs students. This department is called Learning Suppor'.

On 4 February 2008, Max R Kay resigned from his position as the school's long-standing headteacher and principal, following a fifteen-month-long suspension and investigation relating to a financial probe regarding publicly funded building projects; and the confirmed presence of Legionnaires' disease.

In 2009, it was announced that the Wollaton Park Campus was to be closed, and that there would only be one school - on the Aspley site. Initially, all incoming students were to go to the Wollaton site, and then would move, along with the rest of the campus, to the unified campus. Owing to a lack of funds, the plans were scrapped and work went underway to improve the Wollaton site instead. The students of academic year 2010–11, who all went to the Wollaton site, were effectively split in half. One half of the students were to stay at Wollaton, and the other half was to go to the Aspley site.

On 1 January 2012, the Nottingham Bluecoat School received academy status, and so it became Bluecoat Academy.

In September 2013, expansion projects totalling approximately £14 million started on the Wollaton Park Campus. The expansion has since completed. The Aspley Campus was also due for expansion, but this was not undertaken owing to a lack of funds.

In 2014, what was formerly known has Hadden Park High School was refurbished and sponsored by the Bluecoat Academies Trust to become Bluecoat Beechdale Academy. The newly formed school received academy status on 1 April 2014. It was revisited by Ofsted in March 2017 and was designated as 'good'.

In November 2014, following prolonged growth in student numbers, a £1.4 million two-storey extension was begun to the existing Sixth Form building at Aspley Lane Campus. Completed in August 2015, the extension provided new facilities including a new lecture theatre, canteen and kitchen, as well as additional classrooms and self-study areas, enabling bringing student numbers to rise over 500.

In October 2017 the Wollaton Park Campus formally demerged from Bluecoat Academy and was renamed Bluecoat Wollaton Academy. The Aspley Campus of the school was renamed Bluecoat Aspley Academy.

In February 2018, building work commenced at Bluecoat Aspley Academy with the construction of a "new Science block" due for completion in January 2019. Once tis is completed, an additional new building for Maths and English will be constructed.

In May 2018, the most recent Ofsted report described the school as 'good.'

In 2019, a new Science block opened.

In 2020, just before the national lockdown, a new Maths & Languages block open. It has a new cafeteria, activity studio and brand new classrooms.

== Further information ==
Bluecoat Aspley Academy has space for fourteen tennis courts, two hard play areas, two full size pitches and one athletics track. There are a full-size sports hall, fitness suite, activity studio and dance studio available for use by students in PE lessons and after school activities. If required, there is also access to Melbourne Park for additional pitches and field space. There are nine computer rooms in the main school block, with some more in the Sixth Form block. There are a library, science labs, Food Preparation room and a Drama Studio with professional lighting, all of which is accessible to students.

== Curriculum ==
The school follows the National Curriculum. In years 7 and 8, all students follow a core curriculum that covers the national Curriculum. In years 9, 10 and 11 students may choose some of the subjects they study; including modern foreign languages, humanities and technology subject choices, BTECs and Diplomas. Mathematics, English, sciences, Religious Education and core physical educations remain compulsory for the rest of the students' school life, whereas PSHE only remains compulsory for the first year of the students' GCSE life (Year 9).

The Sixth Form offers a wide variety of subjects at National Qualifications Framework (NQF) levels 1–3, as well as a range of established AS/A2 level courses. A wider range of vocational courses was introduced in September 2006 including BTEC qualifications. Also taught is the DiDA (Diploma in Digital Applications) qualification in Information and Communication Technology (ICT).

Other academic options may include GCSE resits in Math and English.

The school participates in foreign exchanges with China, France, Italy (Cittadella) and Germany. As well as the exchanges, the post-16 faculty is expanding links into South Africa and China, having successfully linked up with Christ's Hope International in Namibia in 2005/6.

== Houses ==
Students in the school are split up into seven different houses. Generally, each student will remain with the same house throughout his or her stay at the school: however, given a viable reason, the school can reconsider allocation of a student to a different house (which has occurred). This may also happen if a student is distracted or misbehaves in his or her house. Each house has its own coloured tie:

- Braithwaite - blue
- Fenton - green
- Inglis - purple (since 1996)
- Mellors - yellow
- Rippon - white
- Thorpe - red
- Alfred Harrison - orange (since 2013)

Every morning, the form group meets to take the register and inform the students of notices. In the form times, they complete activities such as believe time, PSHE, and critical thinkers. The houses also come into play during sports day towards the end of the year, and in inter-house competitions.

In 1993, the school expanded from a five house system to a six house system; this extra class of students was named "BC" (attached to Braithwaite), and as of the 1994 intake "MN" (attached to Mellors). The new "Inglis" house was established in 1996 combining the temporarily assigned houses with the new intake.

In 2013, a seventh house was introduced, named Harrison. Little is known about this new house, except that it is named after a benefactor of the school.

Each student also has a form group. The 'form group' of a student is simply a group of students who are in the same house and same year as each other. The form group also has a 'form tutor', who overlooks this form group. Sometimes, the form group takes part in 'believe time', a time dedicated to activities, with at the end a short prayer.

Each year, every form group will decide on a charity, and on one Wednesday each term, will attempt to raise money for these charities with fund raisers.

In September 2010 and 2012, only one campus took in new students. In 2010, this was Wollaton Park, and in 2012, this was Aspley Lane. The school created two form groups for each house in this situation, to prevent the form groups from being too large. They were named after the house of which they were part, followed by either 1 or 2. (for example, Braithwaite would consist of two form groups, Braithwaite 1 and Braithwaite 2.)

In years 7 & 8, the majority of lessons are taken with the mixed-ability groups. During the first two years, they spend the majority of the time in the same classes about the same students. The next year, most lessons including Maths, English, Science and RS are setted.

== Extracurricular activities ==
There are clubs and societies that run during lunch times and after the school day. The school participates in The Duke of Edinburgh's Award scheme, from Bronze to Gold.

The Wollaton Park Campus building was formerly the home to Cornerstone Church, a large independent evangelical church, who had their offices within the school and met at the school each Sunday. Once the BSF redevelopment began, Cornerstone relocated to a new, purpose-built church on the site of the old MFI building on castle boulevard.

In 2011, the girl band Parade visited the school and performed for a selection of special students. In 2012, Lucien Laviscount visited the Wollaton site. In 2015, Jermain Jackman visited and performed at the Aspley site to promote the National Citizen Service programme. All Wollaton and Beechdale students were escorted to the Aspley site to see the performance.

== GCSE results ==
In the academic year 2010–2011, 86% of students at the Nottingham Bluecoat School (both campuses) received A*-C GCSE results. This is the highest set of GCSE results the school has ever achieved, and means that only 14% of students got D-F.

Compulsory GCSE subjects are English, Maths, Science, and Religious Studies. Students also have to study PE and PSHE as a subject but not as a GCSE. Some people have to do ICT and one of the 4 technologies, but others do not.

== Awards ==
Awards the school has received include:

- Schools Achievement Award in 2002 and 2003
- The Sportsmark Award
- The Career Mark Award (page does not exist for this yet)
- Investors in People Award
- Young People playing and performing at local, regional and national levels
- Artsmark Award
- Lord Mayors Award for Enterprise
- Healthy Schools Status
- International School Award 2007/2008

== Notable former pupils ==
- Rehan Ahmed, England cricketer
- Krishnan Ganesh, Indian chemist
- Bilal Shafayat, cricketer

=== Nottingham Bluecoat C of E Grammar School ===
- Steven Betts, Archdeacon of Norfolk since 2012
- Jane Denton CBE FRCN, director since 1999 of the Multiple Births Foundation, who helped to found the Human Fertilisation and Embryology Authority
- Mark Flanagan, musician
- John Hose CBE, president from 1978-82 of the National Union of Agricultural and Allied Workers

== See also ==
- Bluecoat school
- Bluecoat Beechdale Academy
- Bluecoat Wollaton Academy
