= Aspley, Nottingham =

Housing estate in Nottingham, England

Coordinates: 52.976°N 1.201°W

Aspley
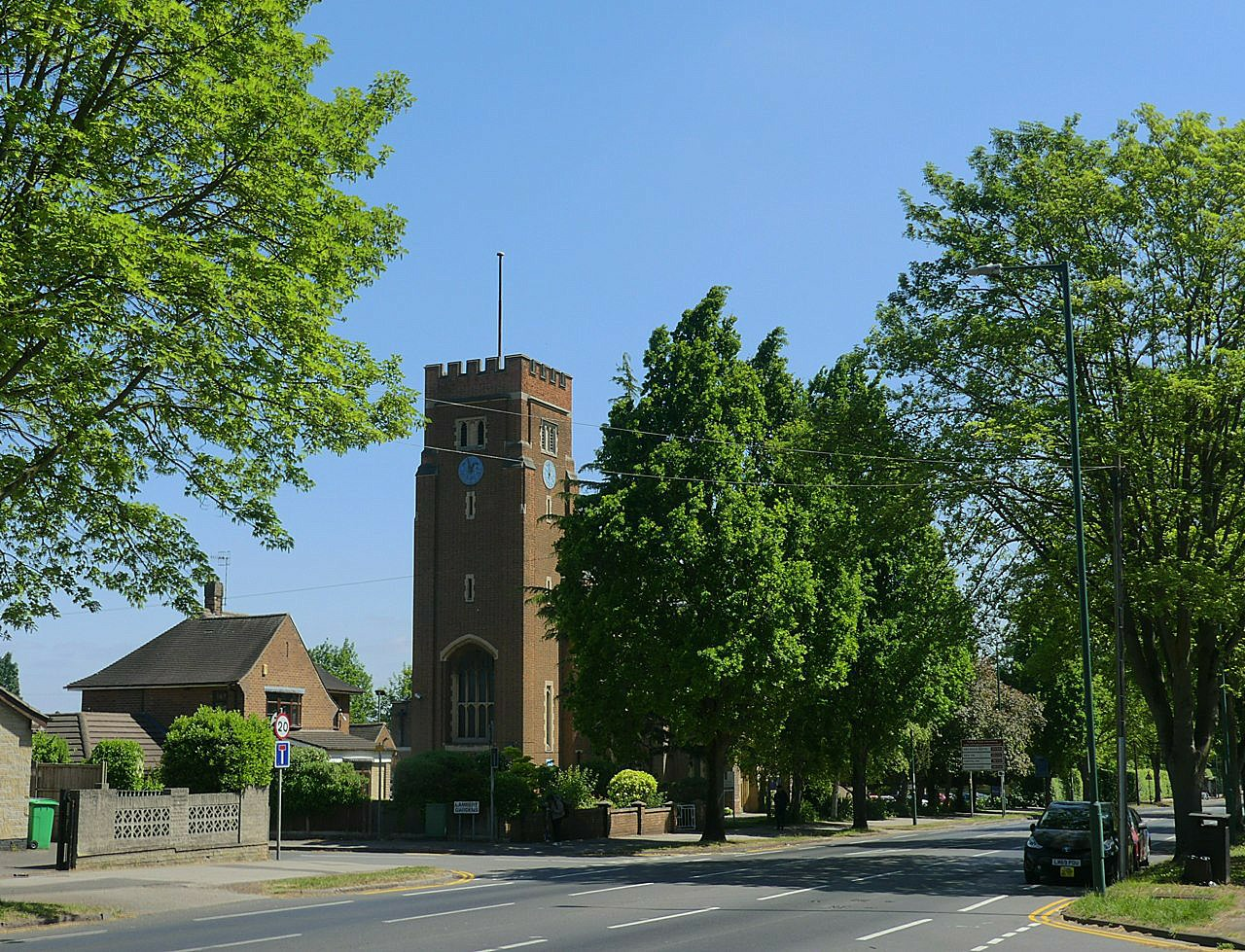
- St Margaret’s Church

- Location within Nottinghamshire
- Population: 17,622 (Ward 2011)
- OS grid reference: SK 53645 42405
- Unitary authority: Nottingham
- Ceremonial county: Nottinghamshire
- Region: East Midlands
- Country: England
- Sovereign state: United Kingdom
- Post town: NOTTINGHAM
- Postcode district: NG8
- Dialling code: 0115
- Police: Nottinghamshire
- Fire: Nottinghamshire
- Ambulance: East Midlands
- UK Parliament: Nottingham North and Kimberley

Aspley is an area and a ward of the city of Nottingham, Nottinghamshire, England. It is located within the boundaries of Nottingham City Council. The ward is located 3 miles (4.8 km) west of Nottingham City Centre and is located only 1.6 miles south-east of Junction 26 of the M1. It lies south of Bulwell, west of Basford and is north of Bilborough. The principal road in the ward is the A610. At the 2001 Census the ward had a population of 15,689, increasing to 17,622 at the 2011 census.

For a number of centuries the ward consisted of just a number of small settlements and was home to both Broxtowe and Aspley Hall, the latter home to the Willoughby family for a number of generations. In the early 20th century Nottingham City Council, after a number of purchase orders developed the area into a large housing estate.

The ward contains three housing estates which consist of Aspley, Broxtowe (not to be confused with the borough Broxtowe) and Bells Lane estate. Aspley has a number of shops, a local library and transport links (by bus) with Nottingham City Centre and surrounding areas.

== History ==
The earliest recording of the area is as 'Aspeleia' in 1108, derived from a word relating to Aspen trees.

Originally known as 'Asshelepley Halle', Aspley Hall was constructed in or prior to the 16th century. The hall's original purpose was to house monks from nearby Lenton who had been removed from their previous dwellings due to the dissolution of the monasteries in 1538. From then on the hall fell into various hands, most notably into the possession of the wealthy Willoughby family, who also owned the nearby Wollaton Hall. The Willoughby family continued to manage the hall until 1925 until which the property was sold to Alderman G. E. Taylor. After Taylor's death in 1965, the hall fell into disrepair and was eventually demolished in 1968 and replaced with a number of detached houses.

Broxtowe Hall painting, 1833

Until its demolition in 1937, Broxtowe Hall was situated on the present day site of Broxtowe Lane. Broxtowe takes its name from Brocul, who in ancient times was the holder of the "stoe," or place, and it was made one of the six wapentakes of Nottinghamshire when King Alfred divided England into its present counties. The earliest mention of Broxtowe Hall dates back to the 11th century in which gifts from Gilbert, son of Eustachius de Broculstowe were sent to Lenton Priory. Centuries later the Arctic voyager Sir Hugh Willoughby took up residency of the property. In 1590 the hall fell into the possession of the joint founder of the General Baptist denomination, Thomas Helwys, primarily serving as a centre for Puritans of the region, Broxtowe Hall become a refuge for separatists such as John Smyth who would later become a close friend of Helwys. During the English Civil War it saw action as a stronghold for Parliament and was commanded by the young Captain Thornhagh who after an attack on Shelford Hall was left fatally wounded by a bullet. On the other-hand Aspley Hall (connected to Broxtowe Lane by Aspley Lane, a distance of just 0.9 miles) was garrisoned for King Charles I by the Willoughby family.

Many years prior to and sometime after the construction of the housing estates in the area, stood The Mineral Railway. The railway, ran from the west side of Nuthall Road and across to the other side of Aspley Lane, its main purpose was to carry goods and supplies to and from the local Cinderhill Colliery.

Adjacent to the Bilborough, Basford and Leen Valley wards, development of the ward began in the 1920s as part of an initiative by the local council to clear inner city slums. Beginning with the purchase of land to the west of Old Basford in 1928, construction was temporarily halted due to the outbreak of World War II, however, development of the ward finally resumed with the conclusion of the war, being completed shortly thereafter.

== Government ==
=== Local elections ===
The ward elects three local councillors who thereby take seats in Nottingham City Council. In recent years the ward has become somewhat of a Labour Party stronghold, the 2007 elections saw Labour win, with all three of its candidates becoming councillors. Again the 2011 Local elections saw Labour taking all three seats with councillors Graham Chapman, Carole McCulloch and Leon Unczur being chosen to represent the ward.

Election	Councillors	Party	Notes
1995	J.Scott and B.James	Labour	
1997	Donald John Scott and Leon Unczur	Labour	
2003	Graham Chapman, Hylton James, Leon Unczur	Labour	
2007	Graham Chapman, Hylton James, Leon Unczur	Labour	
2011	Graham Chapman, Carole McCulloch, Leon Unczur	Labour	
2015	Graham Chapman, Carole McCulloch, Patience Ifediora	Labour	Incumbents

=== Members of Parliament ===
For national elections to the House of Commons the area lies in the constituency of Nottingham North, the constituency is represented by Labour MP Alex Norris.

Election	Member	Party	Notes
1955	James Harrison	Labour	Died in office May 1959; seat remained vacant until general election in October
1959	Bill Whitlock	Labour	
1983	Richard Ottaway	Conservative	Most recently an MP for Croydon South, from 1992 to 2015.
1987	Graham Allen	Labour	
2017	Alex Norris	Labour	Incumbent.

== Demography ==
According to data taken from the 2001 Census, the ward has a population totalling 15,689. The census data shows that the majority of the population is made up of 25- to 44-year-olds, who make up 28.8% of the population.

Recent statistics have shown that Aspley has one of the highest teenage pregnancy rates in Europe. According to figures taken from 2009, roughly one in eight teenagers was falling pregnant, with 2008 showing that teenage mothers accounted for 218 births.

While data from the 2001 Census showed Aspley as having a small unemployment rate of just 3%, recent figures show the unemployment rate in the area rising dramatically. The group BEST (Broxtowe Education, Skills & Training) released data showing that unemployment had risen over 7% in eight years, with just over 10% of the population not in work. This trend has continued into 2012, with data in June showing that 10.7% of people were without employment.

== Education ==
There are several schools within the Aspley council estate, among them Trinity School, Nottingham Girls' Academy and Bluecoat Aspley Academy. It also had the since demolished William Crane Comprehensive School which in 1999 finished joint bottom in the GCSE league tables, with only 4% of the 104 pupils being awarded with five GCSEs A-C's. William Crane eventually went onto close in 2003, in an interview with The Guardian assistant director of education at Nottingham city council, Russell Andrews explained "What we've got is a multi-layered set of social problems -social unrest where the school is, low morale among staff, low expectations, low input among parents. Had we taken a multi-layered approach to solving the problems five years ago it might have been different." Since the closure of William Crane, the two remaining primary schools in the area are currently Ambleside Primary School and Rosslyn Park Primary & Nursery School which has since moved to the Amesbury Circus site.

In 2012, according to research performed by the University of Nottingham only one in eight children in Bulwell, Aspley, Bilborough, Broxtowe Estate, Basford and Bestwood go on to university, just 13% compared to a national average of 34%.

Within the wider political ward, which contains the housing estates of both Broxtowe and Bells Lane, there is only one other school, which is Rosslyn Park Primary and Nursery School.

== Culture and community ==
=== Community ===
Originally opened on 18 December 1932 by the Duchess of Portland, Aspley Cinema was notable for installing the first panoramic screen in Nottingham in 1953. Over its 80-year history the building was rebranded a number of times, in 1957 at a cost of £30,000 the building was altered and renamed the Commodore Cinema and Ballroom with the cinema being removed a year later in 1958, the building was finally renamed the Commodore International in 1964. The building was finally closed on 31 August 2002. The building has now been demolished and replaced with a local ophthalmologist.

The Beacon public house can be found on Aspley Lane. Located on Nuthall Road is Aspley Library, construction of the library began in early 1937 with the foundation stone being laid on 25 January 1937. The library was finally completed on 25 November 1937 and was opened by Principal Wortley of University College.

The area is served by the Aspley Community and Training Centre located on Minver Crescent, the centre was built in 2001. Minver Crescent is also host to the Minver Crescent Sports Centre, built on the site that was formerly the location of William Crane Comprehensive School, the

centre boasts a number of facilities which include a sports hall and a fitness suite.

The council estate Aspley contains two parks, these are Melbourne Park, just off Melbourne Road and the King George V Playing Fields which lies between Beechdale Road and Aspley Lane. The former a host to one of the Nottinghamshire branches of the YMCA since 2000.

Located within the ward are two natural nature reserves. Within the Bells Lane estate is the Quarry Holes Plantation, the reserve can be found in a now defunct magnesian limestone quarry. Although beginning life as a quarry, with the building of nearby estates and suburbs during the interwar period, the area now boasts a range of foliage including false oat-grass, wood avens and Comfrey. As with Broxtowe Country Park, the Quarry Holes Nature Reserve has also benefitted from recent restoration schemes. Starting in 2012, work began to clear the reserve of overgrown foliage in an effort to allow new wildlife to grow.

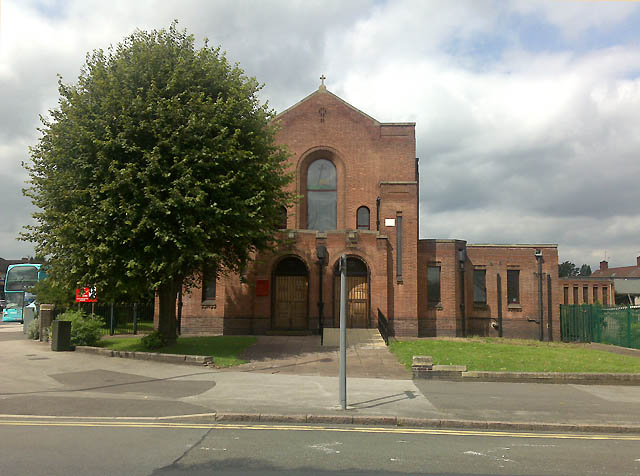
Aspley Methodist Church

Also located within the ward is Broxtowe Country Park, covering over 46 hectares, the park has been a fixture in the area since before 1066, then originally known as Broculeston. In recent years the park has benefitted from several different rejuvenation projects, in February 2012 the park was earmarked to receive funding for a new cycle path at the cost of £170,000, the work being completed in March 2012. In reference to the new cycle path Councillor Leon Unczur revealed "We have received some great feedback, particularly from the local community, about the new entrances and footpaths which marked the beginning of a whole series of improvements that we intend to make to Broxtowe County Park. We secured some external funding which can only be used to create cycle paths and so this is the perfect bolt-on to our existing programme of improvements to this park". The new 2 km cycle path links two major roads in the area, Nottingham Road (which is close to the Phoenix Park tram stop) and Woodhouse Way.

Plans are now afoot for further improvements to the park, the local council have recently announced that they are looking into the possibility of BMX facilities to be constructed in the park.

=== Culture ===
Aspley has several churches, of which include, St. Margaret's Church, Aspley (1936), Aspley Methodist Church, Aspley Evangelical Church (1931), Aspley Pentecostal Church (1948) and the Aspley branch of the Salvation Army. All are situated on Aspley Lane.

=== Notable residents ===
Among the area's most notable residents are those of the Willoughby family, this as a result of their ownership of Aspley Hall. Born at Aspley Hall in 1777, Sir Nesbit Josiah Willoughby (son of Robert Willoughby) was a British Royal Navy officer, who, after being knighted in 1827, became rear-admiral in 1847. His service included stints on board HMS Russell during the Battle of Copenhagen in 1801 and command of the frigate Néréide during the Battle of Grand Port. Henry Willoughby, 8th Baron Middleton (1817–1877) eldest son of Henry Willoughby (1780–1849) and Charlotte Eyre (died 1845) was also a resident of Aspley Hall.

== Transport ==
The ward is served by a number of different bus services, most of which are operated by Nottingham City Transport. The bus services link the ward to the City of Nottingham.

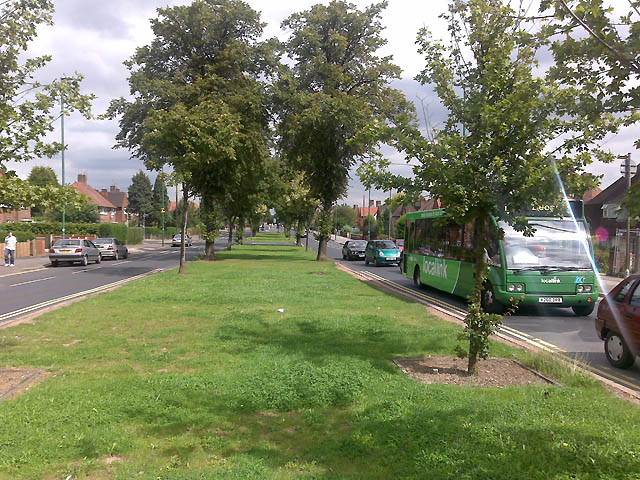
Melbourne Road

Nottingham City Transport

Turquoise Line

- 77: Nottingham → Maid Marian Way → Broadmarsh → Victoria Centre → Canning Circus → Alfreton Road → Aspley Lane → Strelley
- 77C: Nottingham → Maid Marian Way → Broadmarsh → Victoria Centre → Canning Circus → Alfreton Road → Aspley Lane → Strelley → Cinderhill
- 78: Nottingham → Maid Marian Way → Broadmarsh → Victoria Centre → Canning Circus → Alfreton Road → Strelley
- 79: Nottingham → Maid Marian Way → Broadmarsh → Victoria Centre → Canning Circus → Alfreton Road → Nuthall Road → Cinderhill → Bulwell, Bus Station → Rise Park → Top Valley → Bestwood Park → Arnold
- 79A: Nottingham → Maid Marian Way → Broadmarsh → Victoria Centre → Canning Circus → Alfreton Road → Nuthall Road → Cinderhill → Bulwell, Bus Station → Rise Park → Top Valley → Bestwood Park → Arnold

Orange Line

- 35: Nottingham, Victoria Centre → Angel Row → Derby Road → QMC/Nottingham University → Wollaton Vale → Bilborough → Strelley → Cinderhill → Bulwell

== See also ==
- Listed buildings in Nottingham (Aspley ward)
