= Broxtowe, Nottingham =

Council estate in Nottingham, England

Coordinates: 52.978°N 1.217°W

Broxtowe
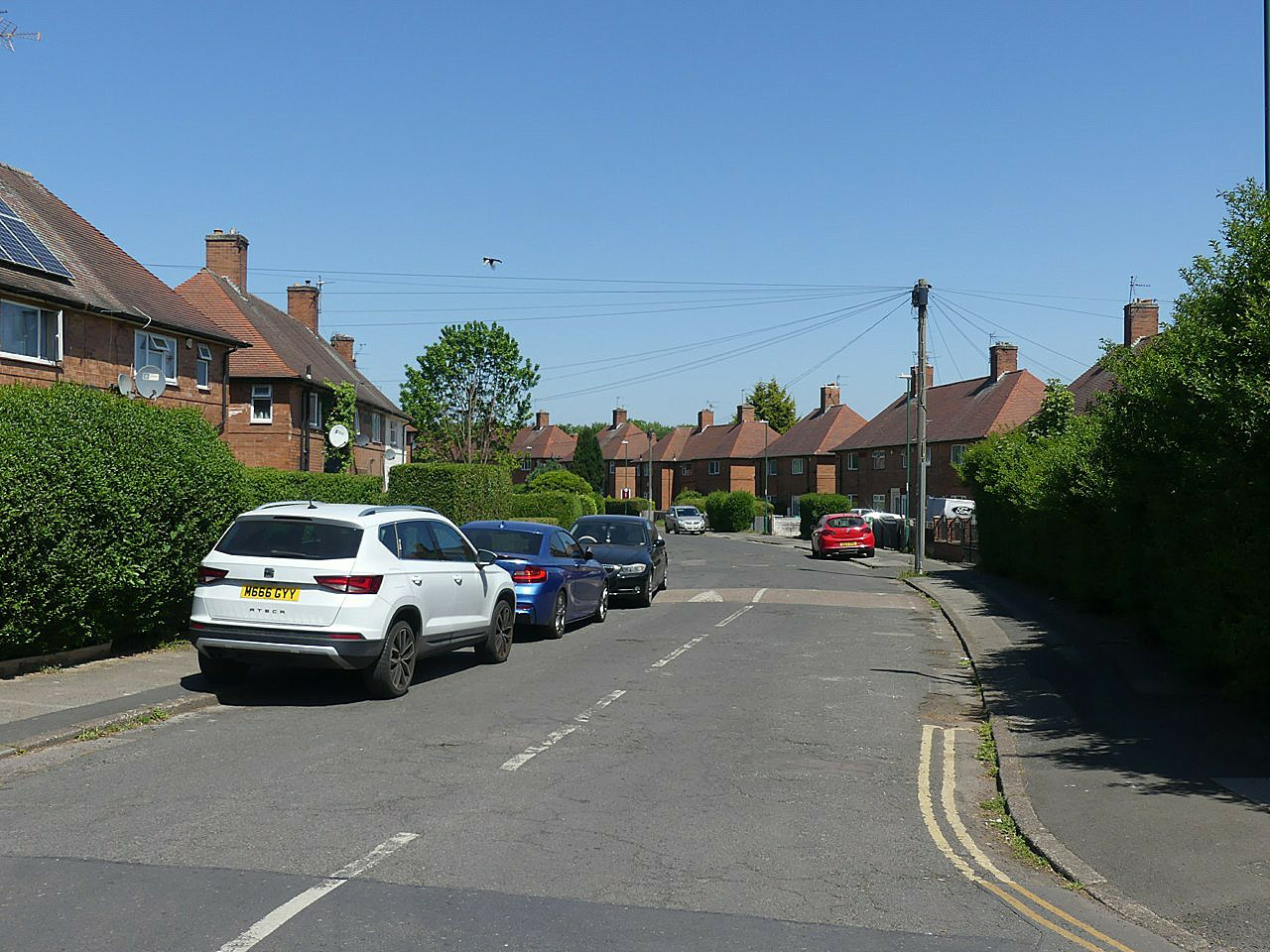
- Fenwick Road

- Location within Nottinghamshire
- Population: 4,847
- OS grid reference: SK 52568 42616
- Unitary authority: Nottingham
- Ceremonial county: Nottinghamshire
- Region: East Midlands
- Country: England
- Sovereign state: United Kingdom
- Post town: NOTTINGHAM
- Postcode district: NG8
- Dialling code: 0115
- Police: Nottinghamshire
- Fire: Nottinghamshire
- Ambulance: East Midlands
- UK Parliament: Nottingham North and Kimberley

Broxtowe is a council estate in the City of Nottingham which is part of the Aspley ward. The estate is located 5 miles (8 km) from the City Centre and lies west of Aspley and Cinderhill, south of Bulwell, east of Strelley and north of Bilborough. At the 2001 census, the estate had a population of 4,847.

== History ==
The name Broxtowe comes from the old Anglo Saxon name Broculstowe, which is thought to refer to a dwelling-place, but the name could refer to the stoe of someone named Brocul. It is also thought that the estate was named after Broxtowe Hall which was located off Broxtowe Lane, but was demolished in 1937.

Construction of the estate commenced in the 1930s, and in 1937, Roman coins and pottery were discovered by the workmen who were engaged in constructing the sewers and the roads for the council estate. It was assumed that the estate was once the site of a Castra, but research proved it was a British hut settlement.

== Religion ==
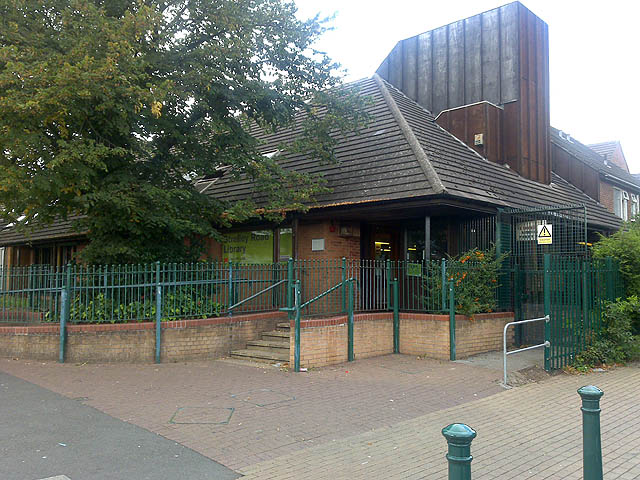
Strelley Road Library

The 2001 Census shows that 53.8% of the estate's population are Christian and Atheists making 35.35 of the population. 0.7% of the population are Muslim and Buddhism, Hinduism and Judaism each score 0.1%. 0.2% of the population are Sikh, other religions make up 0.3% of the population and 9.5% did not state their religion.

Broxtowe has the St Martha the Housewife Parish Church located inside the estate on the corner of Westleigh Road and Frinton Road. In the church's Hope Centre is a statue of Hope by Peter Eugene Ball.

== Demography and ethnic groups ==
According to the data of the 2001 Census, the estate has a population of 4,847, and a majority of the population are aged 25–44, who make up 29.2% of the estate's population.

The census also shows that 90.3% of the estate's population is White British, as well as 1.1% being White Irish, and 0.8% classed as Other White. 3.8% of the population is Mixed Race, 0.9% is Asian or Asian British, 2.6% is Black or Black British, and other ethnic groups making 0.5% of the estate's population.

== Facilities ==
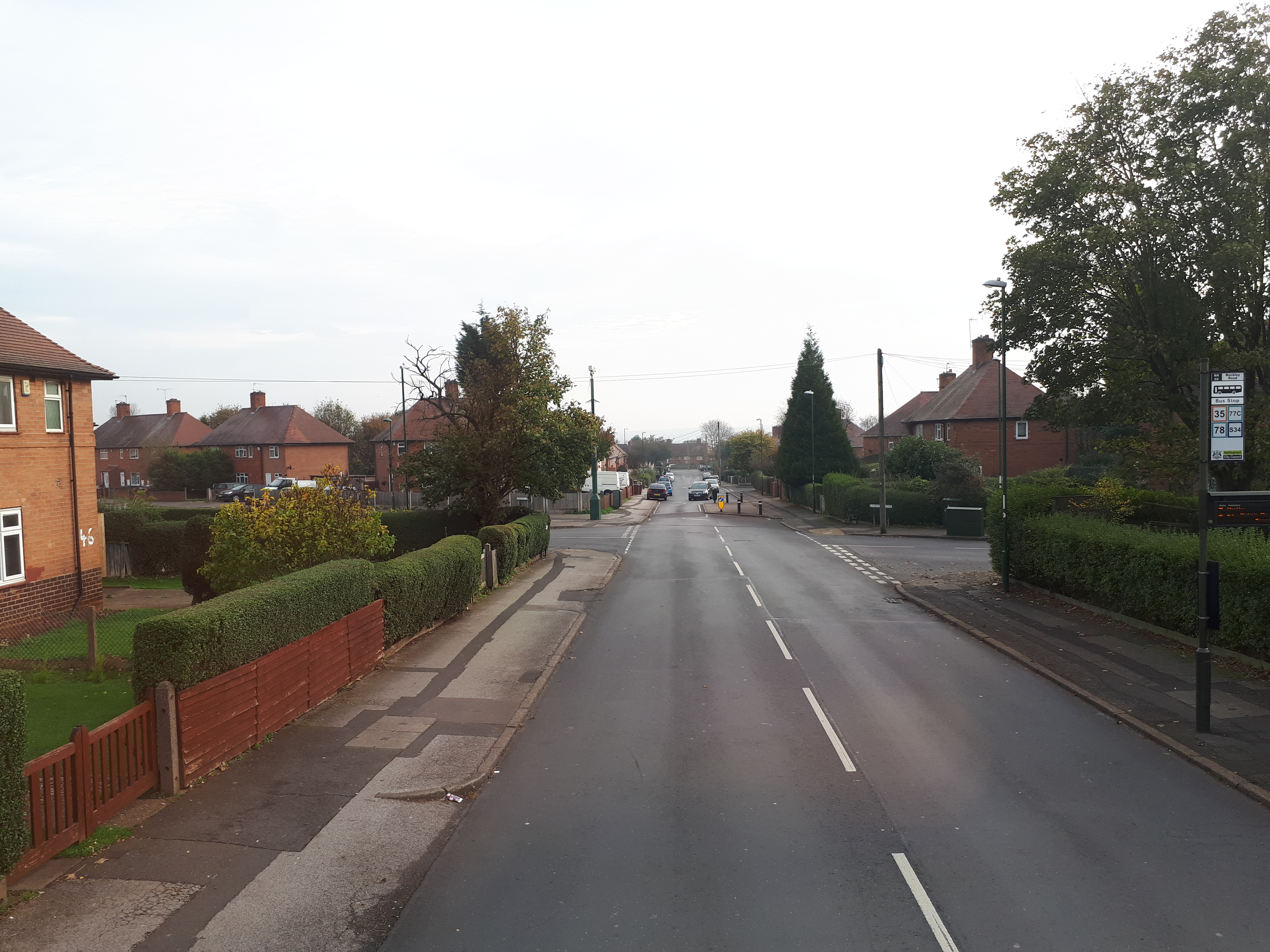
Beckley Road bus stop

Broxtowe has a row of shops and facilities located on Broxtowe Lane, including a post office, convenience store, a Greggs, a Spar store, a barber shop, a pharmacy, a Lloyds Bank, and other facilities located on the corner of Broxtowe Lane and Strelley Road.

== Bus services ==
Broxtowe has frequent bus services run by Nottingham City Transport that travel through the area; the main services include Orange 35 service travels through Bradfield Road and Coleby Road in the direction of Nottingham and Bulwell via Derby Road, Wollaton and Bilborough. The Turquoise 78 travels through Coleby Road and Westleigh Road in the direction of Nottingham and Strelley via Nuthall Road. There are also other services on the Turquoise Line which run during peak times or night services that travel through the estate.
