= Bilborough =

Area of Nottingham, England

Coordinates: 52.965°N 1.228°W

- Suburb
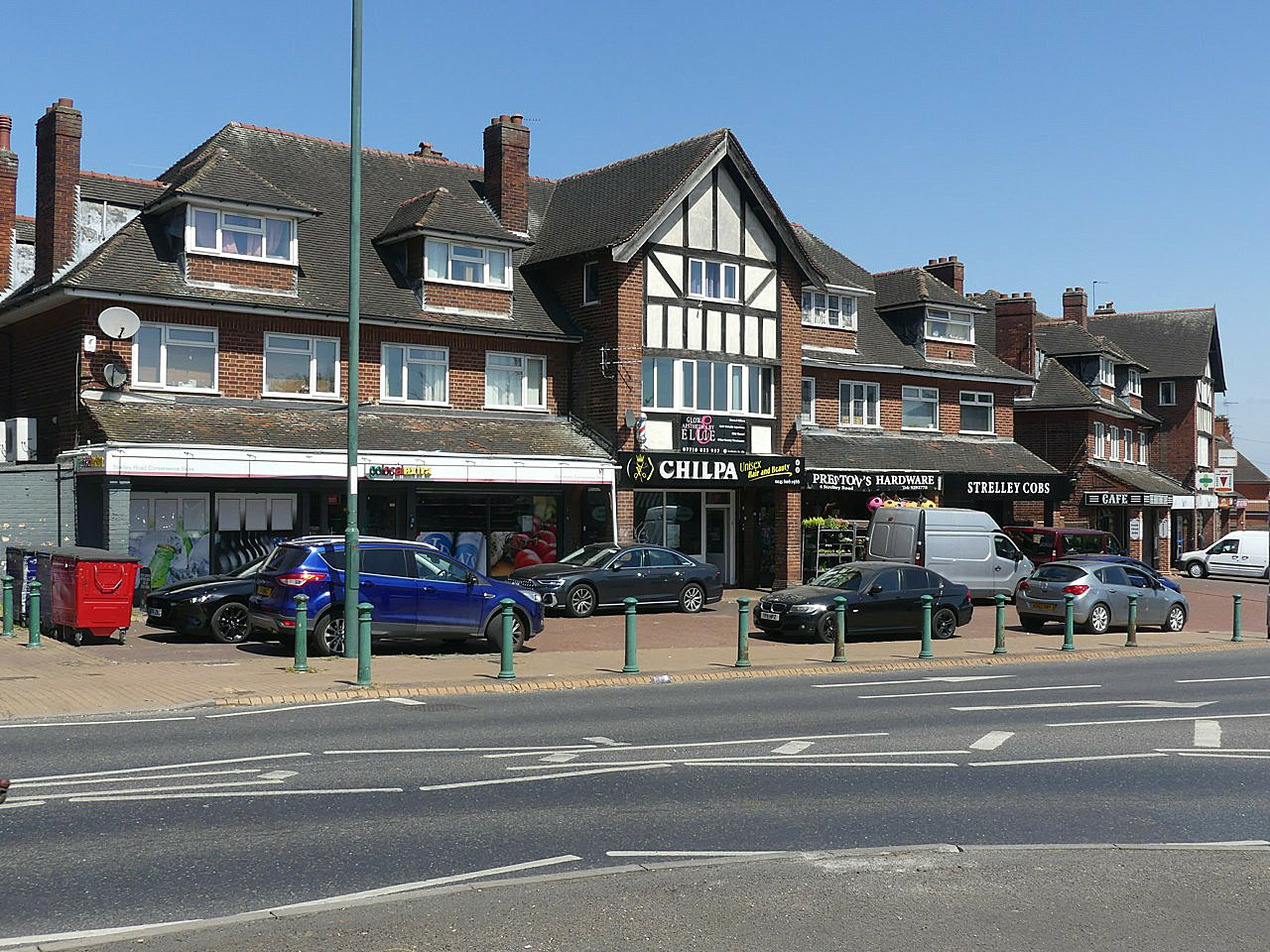
- Strelley Road

- Location within Nottinghamshire
- Population: 16,917
- OS grid reference: SK 51845 41162
- Unitary authority: Nottingham
- Ceremonial county: Nottinghamshire
- Region: East Midlands
- Country: England
- Sovereign state: United Kingdom
- Post town: NOTTINGHAM
- Postcode district: NG8
- Dialling code: 0115
- Police: Nottinghamshire
- Fire: Nottinghamshire
- Ambulance: East Midlands
- UK Parliament: Nottingham South

Bilborough is a suburb of Nottingham, England. The population at the 2021 census was 16,917.

St Martin of Tours' Church, Bilborough is a Grade II listed building. In the chancel is an Annunciation by Evelyn Gibbs, painted in 1946 and rediscovered in 2009 and restored. Located just off the A6002 road is Bilborough College.

== Civil parish ==
In 1931 the parish had a population of 2845. On 1 April 1933 the parish was abolished and merged with Nottingham.

== Education ==
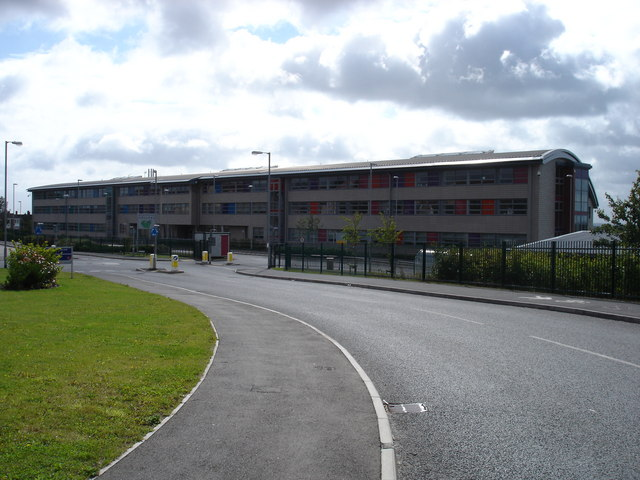
Bilborough College

Bilborough is home to the following schools and colleges:

- Nottingham University Samworth Academy (NUSA), and also is home to Portland, Melbury, Highwood which are all feeders to (NUSA)
- Bilborough College
- Oak Field School
- Bluecoat Beechdale Academy
- Westbury School primary and secondary
- Bluecoat Primary Academy

== Sports ==
Harvey Hadden Stadium is a well known local sport facility with outdoor running track and athletics facilities. The stadium originally had a velodrome.

== Bus services ==
Nottingham City Transport

■ 28: Nottingham → Ilkeston Road → Jubilee Campus → Beechdale → Bilborough

■ 35: Nottingham → Derby Road → QMC → University Park → Wollaton Vale → Bilborough → Strelley → Bulwell

■ 35B: Nottingham → Derby Road → QMC → University Park → Wollaton Vale → Bilborough → Strelley

CT4N

■ L4: Nottingham → Derby Road → QMC → Beechdale → Bilborough → Strelley

== See also ==
- Listed buildings in Nottingham (Bilborough ward)
