= CT4N =

Former community bus operator in Nottinghamshire, England

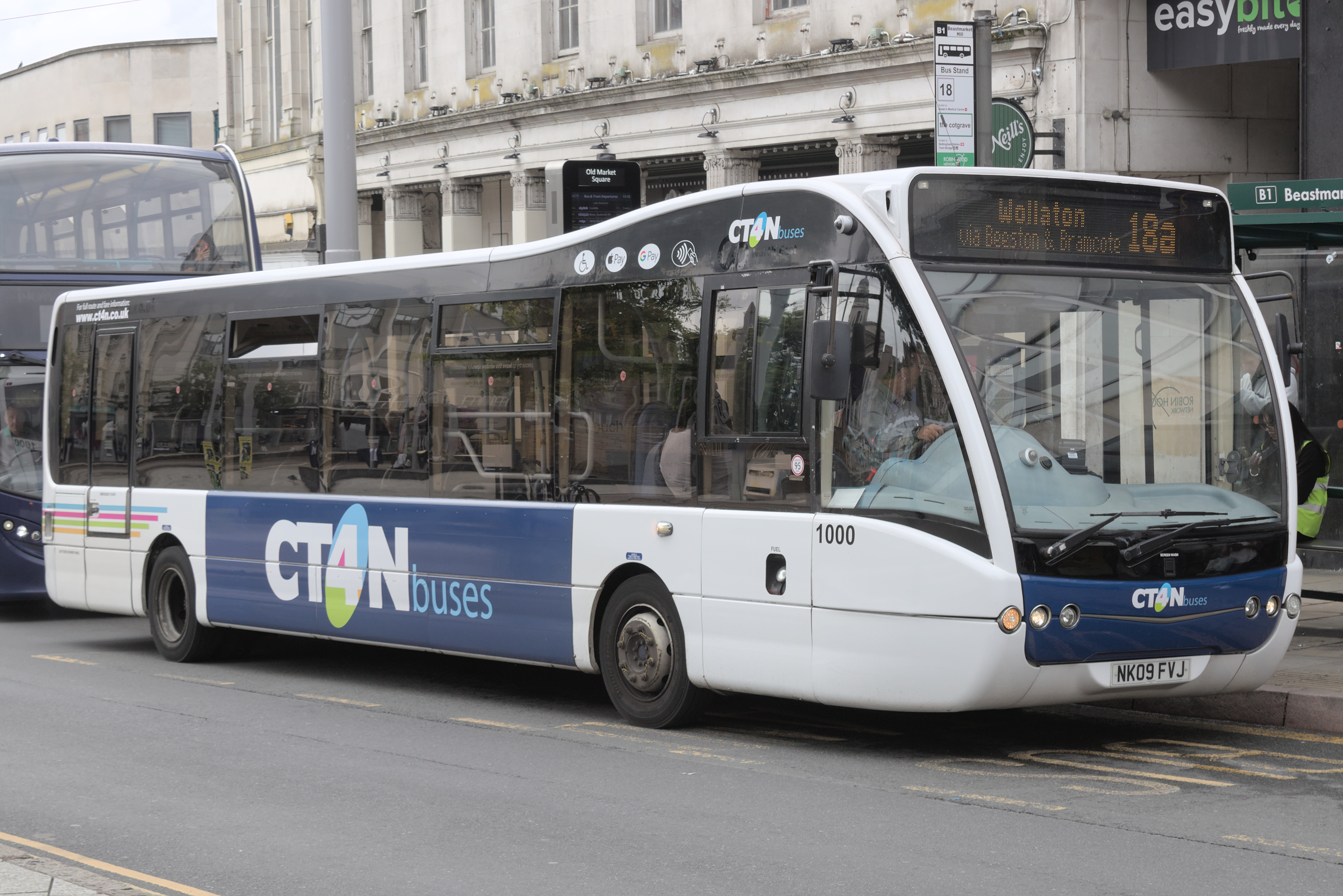
- An Optare Versa in Nottingham (July 2025)
- Founded: 1979 (as Nottingham Voluntary Transport); 2017 (as CT4N)
- Defunct: 14 August 2026
- Headquarters: Nottingham
- Service area: Derbyshire; Nottinghamshire; Leicestershire
- Service type: Bus services
- Depots: 4
- Website: Archived 14 August 2026 at the Wayback Machine

CT4N, formerly known as Nottingham Voluntary Transport and then as Nottingham Community Transport, was a charity and bus operator based in the city of Nottingham, in Nottinghamshire, England. Its legal entity, CT4N Ltd, was a wholly owned subsidiary of the CT4N Charitable Trust, a registered charity that provided transport to reduce social isolation and promote community cohesion across the city and the wider county.

== History ==
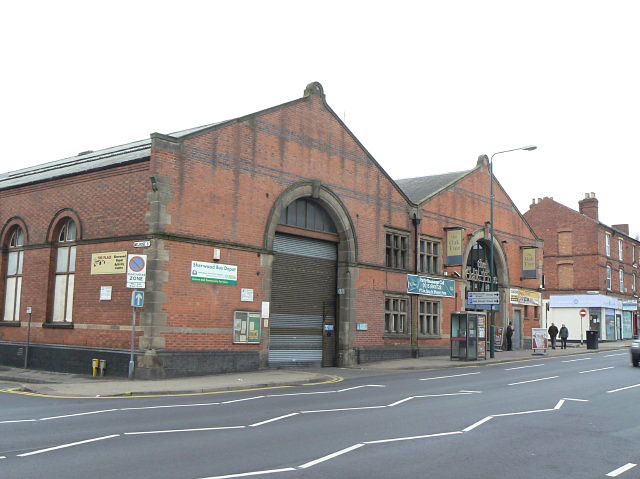
The former Sherwood tram depot is now used by CT4N

CT4N was founded in 1979 as Nottingham Voluntary Transport with four vehicles. In 1988, it became Nottingham Community Transport, a limited company and registered charity. In 1998, it moved to its former headquarters at Sherwood Bus Garage, formerly the Sherwood Tram Depot.

In 2016, CT4N (an acronym for Community Transport for Nottingham) was registered as a new business and would be the trading arm of Nottingham Community Transport. In 2018, CT4N launched officially, with all contracted bus services transferring to the new commercial arm. Nottingham Community Transport purchased a new minibus for the Group Travel service, with support from the Postcode Lottery.

The former headquarters of CT4N was based at the former Sherwood Tram Depot in Nottingham, originally built for Nottingham Corporation Tramways in 1900. CT4N had additional operating bases at the Queens Drive park and ride site in Nottingham, at the East Midlands Gateway and at Mansfield Woodhouse.

On 14 August 2026, all buses were recalled to the depot as CT4N announced they ceased trading after 50 years, quoting rising prices as a factor. Its current routes are to be transferred to other operators, including Nottingham City Transport, Kinchbus, and Littles Travel.

== Services ==
As of August 2026, CT4N operated 24 bus services (including school services) across Nottinghamshire and Leicestershire.

It also operated the Easylink door-to-door service for people who may struggle to use the existing bus and tram services in Greater Nottingham, as well as the On Demand and Connect Shopper services in Derbyshire.

== Criticism ==
In April 2020, a bus driver employed by CT4N died, with COVID-19 symptoms. The firm was accused by the National Union of Rail, Maritime and Transport Workers (RMT) of a "lack of care” towards staff, with its general secretary Mick Cash calling for a Health & Safety Executive investigation. This was amid claims by anonymous staff members to the BBC that, until recently, there had been almost no protocols to protect them from COVID-19, including lack of social distancing signage, insufficient hand sanitiser and drivers still accepting cash payments. CT4N said it had stopped cash handling, operated more buses at peak hours to avoid overcrowding and improved hand-washing facilities.

== See also ==
- List of bus operators of the United Kingdom
