= Nottingham City Transport =

Bus operator in Nottingham, England

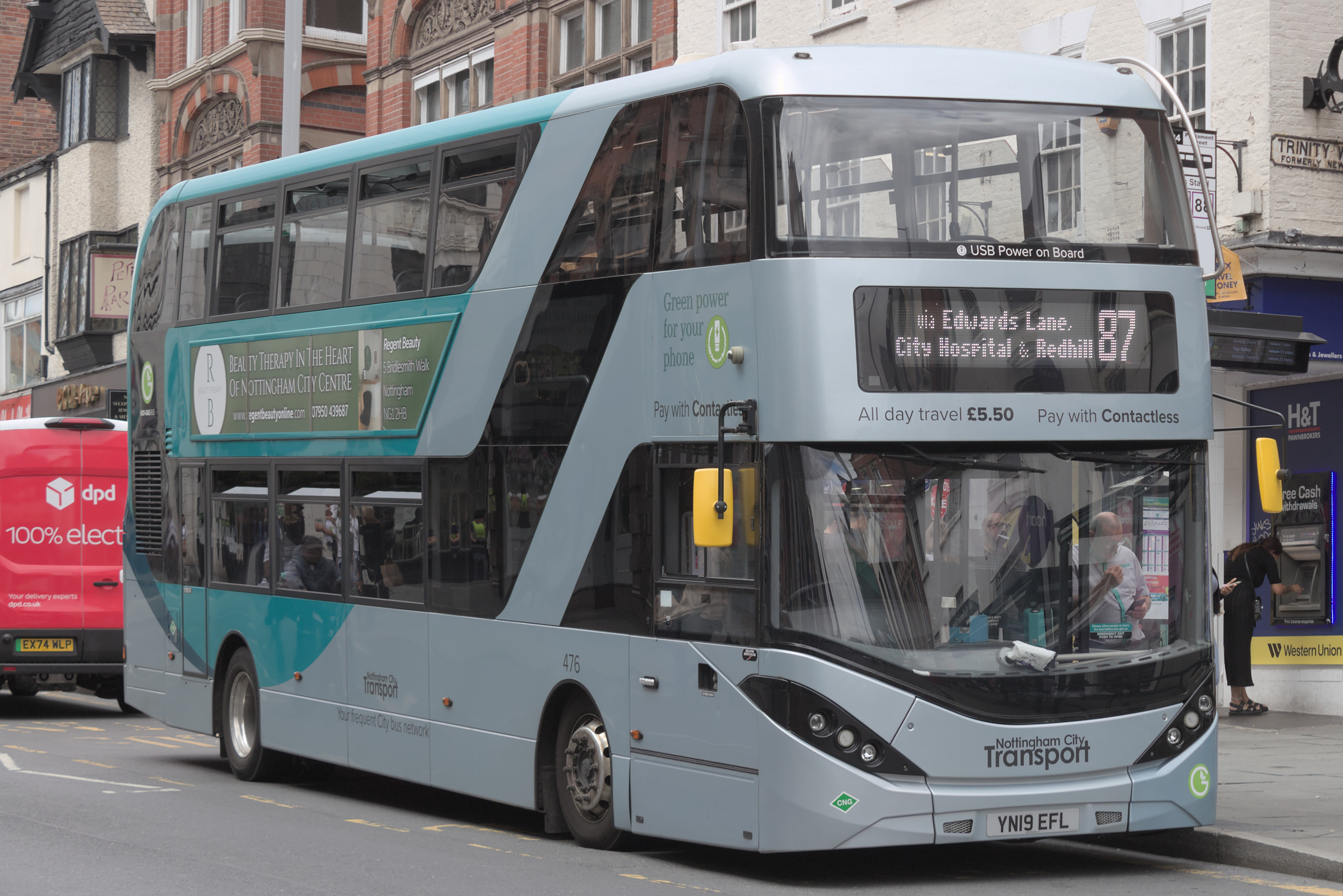
- Alexander Dennis Enviro400 City bodied Scania N280UD on route 87 in Nottingham in March 2025
- Parent: Nottingham City Council 82% Transdev 18%
- Headquarters: Nottingham
- Service area: Nottinghamshire
- Service type: Bus services
- Routes: 52 (89 including variations)
- Depots: 2
- Fleet: 295 (2026)
- Chief executive: David Astill
- Website: www.nctx.co.uk

Nottingham City Transport (NCT) is the major bus operator of the city of Nottingham, England. NCT operates extensively within Nottingham as well as beyond the city boundaries into the county of Nottinghamshire. Publicly owned, it is today the second largest municipal bus company in the United Kingdom after Lothian Buses in Edinburgh, Scotland.

== History ==
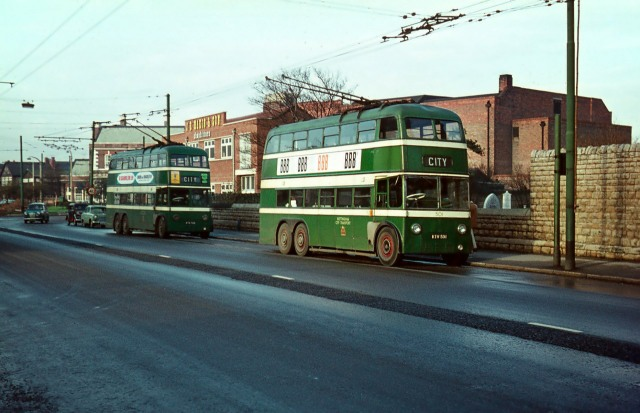
Two British United Traction trolleybuses in Basford in November 1965

Horse-drawn buses operated in Nottingham from 1848. The Nottingham and District Tramways Company Limited opened its first routes in 1878 with horse-drawn trams, and experimented with steam traction a few years later. The company was taken over by Nottingham Corporation Tramways in 1898. Electrification followed, with the first electric trams operating in January 1901 and within two years, over 100 trams were in service on eight lines.

The first motorbuses, three Thornycroft vehicles, were introduced by Nottingham Corporation in 1906. Within two years, however, regular breakdowns led to unreliability against the tram network and their eventual premature withdrawal by the Corporation. Motorbus services restarted twelve years later on 17 May 1920, coinciding with the expansion of Nottingham's boundaries, with three Dennis buses purchased to run a service between the Bulwell tram terminus and Bagthorpe via Gregory Boulevard. A bus depot was opened on Parliament Street in June 1929 and is still in use today.

The Nottingham trolleybus system was inaugurated in 1927, and by 1930, a number of routes had been converted from trams to trolleybuses. The last tram ran in September 1936. By the end of 1937, the trolleybus fleet consisted of 125 vehicles, making it the largest fleet in the country. World War II brought reduced services, economy measures, including diluting diesel with creosote, and blackout screens on vehicles. Before the war, some diesel-engined buses had been introduced, although large scale deliveries of buses did not take place until after the war. The advent of diesel services enabled the last petrol-engined buses to be withdrawn.

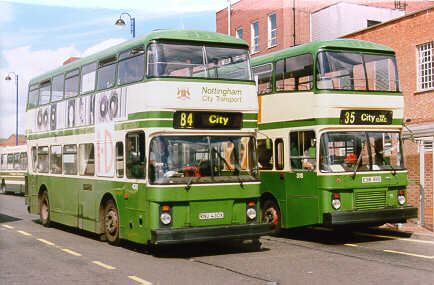
Between 1966 and 1988, Nottingham City Transport specified its own design of bodywork on double-decker buses from several different manufacturers, like this Northern Counties bodied Leyland Atlantean and East Lancashire bodied Volvo Citybus

By the end of the 1950s, trolleybuses were in decline, the last new trolleybus joining the fleet in 1952 reaching a maximum fleet of 155 vehicles. Trolleybuses were withdrawn between April 1965 and July 1966, and the West Bridgford UDC Transport undertaking came under Nottingham's control on 28 September 1968. As a result of local government reorganisation in 1974, Nottingham City Transport was renamed City of Nottingham Transport, and by 1976, an all-time peak of 494 operated vehicles was reached. The last rear-entrance buses were withdrawn in 1977, converting the operator virtually to one-person operation, leaving only services operated jointly with Gotham independent South Notts Bus Company to be operated with bus conductors.

=== Deregulation ===
To comply with the Transport Act 1985, in 1986 the assets of Nottingham City Transport were transferred to a new legal entity. However the company effectively remained in public ownership as Nottingham City Council held full equity of the new entity. In 1988, Stevenson's Bus Services of Ilkeston was purchased, with NCT moving Stevenson's operations into a new subsidiary company, Erewash Valley Services Limited. Erewash's services were later integrated with NCT in 1990.

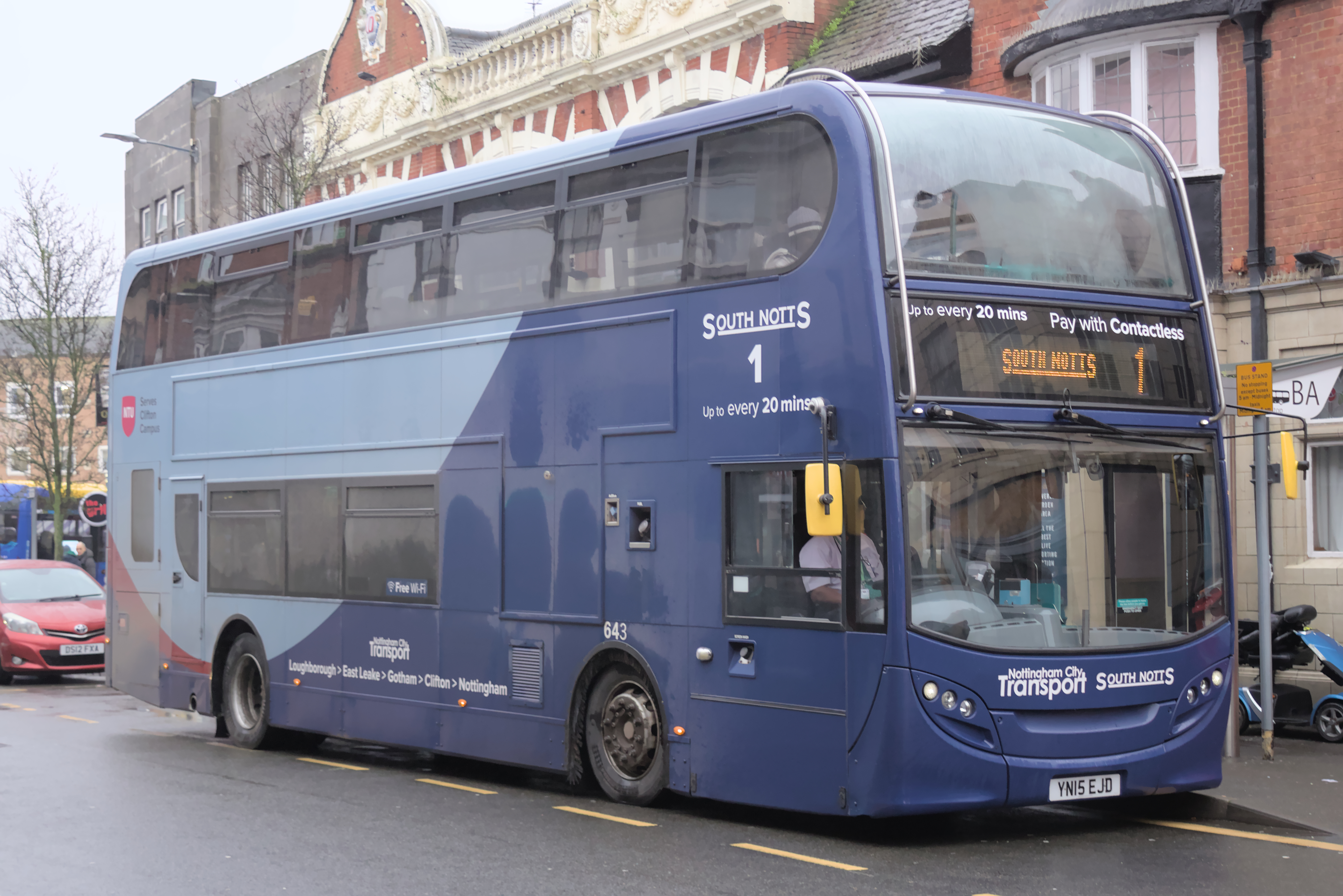
Alexander Dennis Enviro400 bodied Scania N230UD with South Notts branding in Loughborough in January 2026

In 1991, the loss-making South Notts Bus Company was purchased for £1, giving NCT a route from Nottingham to Loughborough and a garage at Gotham. In October 1997, NCT purchased an 80% majority stake in franchise minibus operator Pathfinder (Newark) Limited, giving NCT a presence in the north of the county.

Despite many offers to buy, Nottingham City Council retained 100% ownership in NCT until May 2001, when 5% of the shares were issued to Transdev. This was related to the Nottingham Express Transit operating contract being awarded to Arrow Light Rail, a consortium between Transdev (later Veolia Transdev), Nottingham City Transport, Bombardier, Carillion, Galaxy Research and Innisfree. The consortium was contracted to build and operate the light rail for 30.5 years since 9 March 2004, but the contract was ripped up in March 2011 when Tramlink Nottingham was selected as the preferred bidder for the construction of Phase 2 of the light rail. The last day of operations of Arrow Light Rail was 16 December 2011.

== Fleet ==
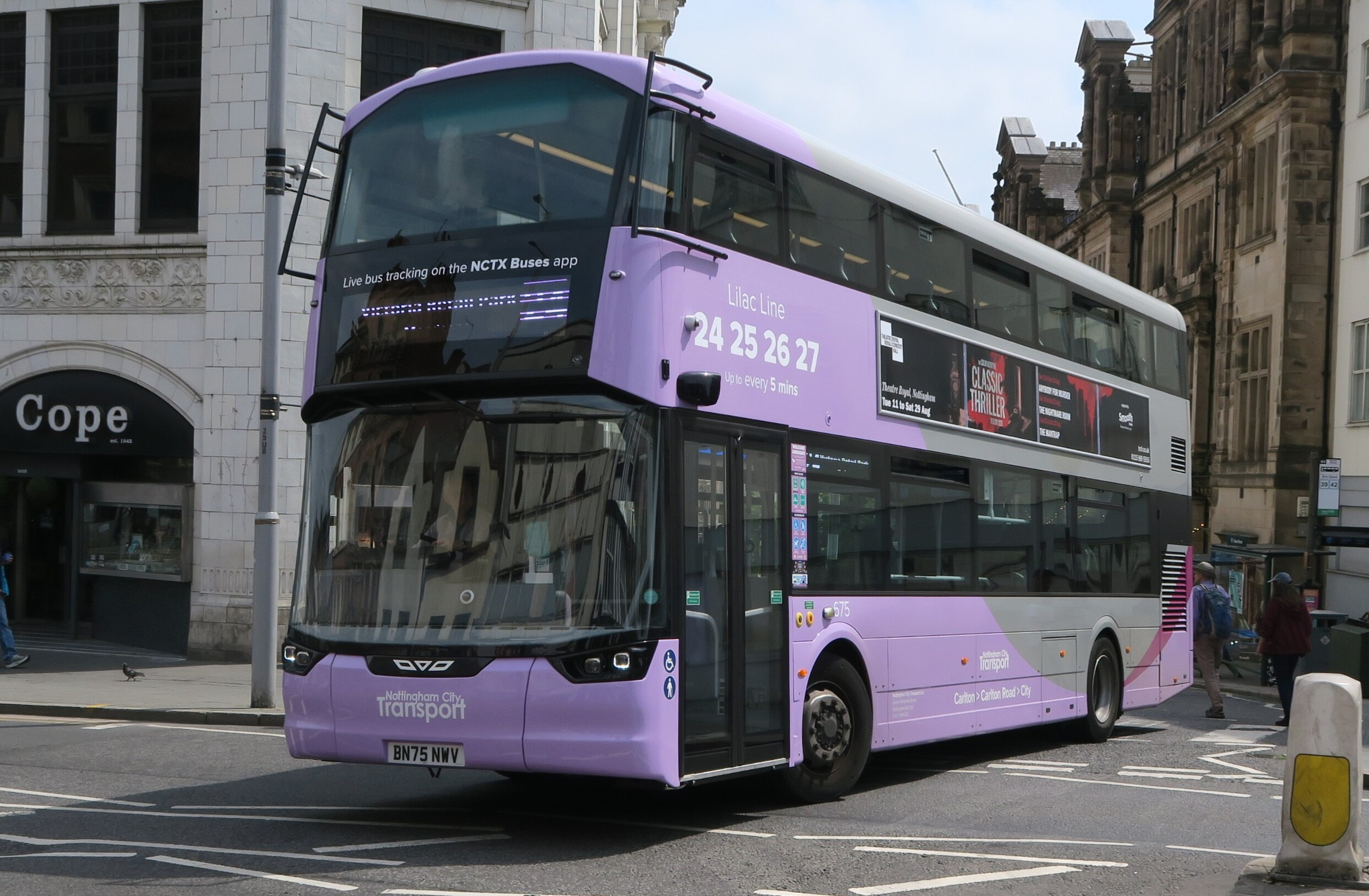
Wright StreetDeck Ultroliner with Pathfinder branding on Upper Parliament Street in June 2026

As of 2026, the Nottingham City Transport fleet consisted of 295 buses, which includes six training buses, based from two depots in Parliament Street and Trent Bridge. Most of this fleet (73%) consists of double-decker buses.

=== Alternative fuels ===
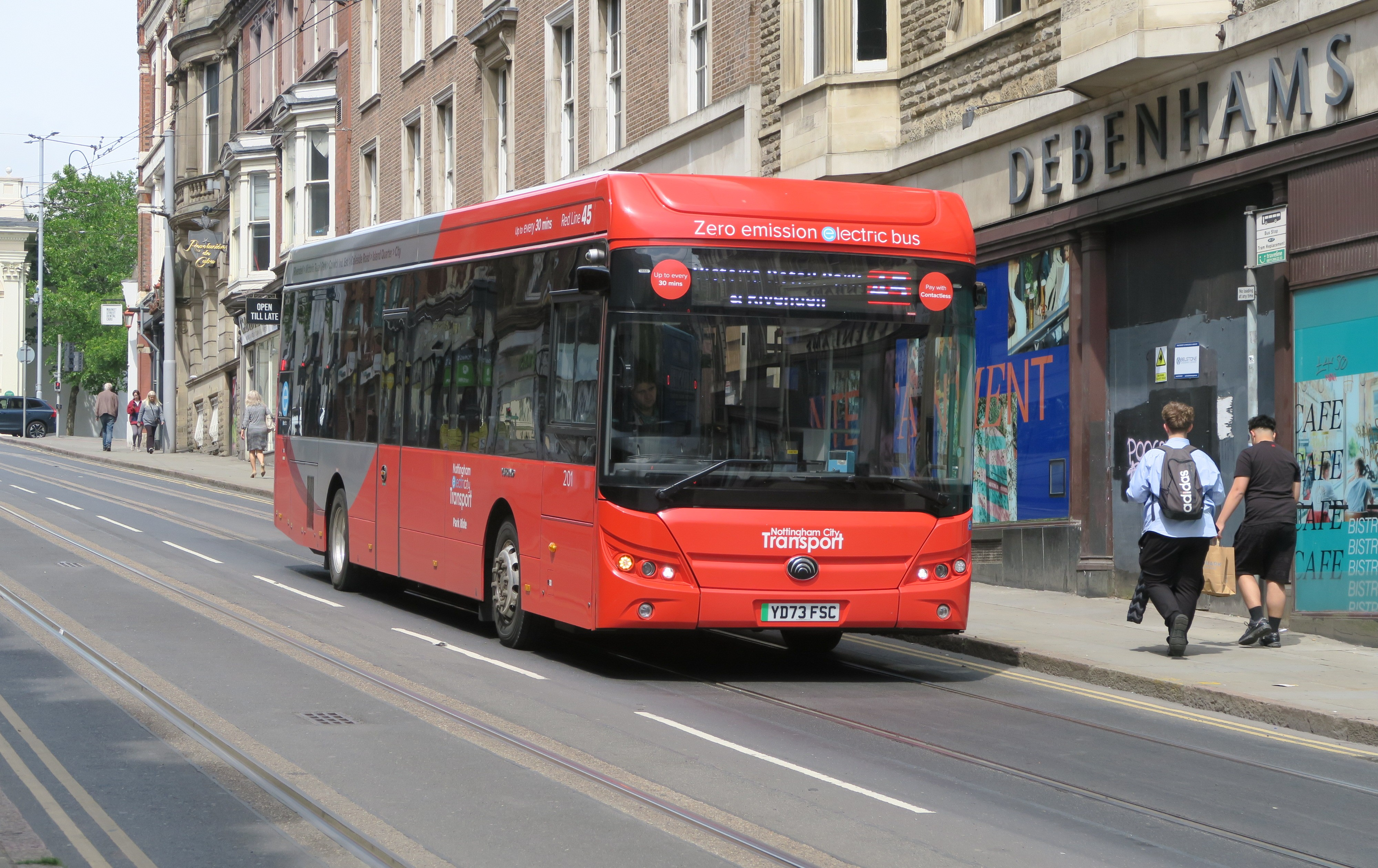
Yutong E10 battery electric bus on Market Street in June 2026

In April 2008, Nottingham City Transport became the first company in the UK to introduce ethanol powered "Eco" buses. Named "Ecolink 30", the service used a combination of standard diesel powered Scania OmniCity buses and three specially converted and green painted ethanol Scania OmniLink buses on its Pink Line 30 route. The buses were purchased by Nottingham City Council with £520,000 of funding from the East Midlands Development Agency, which allowed them to purchase three ethanol powered buses and to construct an ethanol fuelling station, and were operated and maintained by Nottingham City Transport. The trial ended in March 2013 as ethanol became increasingly unviable to source due to taxation policy regarding it as a spirit instead of a fuel. The three buses were converted to diesel and were rebranded for the Pathfinder service to Southwell.

In 2017, Nottingham City Transport won funding from the Office for Low-Emission Vehicles (OLEV) to purchase a fleet of 53 biogas-powered Alexander Dennis Enviro400 City CBG double-decker buses, which were rolled out over 2017 and 2018. By 2018, Nottingham City Transport was operating the largest fleet of biogas-powered buses in the world. In 2019, Nottingham City Transport again successfully bidded for funding from the OLEV to expand the gas refuelling station at its Parliament Street depot, and as a result, more than doubled the gas bus fleet with the delivery of 67 more Enviro400 CBGs. During summer 2022, Nottingham City Transport took delivery of a final order for 23 more Enviro400 CBGs, bringing the operator's total gas bus fleet to 143 of the type.

The operator also announced that they and Nottingham City Council had submitted a business case as part of a bid to the UK government's Zero Emission Bus Regional Areas (ZEBRA) Fund for funding the purchase of 78 battery electric single-deck buses, and the following month they announced that their bid had been successful. The first 22 new electric Yutong E10 and E12s began entering service from NCT's Trent Bridge in April 2024, with further orders being placed for 38 more to be delivered between 2025 and 2026; these buses are intended to replace NCT's entire single-deck fleet at Trent Bridge garage.

== See also ==
- List of bus operators of the United Kingdom
