= Norris Almshouses =

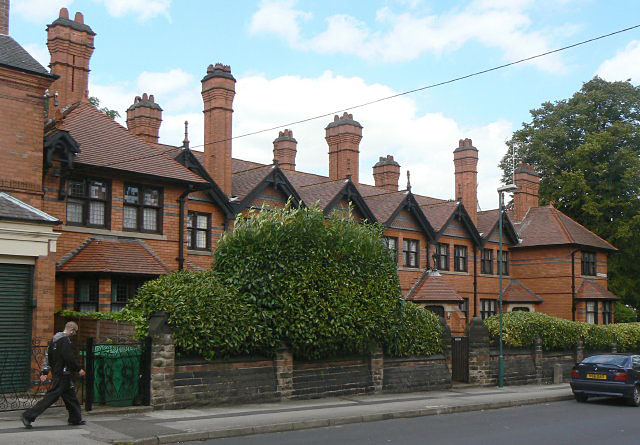

- Location within Nottinghamshire
- 52°58′14.09″N 1°9′32.21″W
- Location: Sherwood Rise, Nottinghamshire, England

History
- Built: 1892
- Built for: Mary Smith Norris

Site notes
- Area: Berridge Road East
- Architect: Fothergill Watson
- Restored: 1991

Listed Building – Grade II

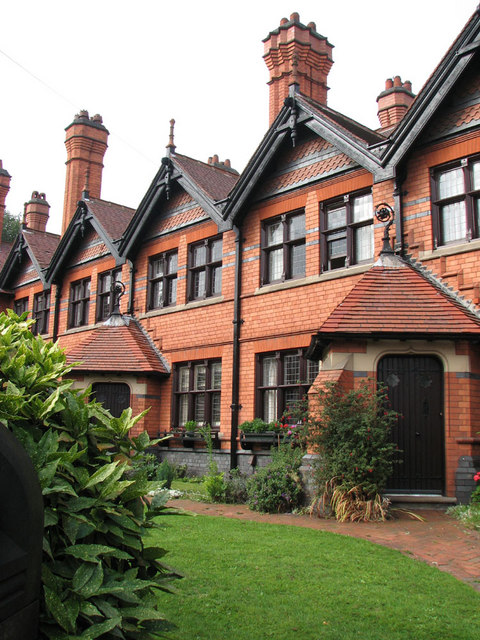
Norris Almshouses

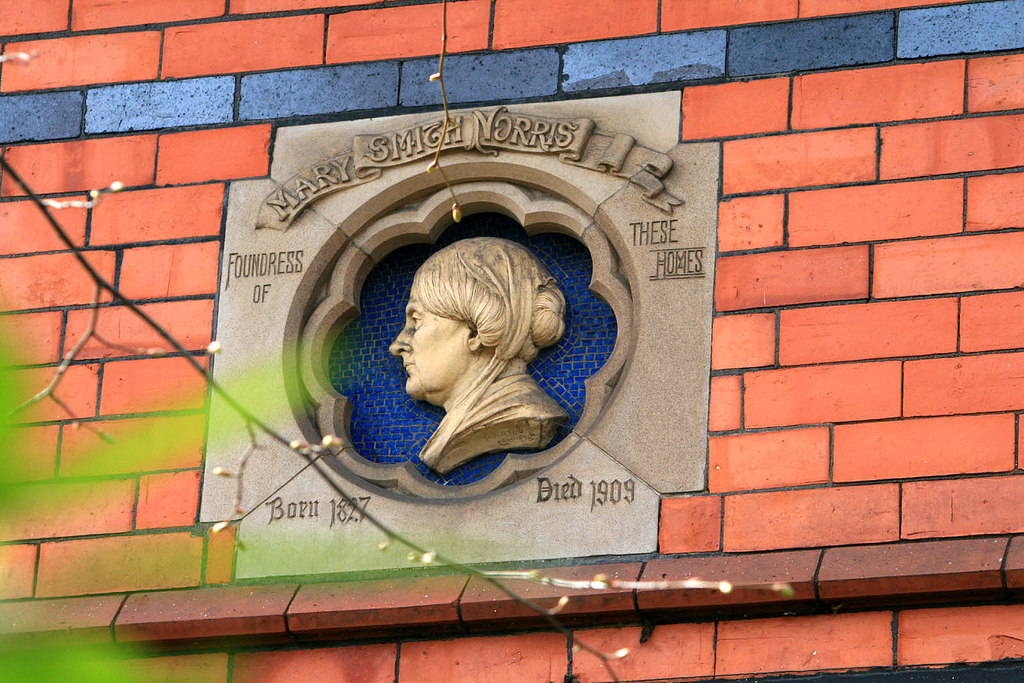
Profile of Mary Smith Norris

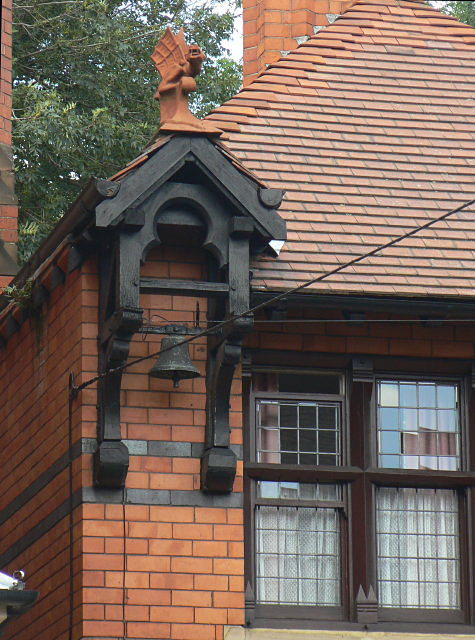
Bell turret on the Norris Almshouses

The Norris Almshouses were erected in 1893 on Berridge Road in Sherwood Rise, Nottinghamshire.

They comprise a row of eight one-bedroom houses for Ladies, designed by the architect Fothergill Watson and paid for by Mary Smith Norris (1827–1909) in 1893 in memory of her brother John Norris.

The charity objectives were to provide a residence available for poor widows or spinsters or married couples of not less than 60 years of age resident in the City of Nottingham or within a distance of 6 miles therefrom. Preferences shall be given to persons so qualified who are members of the Church of England or some orthodox Protestant dissenting denomination.

A restoration in 1991 included the manufacture of hand-cut bricks, a terracota dragon for the roof ridge and a specially commissioned weather cock and sundial.

The almshouses are now managed by Nottingham Community Housing Association and the Norris Homes Charity (236206) which formerly managed the properties was wound up in 2008.
