= Listed buildings in Nottingham (Sherwood ward) =

Sherwood ward is an electoral ward in the city of Nottingham, England. The ward contains 24 listed buildings that are recorded in the National Heritage List for England. All the listed buildings are designated at Grade II, the lowest of the three grades, which is applied to "buildings of national importance and special interest". The ward is a residential district to the north of the city centre, and includes the areas of Sherwood and Carrington. Most of the listed buildings are houses and associated structures, a proportion of which were designed by Watson Fothergill, and the others include churches and associated structures, a former hospital chapel, a school, its wall and gateways, a war memorial gateway, two public houses and an inn sign.

== Buildings ==
Name and location	Photograph	Date	Notes
Woodthorpe Grange; 52.98511°N 1.13242°W		Late 18th century	A house extended in 1874, later offices, in sandstone on a chamfered plinth, with quoins, a moulded sill band, moulded eaves with a balustrade, and hipped slate roofs. There are two storeys and a T-shaped plan, and most windows are sashes. The garden front has three bays, the middle bay recessed and containing a tripartite window with a segmental pediment, flanked by two-storey canted bay windows. On the north front is a Venetian window with a moulded surround, and on the entrance front is a projecting porch with coupled pilasters and a balustrade parapet, containing a round-headed doorway with a fanlight.
Woodthorpe Lodge; 52.98909°N 1.14148°W	—	c. 1820	A house, later extended and converted into flats, it is stuccoed, on a plinth, with a hipped slate roof. There are two storeys, a front range of three bays, and a rear wing with four bays. The doorway is in the return angle, and the windows are sashes.
Woodthorpe House Community Centre; 52.98616°N 1.14340°W		Early 19th century	A house, later converted for other uses, it is stuccoed, and has an artificial slate roof. There is a single storey and three bays, and most of the windows are sashes. On the garden front are two bow windows with deep bracketed eaves and conical roofs, and on the street front is a doorway with columns and a cornice.
The Cedars; 52.98960°N 1.14154°W	—	c. 1830	A house, later used for other purposes, it is stuccoed, on a plinth, with hipped slate roofs. There are two storeys and fronts of three and five bays, and most of the windows are sashes. In the centre of the east front is a canted bay window with a balustrade, on each return is a semicircular bow window with a cornice and a blocking course, and on the south front is a canted bay window. To the left is a three-bay wing with quoins, a balustrade and a bow window. On the entrance front is a stuccoed doorway with pilasters, an entablature and a fanlight, and to the left is a bow window and a round-headed stair window.
Church of St John the Evangelist, Carrington; 52.97561°N 1.15063°W		1841–43	The church was designed by William Surplice, the chancel was added in 1873, and the north aisle, Lady chapel and vestries in 1922–24. It is built in stone with slate roofs, and consists of a nave, a north aisle, north and south porches, a chancel, a Lady chapel and vestries. At the west end is a cross-gabled bell turret, and at the east end are angle buttresses with crocketed pinnacles, and a five-light window. Along the south side of the nave the bays are divided by buttresses, the windows are triple-stepped lancets, and along the top is a trefoil frieze.
Wall, railings and gates, Church of St John the Evangelist, Carrington; 52.97530°N 1.15118°W		1843	The south, east and west sides of the churchyard are enclosed by a wall in Bulwell stone with chamfered coping and wrought iron spearhead railing. To the east is a pair of square stone gate piers with pyramidal stone caps and double gates, to the south are similar piers with a smaller wooden gate, and to the west is a renewed iron gate with iron piers.
Boundary wall and gates, Woodthorpe House Community Centre; 52.98537°N 1.14335°W		c. 1850	The boundary wall is in brick with half-round coping, and consists of a straight length of about 220 metres (720 ft). The wall contains a central segmental-arched gateway with a rounded gable.
Haydn Road Primary School Annexe; 52.97990°N 1.14991°W		1877	The school, designed by Herbert Walker, is in Bulwell stone on a plinth, and has slate roofs with tile crests, and coped gables. There is a single storey and fronts of three bays. Most of the windows have mullions and transoms, those with pointed arches have hood moulds, and there are also lancet windows. On the entrance front is a three-stage square tower porch containing a doorway with a pointed arch and a chamfered surround, above which is a shaped datestone and lancet windows. The bay to the left is gabled and has a triple-slit ventilator.
Boundary wall and gateway, Haydn Road Primary School Annexe; 52.97994°N 1.15035°W		1877	The wall is in Bulwell stone with stepped chamfered coping. It is about 2 metres (6 ft 7 in) high and 120 metres (390 ft) long, and encloses an acute-angled corner site, with a rounded corner. In each range is a small wooden gate with square stone piers.
Clawson Lodge; 52.97644°N 1.15006°W		1885	A house on a corner site designed by Watson Fothergill and later used for other purposes, it is in red brick on a plinth of sandstone and blue brick, with blue brick dressings, timber framing with patterned brick nogging, blue brick bands, and tile roofs. Most of the windows are sashes, some with cross-mullions, and those in the ground floor with segmental heads. On the entrance front is a two-storey canted bay window, and to the right is a two-storey gabled porch, above which is a timber-framed oriel window on stone brackets. On the garden front is an octagonal pavilion with a conical roof, and at the rear is a service wing that has a round tower with a conical roof and a lead finial.
Garden wall and lych gate, Clawson Lodge; 52.97628°N 1.15010°W		1885	The structures were designed by Watson Fothergill. The wall encloses the south and east sides of the garden, it is in rock-faced Bulwell sandstone with rounded coping, and is about 2 metres (6 ft 7 in) high. On the south side is a pair of short buttressed gate piers, with a gabled wooden lych gate with plain tile roof and an iron gate.
409 and 411 Mansfield Road, Carrington; 52.97683°N 1.14972°W		1887	A pair of houses designed by Watson Fothergill, they are in red brick on a plinth, with dressings in black brick and stone, polychrome bands, diapering, and tile roofs with traceried bargeboards to the front gables. There are three storeys, and a T-shaped plan, with a front of four bays, the centre bays gabled. Most of the windows are sashes with mullions and transoms. In the centre bays are canted bay windows with hipped roofs, above which are tripartite windows with shafts, and in the top floor are two-light windows. The outer recessed bays contain porches with hipped roofs in the angles, and on the sides are further porches.
Boundary wall and gateway, 409 and 411 Mansfield Road, Carrington; 52.97678°N 1.14949°W		1887	The boundary wall and gateway were designed by Watson Fothergill. The wall runs along the fronts of the gardens, and is in rock-faced Bulwell stone with rubble coping. At each end is a gateway with square stone piers and shaped caps.
Elberton House; 52.98347°N 1.14796°W		1890	A house on a corner site designed by Watson Fothergill and later divided into flats. It is in red brick on a chamfered plinth, with dressings in stone and blue brick, a moulded sill band, blue brick bands, and a half-hipped tile roof. There are two storeys and attics, and three bays. Most of the windows are sashes or cross-casements. On the entrance front is a recessed porch that has a segmental opening with polychromic voussoirs, to the right is a canted bay window with a lean-to roof on decorative wooden brackets, and on the left corner is a projecting octagonal tower with two stages, an octagonal spire roof and a finial. The left return has a square bay window with a hipped roof, above is a tile-hung gable with a half-hipped dormer, and to the left is a single-storey extension. On the right return is a canted oriel window.
Burlington Towers; 52.98412°N 1.14850°W		1892	The house, later divided into flats, was designed by Watson Fothergill, is in red brick, with timber framing and brick nogging in the upper floor, on a plinth, with dressings in stone and blue brick, string courses and tile roofs. There are two storeys and attics and an L-shaped plan, with fronts of three bays. Most of the windows are sashes. In the centre of the east front is a segmental-arched doorway with a fanlight, and to the right is a two-storey canted bay window. Above this is a timber-framed stage, and a square timber-framed dormer with a bargeboard and a finial. In the return angle at the rear is a small hipped wing, surmounted by a square tower with a pyramidal roof.
Wall and gateway, Burlington Towers; 52.98418°N 1.14855°W		1892	The wall is in rock-faced Bulwell stone with rubble coping. It extends for about 60 metres (200 ft), following a curve around the north and east sides of the house. The wall contains a plain gateway at the west end.
St Luke's chapel, Nottingham City Hospital; 52.98964°N 1.15883°W		1902	The hospital chapel, now disused, is in red brick on a Bulwell stone plinth, with roofs of tile and slate. It has a cruciform plan, consisting of a nave, north and south aisles, porches, north and south transepts, a chancel with an organ chamber, and a southwest tower. The tower is round, with an embattled parapet, and a recessed copper-clad needle spire and finial. At the west end is a full-width porch with a lead roof, and rounded steps leading to a double doorway, and above it is a semicircular nine-light window. At the east end is a round-arched window with seven lights flanked by three-light mullioned windows, and in the nave roof is a box dormer with four mullioned windows.
413 to 419 Mansfield Road, Carrington; 52.97702°N 1.14955°W		1906	A block of four houses designed by Watson Fothergill, they are in red brick, the top floor timber framed with rendered infill, on a plinth, with dressings in blue brick and stone, angle buttresses, cogged eaves and tile roofs. There are three storeys and four bays, the left three bays gabled, and the right bay an engaged corner tower with a pyramidal roof. The windows are a mix of sashes and casements with mullions and transoms. In the centre are two doorways with pointed-arched heads, flanked by canted bay windows. Across the left corner is a bay window, and on the right return is a canted oriel window.
Gateways and boundary wall, 413 to 419 Mansfield Road, Carrington; 52.97697°N 1.14936°W		1906	The boundary wall is in Bulwell stone with rubble coping. It runs along the fronts of the house for about 25 metres (82 ft), then along Bingham Road for about 20 metres (66 ft). The wall contains four small gateways, and at the left end is a larger square gate pier with a pyramidal cap flanking a carriage entrance.
Scout War Memorial Gateway; 52.98507°N 1.15909°W		1927	The gateway was built to commemorate the scouts who were lost in the First World War. The entrance is gabled, and timber framed with herringbone red brick nogging, the roof is tiled with timber fascia boards, and the gateway is flanked by brick walls with tile coping. Attached to the timber lintel of the gates is an inscribed plaque, and above, in the gable, is another plaque. Behind the gateway is an avenue of trees leading to a scout hut with an inscribed plaque.
St Martin's Church, Sherwood; 52.98452°N 1.14177°W	—	1935–37	The church is in buff brick with Roman tile roofs, and is in Byzantine style. It consists of a nave and a chancel with a clerestory under a continuous roof, a half-domed apse, a vestry, a north chapel, aisles, an organ chamber, and a narthex with three arched doorways. Most of the openings have round-arched heads and rebated surrounds. At the west end are dentilled eaves, and a round window with mullions forming a Maltese cross.
The Vale Hotel; 52.99368°N 1.13849°W		1935–37	The public house was designed by T. Cecil Howitt. It is in pale brick on a stone plinth, with stone dressings, a sill band, coped parapets, and a hipped tile roof. There are two storeys and single-storey wings. At the front, the ground floor projects, and contains six tall cross-casement windows, recessed at the sides are porches, and the side wings are blind on the front. On the north and south fronts are projecting single-storey wings with a semicircular bow window.
Pub sign, The Vale Hotel; 52.99363°N 1.13877°W		1935–37	The sign in the forecourt of the public house was designed by T. Cecil Howitt. It is in stone, and consists of a fluted Doric column on a circular base with curved bench seats. At the top is a capital, and a bronze three-sided lantern with sign boards.
Former Fiveways Public House; 52.98928°N 1.14925°W		1936–37	The public house, later used for other purposes, has a ground floor in limestone, and the upper parts have applied timber framing with rendered infill. The roofs are in Swithland slate, and have display gables with carved bargeboards. There are two storeys and an L-shaped plan, with an angled gabled bay on the corner, and single-storey extensions. On the front is a doorway with a moulded surround, and to its right is a canted bay window, above which is a gable with a foliage frieze and pierced bargeboards.
