= Jason Spencer (disambiguation) =

Jason Spencer (born 1974) is an American politician and physician assistant.

Jason Spencer may also refer to:

- Jason Spencer (murder victim) (1989–2007), an English teenager who was stabbed to death
- Jason Spencer, founding member of the American band Wilson
- Jason Spencer, Australian who won the 2010 Sir Peter Ustinov Television Scriptwriting Award
- Jason Spencer, American baseball player. Florida State University, St Louis Cardinals
