= St Martin's Church, Sherwood =

Coordinates: 52.9845°N 01.1419°W

- St Martin's Church, Sherwood
- Denomination: Church of England
- Churchmanship: Broad Church
- Website: www.stmartinsherwood.org

History
- Dedication: Saint Martin

Administration
- Province: York
- Diocese: Southwell and Nottingham
- Parish: Sherwood

Clergy
- Vicar: Revd Sue Pendenque

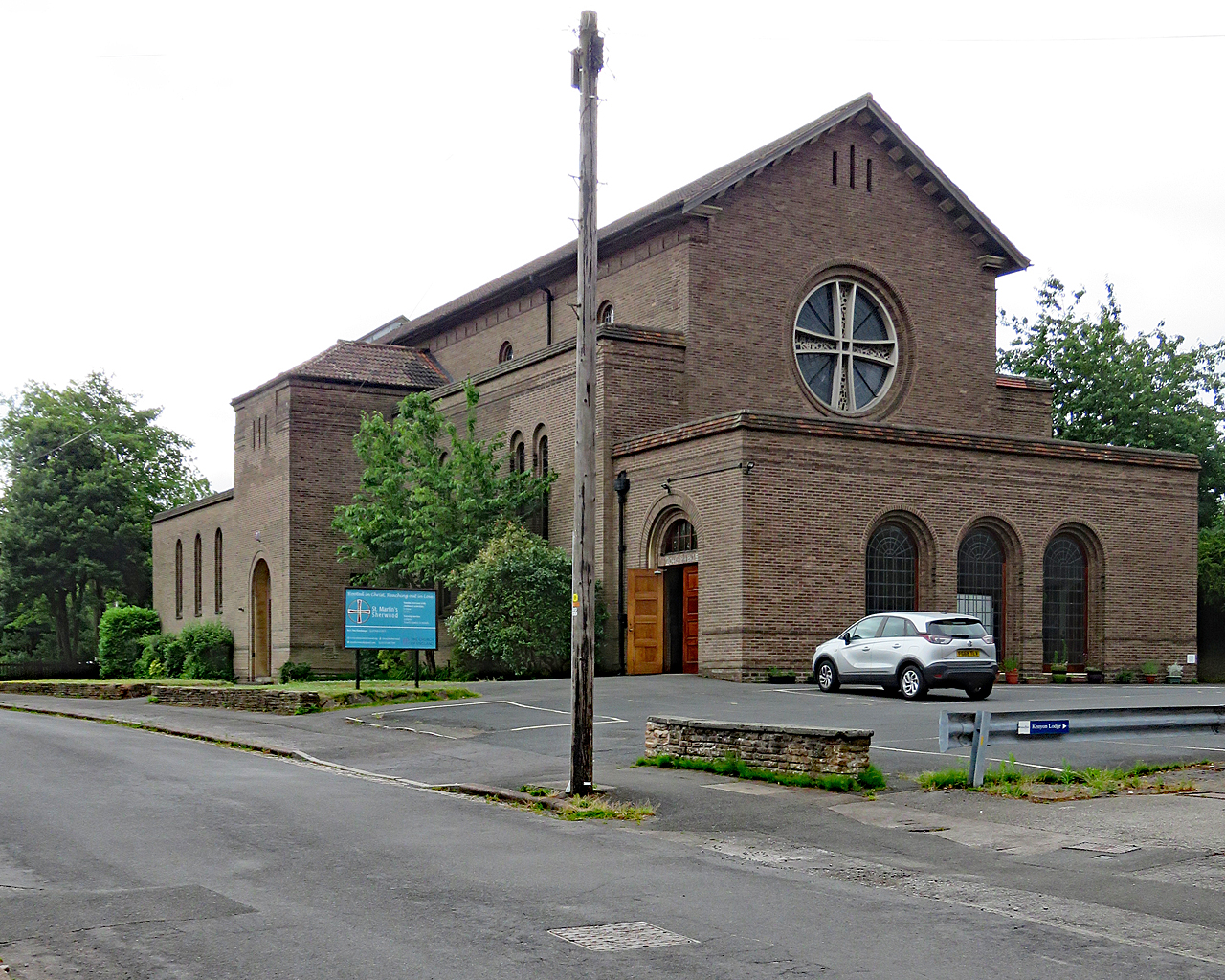
St Martin's Church in 2025

St Martin's Church is a grade II listed Church of England parish church in Sherwood, Nottingham.

== History ==
It was first opened in 1937 to the design of Edward Heazell in the Byzantine style. The church was consecrated by the Bishop of Southwell Re Revd Henry Mosley on 6 February 1937.

The consecration of the church was overshadowed by the death of the verger and his wife. Mrs. Bradley died on Saturday 6 February 1937, and Mr. John Bradley died the day afterwards.

The church provides food provisions through the Nourish Sherwood Project, Jolly Tots for Toddlers, and Bumps to Babies in midweek. Worship happens at 8:30 and 10:30 most Sundays with "Unplugged worship" at 18:00 often on the fourth Sunday of the month.

== Incumbents ==
- Revd Edward Lysons
- Revd William Willatt 1955
- Revd Timothy Tyndall 1960
- Revd Ian Gatford 1975
- Revd Christopher Gale 1984
- Revd Sylvia Griffiths 1999
- Revd Bridget Baguley 2017
- Revd Sue Pendenque 2024

== Organ ==
A pipe organ was installed in 1937 by Harrison and Harrison. It was originally installed in St. Luke's Church, Chelsea in 1907.

=== Organists ===
- Kendrick Partington 1947–1950 (later organist of St Peter's Church, Nottingham
- Mr. Vivian Grainger 1950–1960
- Martin Barrett 2008–2015 (Worship group leader, keyboardist and organist)
- Richard Marsden 2015–2021

== See also ==
- Listed buildings in Nottingham (Sherwood ward)

== Sources ==
- The Buildings of England, Nottinghamshire, Nikolaus Pevsner
