= Nottingham and District Tramways Company =

Defunct tramway operator

Nottingham and District Tramways Company Limited
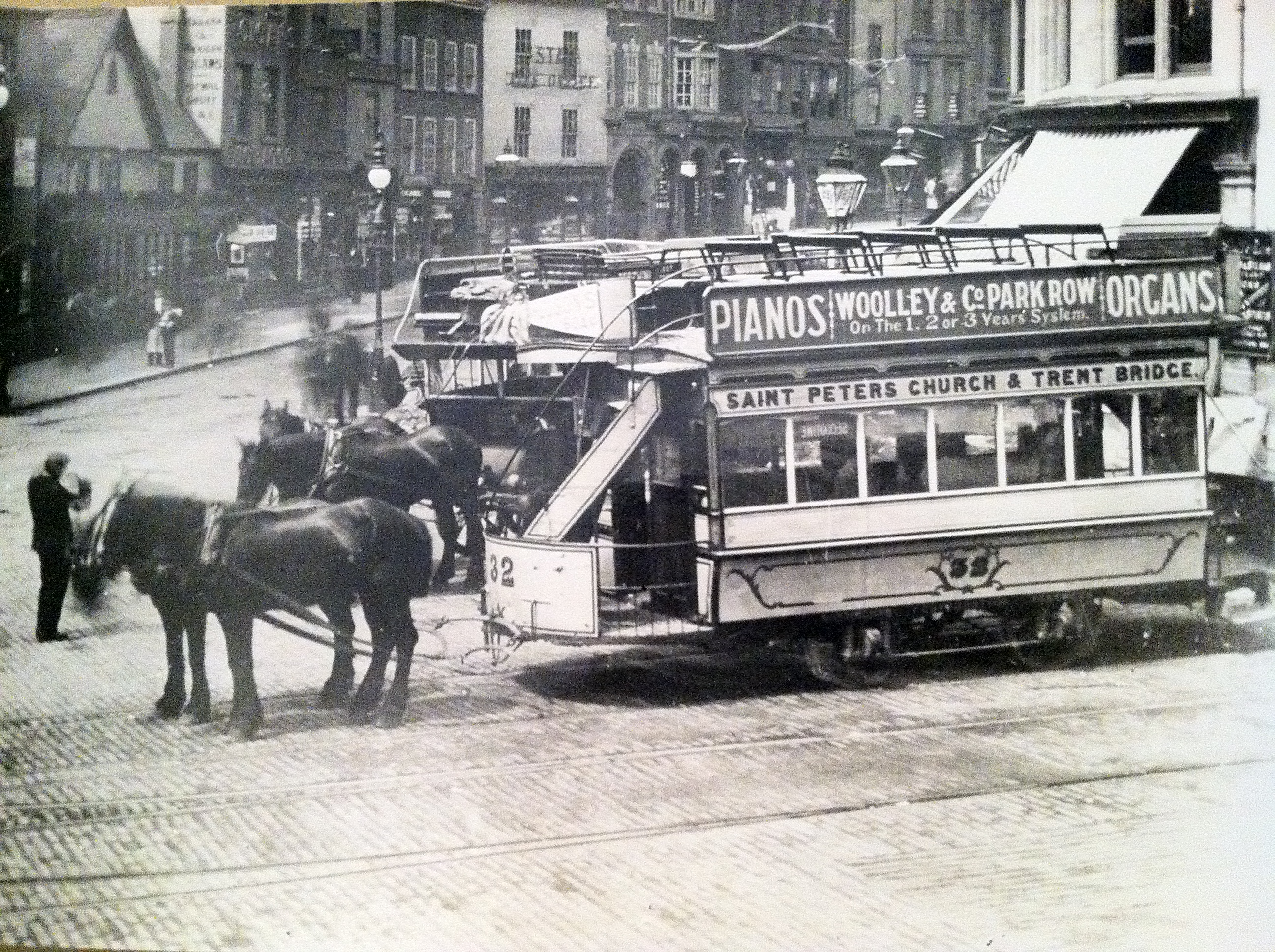
- Nottingham Horse Tram outside St. Peter's Church, Nottingham

Operation
- Locale: Nottingham
- Open: 17 September 1878
- Close: 30 April 1902
- Status: Closed

Infrastructure
- Track gauge: 1,435 mm (4 ft 8 1/2 in)
- Propulsion system: Horse

Statistics
- Route length: 6.325 miles (10.179 km)

Nottingham and District Tramways Company Limited was a tramway operator from 1875 to 1897 based in Nottingham in the United Kingdom.

== Nottingham Tramways Company 1872-1875 ==
Plans for tramways in the town of Nottingham started at least as early as 1870 and sufficient progress was made by several prominent business men to formally establish the Nottingham Tramways Company in 1872. The corporation Highways Committee reported on 8 January 1872 that the Nottingham Tramways Company Limited has asked for consent to an application to the Board of Trade for a provisional order authorising them to construct tramways to Arnold, Beeston, Bulwell and Carlton. No plans for this proposed network survive in the local archives in Nottingham.

In November 1872 the company issued notice that they intended to submit a bill to Parliament for the operation of tramways in Nottingham. The proposed network made no mention of Arnold or Beeston but comprised a line from a terminus on Forest Road at its junction with Mount Hooton Road, east along Forest Road, then Mansfield Road, Melbourne Street, Milton Street, Upper Parliament Street, Market Street, Wheeler Gate, Albert Street, and then Carrington Street to the junction with Station Street. From this junction one line would run along Station Street and across London Road into the forecourt of the Great Northern Railway station and another along Arkwright Street to Trent Bridge.

At the same time the company also issued notice that they intended to submit an application to the Board of Trade for a much larger network . These included lines to run along Mansfield Road to its junction with Broadmere Lane, along Chapel Bar, Derby Road, Alfreton Road, Hyson Green Road, Radford Road, David Lane and a terminus in Mill Street; on Derby Road to the intersection with the railway crossing at Lenton Station; along Woodborough Road, Alfred Street and Carlton Road to a terminus at the junction with Oldham Street; the whole length of Forest Road, Basford Road, Elm Avenue and a terminus in High Church Street.

The submission to the Nottingham Corporation was successful, and the plans were approved on 7 November 1872, but it seems that the application to the Board of Trade failed. In November 1873, the company submitted revised proposals to the Board of Trade for the lines running south of St. Peter's Church. These revisions downgraded the proposals and included single-line working for Station Street and Arkwright Street. The line in Station Street was proposed to terminate just before the junction with London Road, rather than cross it to enter the forecourt of the Great Northern Railway station. The records of the corporation reveal that at a meeting on 2 February 1874

the Council consent to the Nottingham Tramways order 1874 becoming law". Town Clerk reports that previous application of the company failed; this is a much restricted one, dealing with two lines only: (1) from St Peter's Square along Carrington Street to the east end of Station Street. (2) from the junction of Station Street and Carrington Street along Arkwright Street to the Union Inn on London Road. (1) is a partly double line, partly single. (2) is single only. Clauses are included in the order for workmen's fares (2d instead of 3d) before 7am and after 5.30pm

== Nottingham and District Tramways Company Limited 1875-1897 ==
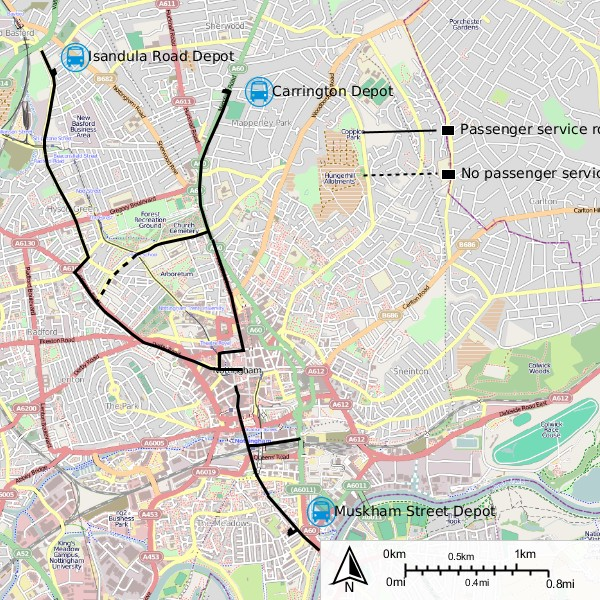
Map of the routes and depots as finally developed

In 1875, the company name was changed to the Nottingham and District Tramways Company Limited. This was before the Nottingham Borough Extension Act 1877 (40 & 41 Vict. c. xxxi) when the town extended its boundary to encompass Basford, Radford, Sneinton and Lenton. Again it seems that there were problems, for in November 1876 the company came up with a further proposal. This proposal comprised the following lines

1. Long Row then Market Street, Upper Parliament Street, Milton Street, Melbourne Street and Mansfield Road, terminating opposite the south east corner of St. John's Church, Carrington. 1 mile 6 furlongs 5.7 chains (3,205 yards).
2. From a junction with tramway 1 in the Market Place at the corner of Market Street, then along Angel-row, Chapel Bar, Tollhouse Hill, Derby Road, Alfreton Road, Hyson Green Road and Radford Road, terminating on Radford Road at the junction with Wood Street. 2 miles 2 furlongs 8.7 chains (4,151 yards).
3. The length of Forest Road connecting tramways 1 and 2. 6 furlongs 1.76 chains (1,359 yards).
4. St. Peter's Square, Albert Street, Lister Gate, and Carrington Street to the east end of Station Street. 5 furlongs 1.85 chains (1,141 yards).
5. From a junction with tramway 4 at the junction of Station Street and Carrington Street along Arkwright Street to the Union Inn on London Road. 5 furlongs 8 chains (1,276 yards).

The plans make no reference to locations of the depots, nor crossings or passing places. Rather vaguely, the wording of the application for a provisional order states:

The Provisional Order will also empower the promoters from time to time to make such crossings, passing-places, siding, junctions, curves, turnouts, and other works, in addition to those particularly specified in this notice as may be necessary or convenient to the efficient working of the proposed tramways, or any of them, or for providing access to any stables or carriage-houses or works of the promoters, and will empower the promoters to use carriages on the proposed tramways to be moved by animal or any other locomotive power. . .

The total length of the routes outlined in the plans is 6.325 miles (11,132 yards) or 6 miles 2 furlongs and 6 chains (some double track, some single). The report presented to the third annual general meeting of the shareholders in 1880, shows that the company purchased approximately 10 miles 6 furlongs and 4 chains of rail. Some of this rail would have been necessary for the depots and connections into the depots, and some kept for repairs and renewals.

The Board of Trade made a provisional order for the scheme, known as the Nottingham and District Tramways Order 1877, and this was confirmed in the Tramways Orders Confirmation Act 1877 (40 & 41 Vict. c. cxxiv) for which royal assent was received on 23 July 1877. The company was authorised to operate animal-drawn trams only, in the borough of Nottingham and also in the districts of Lenton, Basford and Radford. These districts were not included in the Borough of Nottingham until the Nottingham Borough Extension Act 1877 (40 & 41 Vict. c. xxxi). The Nottingham and District Tramways Order 1877 also specified the minimum levels of service that the company was required to operate: to run carriages each way every morning in the week and every evening in the week (Sundays, Christmas Day and Good Friday always excepted), at such house, not being later than seven in the morning or earlier than six in the evening respectively.

The track was of the Winby and Levick system and consisted of flat-bottomed, grooved tramway-type rails laid longitudinally on broad iron plates, which in turn rested on consolidated macadam or other road material; this was believed to make up a sufficient foundation without concrete. Nottingham was the first installation of this newly patented system. The base plates were 12 inches wide and inch thick in lengths 11 feet 11 inches long, and were laid continuously in order to avoid the plate joints and the rail joints coming together, as the rails were in 24 ft (7.3 m) lengths. [The rail length figure reported in the Nottingham Evening Post is 27 ft.] The base plate length of 11 ft 11 inches and track length of 24 feet (7.3 m) would allow a run of nearly two miles of track before the plate joints and the rail joints came together]

The cost of laying the track was £1,974 (equivalent to £199,000 in 2025), a mile and the contract for laying the rails was placed with Ridley and Company. The paving works cost £2,559 (equivalent to £257,900 in 2025), per mile and this was undertaken by the Nottingham Corporation.

=== The Southern Route ===
On Wednesday 11 September 1878 the tramway company performed a test run:

Yesterday the Nottingham Tramways Company made an experiment for running the No. 1 car for the inspection of the directors prior to the opening for the public, which event will in all probability take place on Saturday next. At ten o'clock in the morning the car was "in waiting" near the Walter Fountain, and being a novelty in Nottingham, and splendidly fitted up also, a crowd of interested spectators soon gathered around for minute inspection. Under the impression that the car was being opened to the public, many persons jumped inside, though, to their disappointment, they were politely requested to retire until Saturday next.

At about 10.30 Mr. Alderman Gilpin, chairman of the company, and several other directors made their appearance, and a few minutes later the car, drawn by a couple of powerful horses, went sliding along Carrington-street to the Midland and nearly to the Great Northern Railway Stations. Pleased with the sight, the people ran by the side of the car and not a few hailed the conductor to stop and take them up. Having returned to the end of Station-street, the car was run along Arkwright-street to the Trent Bridge. Considering that the metals are new and not so clean as they will be kept in a few days, the car went along very pleasantly indeed.

The whole of the road which is now completed, and which is known as the No. 1 Section, is about a mile and a half in length. The other day, the Government inspector, Colonel Majendi, went over the line, and having pronounced it to be satisfactory, a certificate is expected to arrive in a day or two As this is the district from which most of the traffic is expected to come, cars, capable of carrying out-side as well as inside passengers will in all probability be used in the future, though at present the eight vehicles provided are for inside passengers only. The line is double all the way, and the traffic which is expected will render the running practically continuous. The fare will be twopence all the way.

In Carrington-street and Station-street the road is sufficiently wide to allow ordinary vehicle traffic on either side of the trams, though in Arkwright-street the aspect of the road shows pretty clearly that some difficulty will arise. If a cab is drawn at the side of the road one of the wheels must be drawn at the least a foot upon the footway, otherwise a collision will be inevitable. The same difficulty applies to both side of the way, and as traffic is great in Arkwright-street, the double line will be rather awkward unless the foot-way is reduced.

The depot of the company, which is a newly-erected building off Arkwright-street, is complete to the detail, the stables being capable of accommodating 50 or 60 horses. The rooms are lofty and well ventilated, and certainly the core of horses which we saw yesterday were well worth of the home which they now realise. A finer set of cattle it is scarcely possible to conceive, and cannot fail to win the admiration of the people.

The tramway was formally opened on 17 September 1878 (although services for the public were delayed for a day awaiting the arrival of the certificate from the Board of Trade). At 3:00 pm three cars, decorated with flags, made an inaugural run from St Peter’s church to Trent Bridge. They carried the company chairman, Alderman Gilpin, the company manager, Mr Gideon Herbert, the mayor of Nottingham, Sir James Oldknow, Saul Isaac MP, the vicar of St. Mary's, Canon Francis Morse and other invited guests.

The progress of the party was watched with lively interest by some thousands of spectators assembled along the whole route, particularly in St. Peter's Square. The route taken was from outside the company offices in St Peter’s Square along Albert Street, Lister Gate, Carrington Street and the Station Street terminus, where the party turned round and came back along Station Street to Muskham Street via Arkwright Street, to inspect the Muskham Street Depot and stables. Afterwards they continued to Trent Bridge for a banquet in the Town Arms Inn at the southern terminus of the line. Toasts were made and speeches given, and in this extract the chairman revealed a taste of things to come, and attempted to allay some fears of other road users:

The rails themselves [are] 27 feet in length, and these form one continuous bearing. It had been subjected to a strain of 50 tons weight, without showing any appreciable depression, and therefore, when the Government allowed them to use steam locomotives in the streets, they could freely place them upon these rails without their exhibiting any serious sinking. He was more free to speak of the advantages of the rails because they had decided to use them throughout the whole of their system. The wrought iron flange which lay at the bottom of the rail, and upon which the rails rested, had also sets laid upon it, so that the granite sets next the rail could not sink unless the rail sank with them. The objections in other towns had been that in any place where there was heavy traffic, as carriages and carts passing along, as it was technically called, "skidded" along the side of the rails. It was quite likely, therefore, that springs and wheels should be broken under such circumstances, but with the present style of rail no apprehensions need be experienced as to them.

[The Company] intended immediately to commence with Mansfield Road section . . . to Carrington Church, near which they had purchased land for stables and other premises such as they had seen that day, then along Forest Road to the end of Berners Street and then from Market Street up Derby Road to Basford. Shortly after this the party broke up, one portion returning to the centre of the town by the tramway. . . Those who returned to the town in the first car reached St. Peter's-square in the fair time of nine minutes.

Eight single deck cars had been purchased from the Starbuck Car and Wagon Company of Birkenhead, to service the routes. The depot and stables was situated on Muskham Street where the Portland swimming baths now stands.

The tramway was an immediate success, opening to the public at noon on 18 September. In the first 3 1/2 days, 12,004 passengers were carried with ticket revenue of just over £100 (equivalent to £10,100 in 2025),.

=== The Carrington route ===
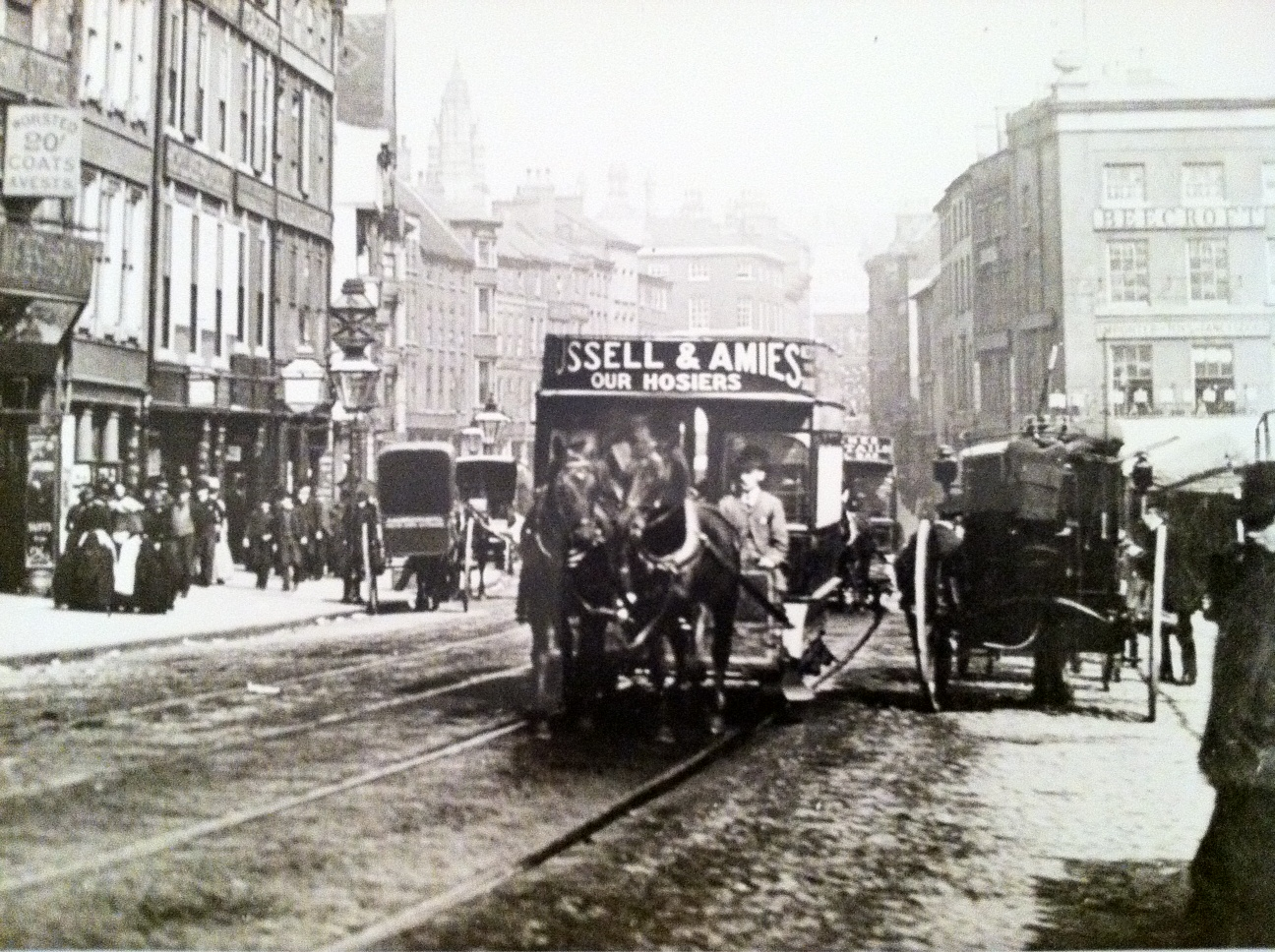
Horse tram on Long Row

The construction of the second line began almost immediately after the opening of the first. A formal ceremony took place on 23 September 1878 when Miss Bella Winby, the daughter of the patentee of the track system proceeded to raise the first stone with a miniature pick prepared specially for the occasion. The spot selected for this ceremony was in the centre of the road a small distance above St. John's Church, Carrington and exactly opposite the plot of land purchased by the company for the depot and stables. Work moved quickly and on 3 April the works were inspected by the Board of Trade and authorised for opening on Saturday 5 April 1879. The route was via Long Row, Market Street, Parliament Street, Milton Street and Mansfield Road, with a branch along Forest Road. The Carrington route was not connected to the southern route, and it had its own depot and stables between St John’s Church and Watcombe Road. This site was subsequently redeveloped into The Carrington Lido open-air swimming pool (1937–1988), then into a children's playground and, later still, redeveloped into a residential retirement development.

The inspection and opening ceremony was reported in the local press

Yesterday (Thursday) morning Major-General Hutchinson of the Board of Trade, made an official inspection of the second section of the Nottingham Tramway Company's line, which extends from the Market-place as far as Carrington and the end of Forest-Road, and which is now fully completed. . . We are authorised to state that General Hutchinson expressed himself fully satisfied with the line, and consented to its being opened for traffic on Saturday next, the requisite certificate of the Board of Trade to be forwarded in due course.

The company ran two services, firstly from the Market Place to Carrington and secondly from the Market Place to Forest Road as far as the junction with Burns Street. The track extended further along Forest Road right to the end to connect to the Basford line now under construction, but this section was not used for passenger carrying services.

The Forest Road residents were quite wealthy and this provided the company with its most profitable services. The other routes suffered slightly from having peak loadings (i.e. carrying workmen at the start and the end of the day) but less traffic during the day. The Forest Road residents provided a steady demand for services throughout the day. However, they also had complaint with the running of services on a Sunday and submitted a memorandum to the council a few months after the services started "praying that the running of trams on Sundays along Forest Road be discontinued".

For these routes Messrs Stevenson and Company of New York supplied three double deck and one single deck cars, and in 1880 Starbucks constructed five more single deck tram cars, similar to those originally supplied.

=== The Basford route ===
The third and final line to Basford was opened on 11 August 1879 and this ran from the Market Place to Basford Gas Works on Church Street, via Chapel Bar, Derby Road, Alfreton Road (with a connection to the Forest Road line), Bentick Road and Radford Road. The depot and stables for this route was built on Isandula Road, very near the Basford terminus, to designs by the Nottingham architect, Albert Nelson Bromley.

The average working week of the horse-tram crews and depot men was at first anything between 80 and 90 hours, and a 16-hour term of duty in a single day was commonplace. Conductors received 16/- per week when working and 1/- per day when not working.

Occasionally the company was required to arrange special trams. One such example occurred on 25 May 1881 when the Water Committee invited the members of the corporation to inspect "the works of the important water undertaking recently acquired by the town". From the public offices in Albert Street the large party left by private trams for Trent Bridge. As the day progressed so the party moved on to and around the various sites. From the Trent works they travelled by tram again and then walked to the Castle Works. From there the Park Row reservoir was visited and another short walk took them to the Sion Hill [Canning Circus] Works. From the top of the Derby Road, nearby, the tram cars were used for the journey to the Scotholme Springs. The party then moved on by carriage to see Bestwood Pumping Station.

Starbucks provided five single deck cars for the Basford service. By December 1879 the company had twenty cars running on the three sections, employing 192 horses, and the average number of passengers was from 50,000 to 60,000 each week.

With the steep gradient of 1 in 17 up Chapel Bar and Derby Road, two additional horses were required to haul the cars. These trace-horses, or cock-horses as they were called, were put on at the bottom of Market Street, and taken off at Canning Circus.

A report of the Market and Fairs committee was presented to the Corporation on 1 March 1880 as follows:

We have agreed to allow two horses which are required to work the tram cars on the heavy gradients of Market Street and Derby Road, to stand in the Market Place under a suitable covering provided by the Tramways Company, on payment of such weekly amount as would by payable for stalls occupying the same space.

The cock horse enclosure came into service on 11 March 1880. The company erected a temporary shed. This led to a dispute with the council and on 7 March 1881 the Annual Report of the Markets and Fairs Committee was presented to the Corporation and states that the shed for horses of the Tramway Company in the Market Place has . . . been removed at the request of the Council.

Later photographs suggest that it consisted of four posts, with a single rope on three sides, the fourth side being open towards the tram lines, but in the winter it is likely that the space was covered by a tarpaulin to offer the horses some brief shelter between duties. It is said that the horses became so used to their task of assisting the trams up Market Street, that when released at the top of the hills they often came back on their own, leaving the horse boys behind.

The tram fare up Derby Road was 2d, but coming down it was 1d. The journey from the Market place to Basford took one hour ten minutes and to extend the service to Bulwell, the company provided its own horse-drawn omnibuses to transport passengers from the Basford tram terminus.

It has been suggested that a cock horse was also required to assist on the inward journey from Hyson Green up Alfreton Road to Raleigh Street, although no records have been found to indicate where the horses were kept.

Designation of routes was by a lettered destination board on each side of the car above the windows, and the cars were painted various colours denoting the routes on which they worked. The Trent Bridge and Station Street services were all over yellow, the Carrington and Forest Road services were white and red and the Basford service was white and dark blue.

Although a service to Bulwell via Alfreton Road and Cinderhill was considered, no further extension to the route was made, nor were any new routes commissioned, but additional vehicles were purchased to add to the fleet or to replace existing vehicles which were scrapped.

A local correspondent, Percy Vere, wrote an article in 1879 to the Nottingham Journal during the construction of the tramways entitled On Local Locomotion, an extract from which is included here, as it gives some statistics and comparisons:

It was said that Nottingham could not support a tramway company; that there was this, that, and the other special reason why it would be all moonshine in Nottingham. It was said again that the uneven roads would necessitate the employment of too many extra horses to make the company pay; but these prognosticators did not know that uneven roads create traffic; that people are ever ready to jump into a car, and even pay a full fare to simply ride to the top of a hill. Now it happens that these prophets are without honour in their native land. The tramways company is a great success in the town, as we shall see very soon. The first section was opened on September the 18th last year, the running being to and from the Railway Stations, the Trent Bridge, and St. Peter's Church. On that first day 2,277 persons were carried in four inside cars, which were worked by 27 horse, the fare being twopence all the way. But here is something rather good. In the week ending October the 5th (Goose Fair week mind) no fewer than 32,619 persons were carried in five cars; and this result was said by experienced men to be unparalleled in the history of tramways.

On the 5 April 1879, the second dual section, namely, the route from Smithy-row . . . to Carrington Church, and along the top of Forest-road to the top of Burns-street was opened. Contrary to . . . expectation. . . the Forest-road route. . .has proved to be the most successful branch in the service, as the returns show the receipts to be over 30s. per day per car more than those of any of the other branches. This result will be read with some astonishment, yet when the matter is looked into it will be seen that the Forest-road traffic being wealthier it is more regular. There may be fewer "packed" cars on the Forest, but from morning to night the seats are pretty well occupied, which cannot be said of the Station and Trent Bridge routes. These two sections are in operation at present, and to work them twelve cars (including three outside ones to and from the Trent Bridge) are in use. In Whitweek - in spite of the fitful weather, there was no lack of riders in trams, in fact one car only carried in one day no fewer than 1,837 persons, with a revenue of £15 6s. 2d. There are now 120 very fine horses employed; but the company is at the present time trying the experiment of seeing what can be done with those, said to be, stupid "gentlemen" called mules. These creatures are now in use daily on the South London Tramways, and being fleet in movement and less expensive in maintenance, they are proving to be advantageous on level roads. A couple of these animals have been brought from Kentucky for the Nottingham Tramways Company, and they are now running on the Trent Bridge line with much success. The manager, Mr. G. Herbert, has "put them on their metal" by testing their conduct in a variety of ways, and he finds them to be remarkably tractable, and very useful indeed for level roads for simply running in one groove.

In the course of about six weeks the third and last section of the company's present scheme will be completed and opened for traffic, namely, the course from the Exchange Hall . . to Old Basford Gas Works. . . taking the present as a guide to the future, the passenger traffic will be at the least 3,000 people per week per car, or 60,000 as the grand total. Of course, the company have not been unmindful of the great importance of adopting every precaution for the full return of the money taken by the conductors, and the employment of the "bell punch", recording every issue of tickets, has been found to be as good a plan as any that is known.

The question is often asked, how the cab and omnibus proprietors take to these innovations. Of course not very kindly, but experience shows that these individuals are more frightened than hurt. At first there is a little loss of revenue to the cabmen, but in the end the result is no worse, as people get educated to riding everywhere, and cabs get a fair share. The railways were said to have struck a death-blow at the ordinary vehicle traffic, but such did not prove to be true, and, wherever tramways have opened there has been no decrease in the numbers of cabs - Leicester for instance. Since the company have been running per timetable, the bus proprietors have done the same thing along St. Ann's Well-road, and with good result. For the comfort of the shareholders of the company, it may be stated that the directors will no doubt pay in July (with the interim dividend paid in February), a dividend at the rate of six per cent per annum. When this is taken into full consideration - that is to say, when all the difficulties are duly allowed for, and it is remembered that only a portion of the line is as yet opened - the result is most satisfactory. Indeed all the shares are now quoted at two per cent premium with few vendors. As to the character of the company, I think it is not undue flattery to say that it is efficiently and economically managed as the staff is limited to the mere necessary officials, and the directorate is small. Considering the rail employed is one that is sure to result in great saving to the shareholders, seeing that there will be little or no cost of repairs, and taking into consideration also the fact that the tramway route is populous, and the working expenses small, there is every reason to prophecy success to the company . . . As far as we can make out the estimated weekly receipts of the Tramway Company amount to about £350, and in Whit week we believe as much as £430 was taken, for which upwards of 50,000 people were carried. Taking £350 as the average weekly receipts gives a total of over £17,000 in a year, which is a very large sum indeed for the present branch of tramway service in a town of such proportions as Nottingham . . . There are 212 cabs in the town, so that estimating the earnings at but £2 per week there is a total of £424 weekly, or £20,000 a year. Taking the above as a very moderate estimate, and making a little allowance for omnibuses, 'carriers' carts, &c., it is fair to suppose that at least £40,000 a year is spent in Nottingham for passenger traffic.

=== Accidents and incidents ===
If the nineteenth century horse trams were recreated today on the streets of twenty-first century Nottingham, they would seem impossibly slow but an almost risk free form of transport. However, the company was involved in some accidents, some fatal, as this report from the Nottingham Journal on 1 September 1879 shows:

On Saturday (30 August) a sad accident happened in Station Street. It seems that a porter or carriage driver named Walter Shepherd employed at the Midland Railway Station was trying to cross the road in the above named street when in endeavouring to get out of the way of a horse which was coming along and a tramcar was passing at the same time [sic]. He was knocked down and so dreadfully crushed by the wheels that he died sometime after at the General Hospital. The deceased was about 36 years of age, married and leaves a family.

At the inquest the coroner recorded a verdict of accidental death.

On 7 May 1880 a case was heard before the Nottingham Magistrates' Court where James Crabbe a tram driver was charged with offences from 4 May of using abusive language to the police and with running his tramcar into the Yeomanry. The officer reported that his was on duty at the junction of Clumber Street and Parliament Street when the defendant came along driving his tram, and persisted in pushing his way into the Cavalry. The officer tried to stop him but he refused and the pole of the tram car ran into the horses, though it did no injury. The officer reported that the defendant used bad language and told the officer to go somewhere. James Crabbe was found guilty and the bench imposed a fine of 40s.

On 4 July 1880 five conductors were charged with allowing overcrowding of their tramcars and after an appearance by Herbert Gideon, the manager and secretary of the company promising that this would not happen again, they were fined 10s each.

The Basford route was the scene of a fatal accident on 3 August 1880. Two young girls were crossing Alfreton Road. A bleach van approached and they tried to avoid it, one of them ran in front of a passing tram car and was knocked down by the horses. A wheel passed over her neck and she was killed on the spot. At an inquest the coroner exonerated the company and recorded a verdict of accidental death.

On 30 August 1880 a Midland Railway dray horse ran away down Low Pavement and collided with a tramcar. The dray horse charged between the tramcar and the tramcar horses and the tramcar was thrown off the line. The driver and single passenger who were standing on the front of the tram had a lucky escape.

A recurring problem was the inability of the tramcars to avoid obstructions. On 28 July 1883 a hansom cab driver, Mark Thompson, was summoned to court for obstructing the progress of a tramcar. He was sitting in his hansom on Albert Street waiting for a fare when the tramcar approached. He refused to move over to allow the tramcar to pass and a large crowd gathered which completely blocked the street. He was fined 10s.

Josiah Dann, a tramcar conductor, was summoned on 2 August 1883 for having carried 28 passengers when the car was only licensed for 24. The officer noticed the tramcar in Carrington Street drawn by one horse and counted the passengers. When the car reached the ascent at the Canal Bridge, the horse had to stop and some of the passengers got out. The conductor pleaded guilty but in mitigation said that the passengers were all going to the Nottinghamshire v. Gloucestershire cricket match at Trent Bridge. He was fined 20s.

Sometimes the intense competition between omnibus and tramcar company got out of hand as this report from the Nottingham Journal of 9 August 1883 reveals:

William Kirk, driver of the steam tram car on the Derby-road, was summoned for using abusive and threatening language to Israel Jordan, driver of the Nottingham and Bulwell omnibus. Mr. W.H. Stevenson appeared for the complainant and Mr. Barlow for the defendant. Mr. Stevenson said this was another instance in which the Tramway Company endeavoured to monopolise all the streets in the town. There was a case before the Bench the other week in which the company summoned one of this complainant's drivers for being on the wrong side of the road. The Bench dismissed the case. The next day Mr. Jordan was driving along Derby-road when the defendant used abusive language to him, and said "You beat us yesterday, but I'll be even with you before the week is out. The first time I meet you I'll knock you and the bus off the road." Defendant also threatened to give complainant a "good hiding". Israel Jordan was then called, and said he was one of the proprietors of the Nottingham and Bulwell Bus. He corroborated the statement of Mr. Stevenson. In reply to Mr. Barlow, he denied that he first used threatening language towards complainant. Frederick Bramley, residing at Hucknall Torkard also corroborated.-- There was a cross summons taken out by Kirk against Jordan for abusive language, and obstructing the steam car. The charge of using abusive language was withdrawn, but the other was proceeded with and Kirk was placed in the witness box. After hearing his evidence, however, the Bench dismissed the summons against Jordan, and fined Kirk 10s. The also expressed a hope that a better feeling would be established between tramcar drivers and conductors and the drivers of other vehicles.

=== The Steam Tram ===
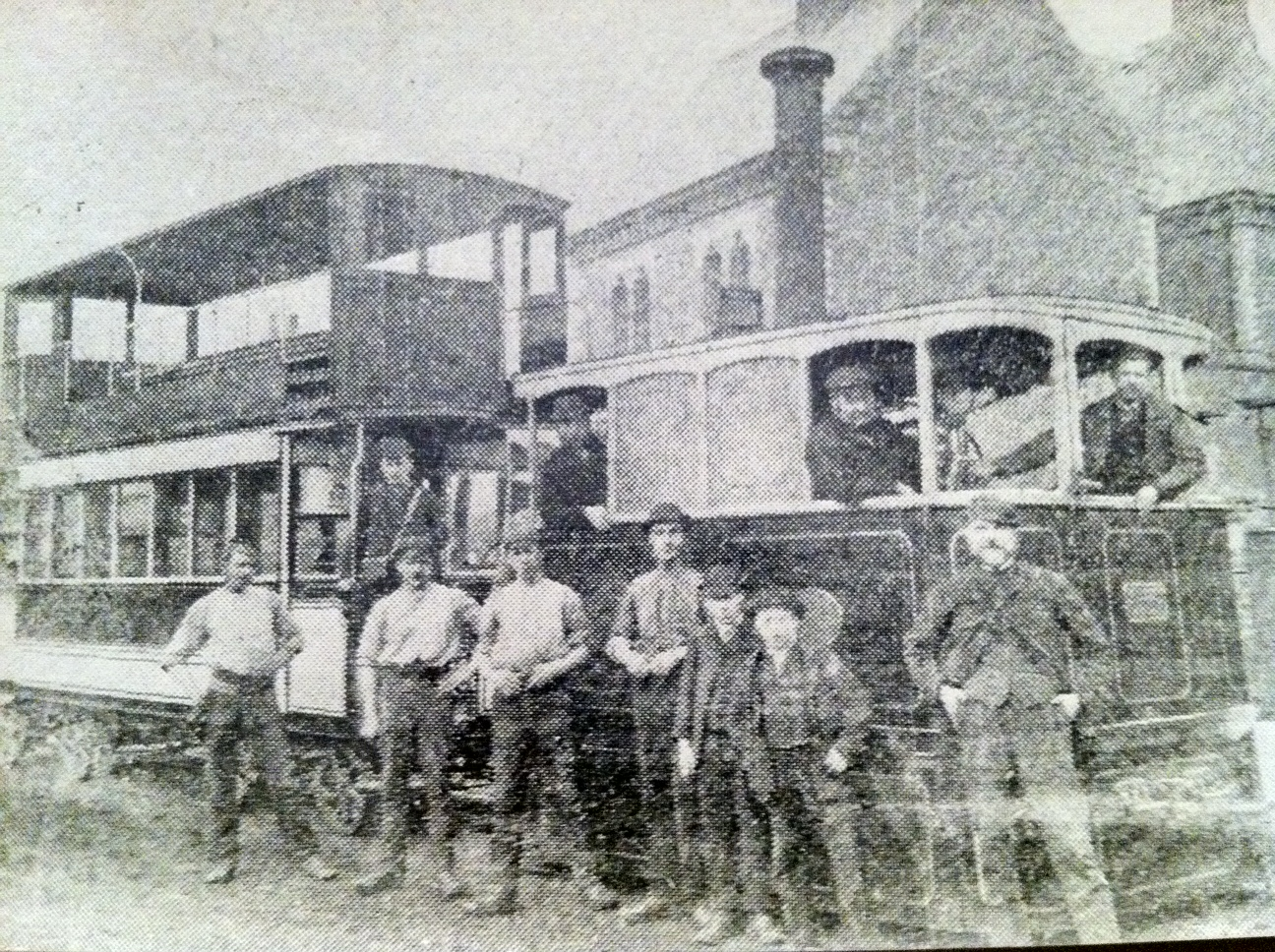
Nottingham Steam Tram circa 1882

In 1880 the company made some trials with a steam tram from Messrs Hughes and Co. of Loughborough. On 27 May, at six in the morning, the engine was brought to the top of Sion Hill outside the general cemetery where a number of invited guests boarded. The tram proceeded down the steep hill on Derby Road and Chapel Bar to the terminus next to the Exchange. Then the car left the Market Place and made the reverse journey back up the Derby Road hill, stopping to prove that it could start on a steep hill. The tram then proceeded to the Basford Depot and when the flat ground of Radford Road was reached the driver was instructed to increase the speed, and 20 m.p.h. was achieved. The tram reached the Basford Depot in approximately 20 minutes and the trial was judged a success. A further experiment was undertaken on 3 June, to which civic dignitaries including the mayor, the town clerk and various aldermen were invited, some of whom followed the trial from horse-drawn tram cars. The emission of steam in the Market Place was explained by the manufacturer, Mr. Hughes as he had been requested by the authorities to discharge the condensing water outside of the town, so under normal operating conditions, steam would be prevented from escaping in the town.

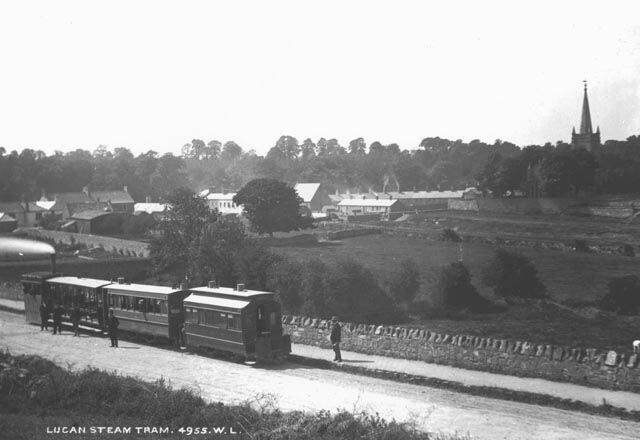
A steam tram on the Dublin and Lucan Steam Tramway

In 1880 Manlove, Alliott & Co. Ltd. built a steam tram at their Bloomsgrove Works in Norton St that was tested on the Nottingham tracks. It was sold to the Dublin and Lucan Steam Tramway Company, for £950 (equivalent to £99,900 in 2025),, in 1881. It is reported to have covered its two-mile (3 km) run in ten minutes.

This Manlove Alliott design was a self-propelled steam vehicle having a vertical boiler on each end platform with the engine mounted below the saloon floor. The upper deck had knife-board seats, back to back, with a top canopy and open sides and ends, with modesty rails. The boiler chimneys ran up and through the roof, at each end, serving coke boilers 25½ inches in diameter and 6 feet (1.8 m) high. The two-cylinder steam engine had a piston bore of 7½ inches and a stroke of 9 inches. Unladen it weighed 9 tons and was capable of carrying 50 passengers.

The General Works and Highways Committee granted approval on 2 January 1881 for a one-week trial using steam power on the Mansfield Road route.

On 9 January 1882 the General Works and Highways Committee reported to the corporation an application of the tramways company "for permission to use steam power for a period of one year on Basford, Carrington and Forest routes using Parrott's patent combined engine and car, manufactured by Manlove, Alliott and Fryer of Nottingham, and Dickenson's combined engine and car, manufactured in Sheffield." This was agreed on quite remarkable conditions, including "that no steam or smoke be discharged and that the action of the engine shall be noiseless". However, the introduction of steam power required Board of Trade approval and the order appears to have not been carried out. The company may have run trials with these two engines but there is no evidence that either was put into passenger carrying service.

Eleven months later on 4 December 1882 the General Works and Highways Committee reported that "the Tramways Company were authorised by the Board of Trade to use a steam tram on the Basford route for one year. The following conditions applied:

The Board of Trade under the powers conferred upon them by the Tramways Orders Confirmation Act 1879, do by this license authorise as an experiment only, the use of steam power in addition to, or in substitution of, animal power by the Nottingham and Districts Tramways Company, Limited, (hereinafter called "the Company") on Tramways No. 2 authorised by the Nottingham and Districts Tramways Order 1877, which was confirmed by the Tramways Order Confirmation Act 1879 (hereinafter called "the tramways") extending from the Market-place in Nottingham to the terminus is Basford, for a period not exceeding one year from the date hereof, subject to the following requirements, regulations and conditions, that is to say :-

REQUIREMENTS

The engine to be used on the tramways shall be an engine built by W. Wilkinson and Company of Wigan, Lancashire, and designated by a plate affixed thereto as No. 1, if so long as it complies with the following requirements, that is to say:-

(a) The engine shall be fitted with an efficient brake, and a governor shall be attached to the engine, so arranged that at any time when the engine exceeds a speed of eight miles an hour it shall cause the steam to be shut off and the brakes applied.

(b) The number shall be shown in a conspicuous part thereof.

(c) It shall be fitted with an indicator by means of which the speed shall be shown, with a suitable fender to push aside obstructions, and with a special bell to be sounded as a warning when necessary.

(d) Arrangement shall be made enabling the driver to command the fullest possible view of the road before him.

(e) It shall be free from noise produced by blast or clatter of machinery: the machinery shall be concealed from view at all points above four inches from the level of the rails, and all fire used on the engine shall be concealed from view.

Every carriage used on the tramways shall be so constructed as to provide for the safety of passengers, and for their safe entrance to, exit from, and accommodation in, such carriage, and for their protection from the machinery of the engine used for drawing or propelling such carriage.

REGULATIONS

1. The speed at which the engine and carriages shall be driven or propelled along the tramways shall not exceed the rate of six miles an hour, and the speed at which such engine shall pass through facing points, whether fixed or movable, shall not exceed the rate of four miles an hour.

2. The special bell shall be sounded by the driver of the engine from time to time when it is necessary as a warning.

3. No steam or smoke shall be emitted from the engine, and no hot air shall issue in a way to annoy passengers.

4. Whenever it is necessary to prevent impending danger the engine shall be brought to a stand-still.

5. The entrance to and exit from the carriages shall be by the endermost or conductor's platform.

6. Before commencing to descend the incline in Derby-road and the curve in Bentinck-road, the engine shall on each occasion be brought to a stand-still and the speed in descending the same shall not exceed four miles an hour.

7. The Company shall place, and keep placed, in a conspicuous position inside of each carriage in use on the tramways, a printed copy of these requirements, regulations and conditions.

8. For any breach of any of the above requirements or regulations the Company shall for each offence be liable to a penalty not exceeding ten pounds.

CONDITIONS

The Board of Trade and their officers may from time to time, and shall on the application of the local authority of any of the districts through which the tramways pass, inspect the engine or carriages used on the tramways, and the machinery therein; and may whenever they think fit prohibit the use on the tramways of any of them which in their opinion are not safe for use.

Signed by order of the Board of Trade, this twenty-fifth day of November, 1882. Henry G. Calcraft (Asst. Secretary)

In addition to these conditions the letter from the Board of Trade to the town council added that the licence was issued on the distinct understanding that the engine shall not be used on the short length at the Basford end of the line, until the tramway has been placed in the centre of the road and means provided for the engine getting round its car.

This trial appears to have been successful because company sought an extension to the one year licence, and this was confirmed in the Nottingham Tramways Order 1884 of 2 April 1884 – the "Order authorising the use of Steam Power on the Tramways of the Nottingham and District Tramways Company Ltd." This order included a schedule of operating restrictions almost identical to that in the order of 1882, but strangely no mention is made of a speed restriction when descending Derby Road.

The steam tram engine operated from the Isandula Road depot into Nottingham and it towed a tramcar - originally horse-drawn - adapted for use behind the tram engine. William Wilkinson was an ambitions engineer who ran a foundry at Wigan. His earliest known experiments with steam trams were in 1881 when he arranged with the Wigan Tramways Company to try out a steam locomotive he had designed for tramways.

A Wilkinson engine weighed about eleven tons, carried 160 gallons of water and had a bunker capable of carrying nine cubic feet of coke. It was a vertical engine with a vertical boiler. The cylinders were of small bore and acted upon a crankshaft through which motion was communicated to the four coupled wheels by cog-wheel gears. Exhaust steam was not condensed but was superheated in a patent contrivance in the firebox whence it escaped to the atmosphere through the chimney.

Over 200 Wilkinson engines were built between 1881 and 1886, however, the early popularity of this design outstripped the production capacity of the Wilkinson firm, and other companies manufactured them to the Wilkinson patent. Despite their general reliability, they were not as successful as other manufacturers and production practically ceased in 1886. A Wilkinson engine cost between £600 and £1,100, and an estimate of the running costs (wages, fuel, water, stores, housing, repairs, maintenance and depreciation over 20 years) is around 6d per mile.

In 1885 a double deck, top covered, bogie tram had been purchased from Starbucks specifically for operation behind the steam tram.

The tramcar had two small oil lamps fitted into the bulkheads and inside it was so dark at night that the conductor had to use a portable lamp clipped to his belt. The tram’s upper deck had back to back ‘knifeboard' seating running the length of the vehicle and whilst the passengers were protected from smoke and soot by the roof, the sides were open from the modesty rails upwards. The tramcar had a coloured signal light outside and a cord running the length of the saloon, connected with a gong on the engine, for signalling purposes.

Steam trams relied upon their weight and adhesion for propulsion and as the town streets were badly paved, dirt, stones, manure and water got into the rail grooves. Water boys and track cleaners were employed to clean out the rail grooves with long iron bars, which they dragged along the rails, it being essential to ensure the wheel flanges ran fully in the grooves, to allow the wheel tread to grip the track. The specification of performance was strict, the vehicle had to be silent, had to emit no smoke and was required to have no exposed parts which could provide a safety hazard to pedestrians and horses. In Nottingham, only one steam tram was operated and being considerably heavier than a horse-drawn car, it, no doubt, caused considerable damage to the track.

The steam tram achieved only limited success and cut just 10 minutes from the 1-hour 10-minute horse-drawn journey from Basford to Nottingham. The report of 1885 in The Railway & Tramway Express reported that the steam tram gave unsatisfactory performance and had more holidays allotted to it than the horses. With running costs of around 6d per mile, each return trip from Basford to Nottingham would have cost the company around 2s 9d. In 1889, it lost its licence and was withdrawn, the 1885 passenger tram car being rebuilt into a horse-drawn, four-wheeled vehicle, being shortened and having its top cover removed. This car spent the rest of its days on the Trent Bridge service.

=== Other vehicles ===
In 1883 Starbucks supplied a further two single deck cars, similar to the original batch, followed in 1884 by two more. These were known as summer cars, they were painted all over green, and were of the toast rack design, being extremely low, with the foot-boards only just off the ground. The seats were built immediately above the wheels, which were mounted or stub axles. Two further standard single deck cars were bought from Starbucks in 1885 and in the same year Car No.19 (being a Starbuck of 1881) was converted into a double decker.

In 1887 the company purchased a car from the Manchester Carriage and Tramways Company, this being a double-decker with a single ended body pivoted on the truck. This device removed the need to detach the horses at the terminus, as the horses would turn the car round and be ready to start off in the opposite direction again. This design was not particularly successful and the vehicle was later rebuilt as a standard rigid car with two ends.

The Carrington service had, as its competitor, a omnibus service operated by Messrs Andrews of Carrington. When this firm went bankrupt, in 1888, the tramway company bought four of their omnibuses and converted them to tram cars. In 1891 two of the converted buses were scrapped, as was car No.19, which was an 1881 Starbuck single deck design, converted to double deck in 1885. The other two converted omnibuses were renumbered, and four further new cars were obtained. From G. F. Milnes & Co., two double-deckers were purchased, and two of toast rack design came from an unknown maker. It is possible that those two toast rack vehicles were built at Nottingham in the company’s own works.

Illumination inside the trams at night was very poor, and to quote a contemporary writer, "gloom prevailed," the only light being a small oil lamp at each end in the recess where the conductor kept his tickets. The tickets were pre-printed, each service having its own series, the stage points being printed lengthways along either side.

In 1892, the two remaining converted omnibuses were scrapped, one of the toast rack cars was renumbered and a further two double-deckers were obtained from G. F. Milnes being similar in design to those purchased the previous year. In 1895 the horse tram fleet was completed by the purchase of three further double-deckers, this time from the Brush Company’s Falcon Works at Loughborough.

Section 43 of the Tramways Act 1870 (33 & 34 Vict. c. 78) provided that where the promoters of a tramway were not the local authority, the local authority may, within six months of the expiration of 21 years from the date the promoters were empowered to construct the tramway, acquire the undertaking, at the current value, with and including all lands, buildings, works, materials, horses and rolling stock as required for the operation of the system.

== Nottingham Corporation Tramways, 1897 onwards ==
=== Withdrawal of horse tram services ===
The relationship between company and corporation appears to have been an uneasy one. There were complaints from local residents about the running of trams on Sundays. There was a proposal from the company to the council asking to share the cost of narrowing causeways (pavements) on Arkwright Street. This was due to the fact that Arkwright Street was not sufficiently wide such that vehicles could park on the roadway without obstructing the tramlines. Clearly the council were unhappy, as not only did they not agree to share the cost, they insisted that the company leave the pavements as they were. There was also a disagreement with the company over the maintenance of the roads in which the tramways ran. The work was supposed to be done by the corporation, with the bills being paid by the company, but the company found it was cheaper to hire in labour directly. The corporation threatened proceedings and insisted on the withdrawal of the company's labour.

In November 1878 the company announced proposals for extensions. These included lines from the Market Place to St. Ann's Well Road and Bridge Street Radford, a connection between the northern and southern sections along Wheeler Gate, and a line from the end of Station Street across Plumtree Square to connect with the St. Ann's Well Road route at Alfred Street South. If built this would have added 3 miles 6 furlongs 1.25 chains to the network giving a total length of 9 miles 3 furlongs 7.25 chains. These were discussed by the Corporation at a council meeting on 6 January 1879 and cautiously the General Works and Highways Committee were instructed to watch the position. Four weeks later, on 3 February, the committee recommended opposition to the proposed extension of the tramways for present and this was agreed.

Perhaps these proposals were put forward again to the council for on 5 December 1881, on the recommendation of General Works and Highways Committee, the council decided that the plans for extension of tramways would be deferred until the site of the new central railway station (later Victoria Station) was settled.

The company did not give up, or perhaps they did not get the message from the council. A fresh proposal of extensions was drawn up and put to the council on 13 November 1882. These included lines from Market Place to St. Ann's Well Road, Bridge Street Radford, Woodborough Road, Carlton Road, and across Trent Bridge - a length of 8 miles 6 furlongs, which would have taken the total network to 14 miles 8 furlongs 6 chains. On 4 December the Council was asked to support this application by unnamed promoters to the Board of Trade for a provisional order to extend tramways but they refused. The tramways were the subject of debate at the next meeting on 8 January 1883 and it was resolved that the corporation should purchase on equitable terms the tramway lines of the Nottingham and District Tramways Company Limited and should make all further extensions themselves, and lease the lines to a company. The motivation for this was probably less to do with the series of disagreements between company and corporation that had been experienced since the lines opened, and more to do with the profitability of the company.

However, the company had a 21-year licence for operating the tramway and nothing was done until 1890 when the corporation was petitioned by the directors of the Nottinghamshire and Midland Merchants and Traders' Association.

the tram service in Nottingham is not equal to the requirements of the town. That from the hilly nature of the town, travelling by means of horses is exceedingly slow and expensive, and a quicker and cheaper mode of transit ought to be adopted. That various parts of the town which ought to be supplied have no tram facilities. That the want of communication between the lines in Market Place and St. Peter's Square is a great inconvenience [etc]"

The corporation agreed and sought some compromise arrangement between the company and corporation but action was slow. Five years later on 9 December 1895 it was resolved:

That the Parliamentary Committee be instructed to ascertain

(1) The terms upon which the Nottingham Tramways Company now carry on their undertaking in the highways and streets of the town, and when their powers will terminate;

(2) What powers the Corporation possess with regard to the Nottingham Tramways;

(3) What steps it is desirable that the Corporation should take in relation to the Tramways;

(4) If it is found desirable that the Corporation should move in the matter, to advise what course should be adopted.

It took the parliamentary committee nine months to propose on 7 September 1896

that the Local Authority may apply to purchase 21 years after the inception of the tramway, which will fall in 1898. That considerable extensions of the service are desirable e.g. to Sherwood, Mapperley Plains, Wells Rd, Sneinton, Bulwell, Lenton and Radford; and that Parliamentary powers are necessary before the Corporation can engage in their work. Order given for Town Clerk to proceed with a Bill and preparations to be made for an application to acquire the tramways in 1898. Meanwhile, enquiries to be made on the running of tramways by Councils in other towns.

When the Nottingham Corporation took over the undertaking, but the directors of the Nottingham and District Tramways Company Limited continued, in office, as trustees on behalf of the Nottingham Corporation until such time as the corporation was empowered to act independently. On 14 June 1897 the corporation purchased the tramway for £80,000 (equivalent to £8,990,000 in 2025), and on 10 September 1897 the final meeting of the shareholders was held. On 18 October 1897 the system was handed over to the corporation.

The corporation was empowered under sections 41 and 42 of the Nottingham Improvement Act 1897 (60 & 61 Vict. c. ccxxxviii) to operate the existing tramways, with the exception of that along Forest Road, by animal or mechanical power. Seven new routes were also approved.

The existing system continued to be operated by the corporation, under the direction of the manager, Mr A. Baker. All vehicles were re-painted in maroon and cream with 'Nottingham Corporation Tramways' replacing the company name. In 1898 the Tramways Committee authorised the purchase of uniforms for the men operating on the tramcars, and made some improvements to the tramcars, including modifying the seats on the upper decks of double-deck cars to make them into "Automatic Rainproof" seats and installing clocks in each car on the Basford route. They also increased the service on the Basford route after mid-day, so there was a car leaving the Market Place every five minutes rather than every ten. The fare on the return journey between Newdigate Street and the Market place was reduced to 1d. The wages for the staff were also increased in 1898, drivers with three years experience were on 28s per week, and conductors 22s 9d. Over the next two years there was a dramatic rise in patronage and hence weekly revenue from the system with the average increasing from around £600 to £900 (equivalent to £95,600 in 2025),.

The Tramways Committee also formalised the stopping places for the tramcars, and negotiated with the corporation Lighting Committee to have the lampposts at tramstops painted in a distinctive colour with a different coloured glass in the lantern. Whether this was actually carried out is not recorded. The tramstops on Arkwright Street were determined to be Crocus Street, Cromford Street, Kirkwhite Street, Atlas Street, Glebe Street, Ryehill Street and Lamcote Street. Crocus Street and Lamcote Street were request stops only.

The Tramways Committee met nearly every two weeks and the minutes record a constant stream of accidents and claims on the committee for damages too numerous to list here. There are complaints by shopkeepers against tramcar drivers who let their horses and cars stand outside the shop. There are records of payments to tramcar drivers who acted bravely in restraining horses which were startled and bolted. Despite the imminent introduction of electric cars, the horse tram rails still required maintenance, and the minute book records that the track outside the Mechanics Institute was replaced at the end of 1897.

On 28 March 1898, the corporation agreed to the proposal of the Tramways Committee on re-constructing the existing tramways, and extensions required; and as to the method of traction to be adopted "that the whole of the permanent way should be reconstructed with much heavier rails; that the whole system should be equipped with electric traction". On 16 May the Tramways Committee proposed the following alterations in routes, which are approved:

- Basford single line to be doubled and extended to Bulwell
- Carrington Line to be doubled and extended to Winchester St Sherwood.

New lines to be made along :

(1) Sherwood Rise
(2) Lower Parliament St, King Edward St, St. Anns Well Rd and Wells Rd
(3) Grey Friars Gate and Lenton Boulevard to Hartley Rd returning via Canal St
(4) Wilford Rd to Wilford Bridge
(5) W (oodborough Rd and Mapperley Plains to Porchester Rd
(6) Wheeler Gate to the Market Place, which will become a tram centre.

The 1900 annual report of the Tramways Committee states

The undertaking is in a transition state, owing to the decision of the Council to substitute electric motive power for the present horse traction". The Manager (J. Aldworth) reported "The increase of wages granted to conductors come into operation early in June last year and these now range from 20/- to 25/-, against 17/6 to 22/9 per week . . . I have pleasure in saying I consider the greater attention to detail given to the work shown by a great decrease in the number of complaints received from the public and the substantial increase in receipts has fully justified the action. No of passengers 8,441,193. Miles run, 790,074.

An outbreak of "pink eye" in the stud of horses in 1900 resulted in a severe curtailment of the horse-drawn service.

Kelly's Directory of Nottinghamshire for 1900 gives an idea of the extent of the operation of the system at the end of its life:

Station Route from St. Peter's church to Great Northern railway; leave St. Peter's church at 7.45am and every 5 minutes till 9.55pm; leave Great Northern railway 7.55am and every 5 minutes till 10.05pm

Trent Bridge route from St. Peter's church to Trent Bridge; leave St. Peter's church at 8.05am and every 5 minutes till 11pm; leave Trent Bridge at 7.30am and every 5 minutes till 10.40pm

Basford route, from Market Place to Old Basford; leave Market Place 8am and every 10 minutes till 10.50pm; leave Old Basford 7.25am and every 10 minutes till 9.55pm; every 5 minutes to Grand Theatre from 12.05pm to 10.45pm

Carrington Route, from Parliament Street to Carrington; leave Parliament Street at 8am and every 7½ minutes till 10.45pm; leave Carrington 7.37am and every 7½ minutes till 10.22pm.

Forest route, from Market Place to Forest Road; leave Market Place 8.20am and every 20 minutes till 10.20pm; leave Forest Road (Burns Street) 8.10am and every 20 minutes till 10.10pm.

Omnibuses to New Basford - Tramway Co from Smithy Row every 20 minutes

Omnibuses to Bridgford - Edward Mann and Nottingham and District Tramways Company from St. Peters square every ½ hour

Omnibuses to Trent Bridge - Edward Mann and Nottingham and District Tramways Company from St. Peter's square every 15 minutes

Omnibuses supplemented the services whilst track relaying was carried out for the new electric trams. On 17 April 1901 a horse tram service operated from Gregory Boulevard to Bulwell Market over the new rails. As the section of track between Gregory Boulevard and the Market place was re-laid, gradually the horse tram service was extended such that on 29 June trams were operating the complete journey from Nottingham to Bulwell. This lasted less than a month and electric vehicles replaced horse power on 23 July 1901.

The other horse tram services were phased out, as electrified routes were completed. On 1 January 1901 the Sherwood route commenced electric services, and on 21 October 1901 electric services were introduced on the Trent Bridge and Station Street services.

By the end of 1901, the Tramways Committee reported that the service on the Forest Route was experiencing substantial losses, and it was reduced to a "quarter hour" service. The residents of Forest Road had been petitioning the corporation for months to get the Forest Road route converted to electric traction. The matter was debated, but the route was closed on 30 April 1902 and the history of horse-drawn tramcars in Nottingham came to an end.

== See also ==
- Nottingham Express Transit (light-rail tramway commencing service in 2004)
