= HM Prison Nottingham =

Men's prison and young offender institution in Nottingham

Coordinates: 52°59′05″N 1°09′17″W

HMP and YOI Nottingham
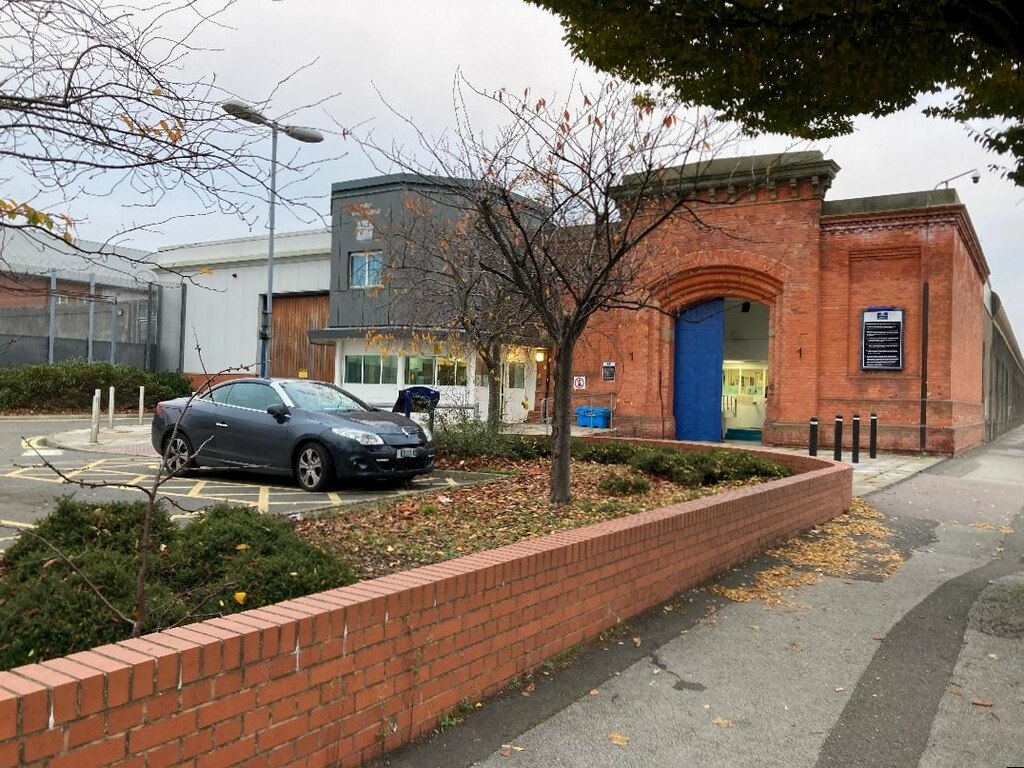
- Prison reception entrance
- Interactive map of HMP and YOI Nottingham
- Location: Nottingham, Nottinghamshire
- Security class: Adult Male/Category B
- Capacity: 1060
- Population: 964 (5 January 2018)
- Opened: 1890
- Managed by: HM Prison Service
- Governor: Paul Yates OBE
- Website: Nottingham Prison at justice.gov.uk

HM Prison Nottingham is a Category B men's prison, located in the Sherwood area of Nottingham, Nottinghamshire, England. The prison is operated by His Majesty's Prison Service.

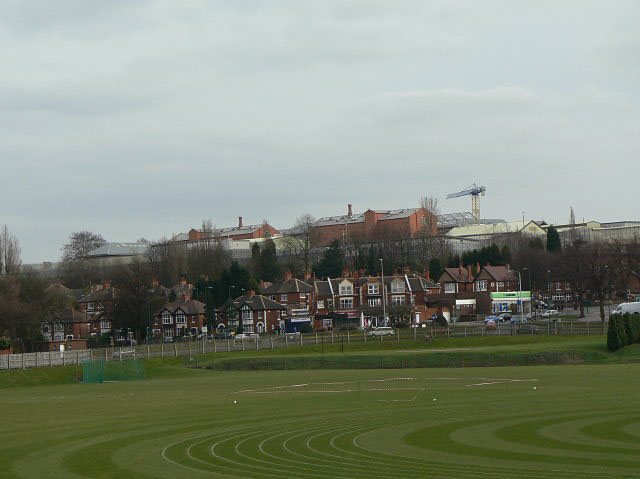
The prison seen from Tring Vale in 2009

== History ==
The history of the prison stretches back to 1890, when it opened as a city gaol. Rebuilt in 1912, it became a closed training establishment for adult males, a role it continued until 1997. Since then, it has received prisoners from the courts of Nottinghamshire and Derbyshire as a category B local prison.

In 1999, the Home Office announced that Nottingham Prison was to serve as a pilot project of a potentially national plan to track paedophiles and other high risk offenders after their release from their sentence by providing them housing in flats on prison sites. A dozen local residents staged protests in opposition.

In October 2004, a voluntary drug testing scheme established at Nottingham Prison was "hailed as a success". Participants in the scheme underwent intensive drug therapy, with prisoners who remained drug-free offered the opportunity of early release from their sentences.

In July 2004, the Independent Monitoring Board published a report which called for the worn-out Victorian wing of Nottingham Prison to be closed and urgently refurbished, as it "was becoming totally unsuitable for accommodating anybody – especially in winter when ... [temperatures in the building could] be as cold as 10 °C". Soon after this, the prison wing was closed down. In June 2008, it was announced that Nottingham would undergo major re-construction that would double the size of the prison. The £95 million facelift saw the condemned Victorian wing demolished and new accommodation and facilities built in its place.

== Facility ==
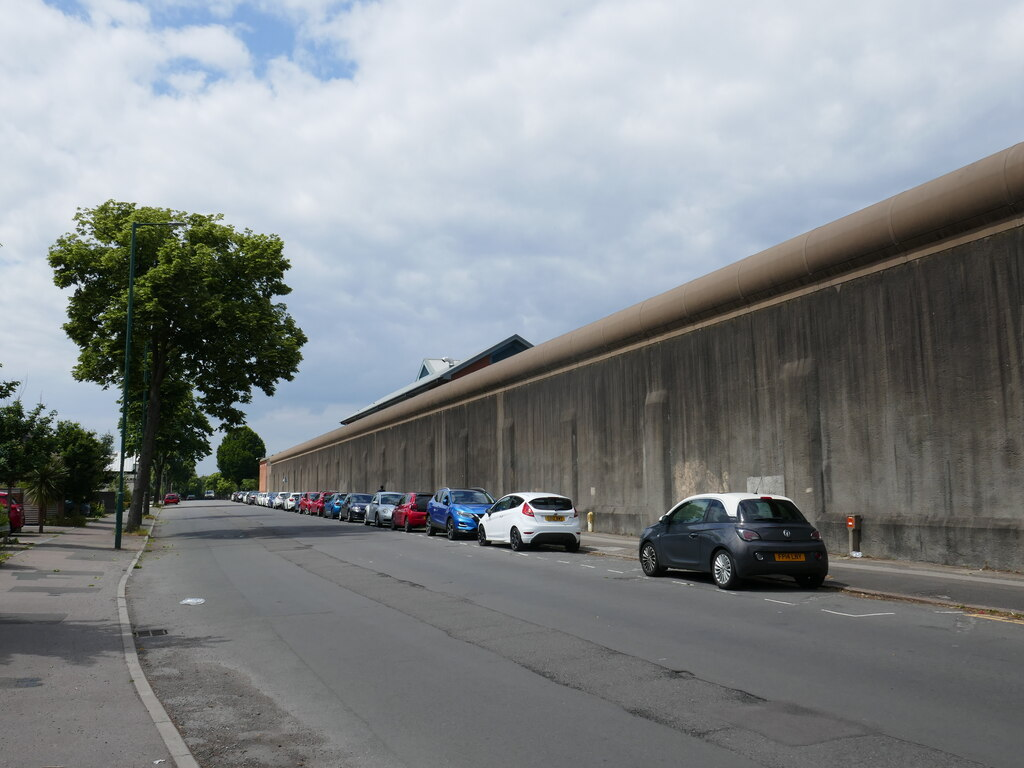
Prison wall on Perry Road

Nottingham is a Category B local prison, holding convicted and remand adult males from the local courts in Nottinghamshire and Derbyshire.

The prison provides education, workshop places and domestic duties to occupy inmates. Community projects at the prison include regular visits by local children with special needs.

Resettlement services at Nottingham offer advice on housing and debt management, as well as assistance with employment. There is also a Samaritans Listeners scheme for those prisoners who are considered to be at risk from suicide or self-harm. The Listeners scheme at HMP Nottingham is supported by listening volunteers from Nottingham Samaritans. Further information on the Samaritans Listeners scheme can be found here:

There is concern over large numbers of deaths among inmates. Notably, five prisoners died over one month in autumn 2017, four believed to be by suicide. Deborah Coles of Inquest said, "The fact these deaths occurred within days of arrival at the prison when prisoners are known to be most vulnerable, raise concerns about the processes for identifying and managing risk".

In January 2018, Peter Clarke, the Chief Inspector of Prisons wrote an urgent notification letter to Justice Secretary David Gauke, advising that three consecutive inspections had found the prison to be "fundamentally unsafe" and warning that there would be "further tragedies" unless safety measures were put in place. Clarke maintained three times in succession inspectors had found the prison, "fundamentally unsafe". Clarke also wrote, "Inspection findings at HMP Nottingham tell a story of dramatic decline since 2010." Clarke claimed, "irrefutable evidence" exists that there had been no response to findings from previous inspection and it was "extraordinary" there had failed to be a more "robust" response. Clarke claimed there were sufficient prison officers at Nottingham Prison but over half had less than a year's experience. He stated, "It appears that the problems at Nottingham are intractable and that staff there are unable to improve safety despite the fact that this failing increases the vulnerability both of those who are held in the prison and of those who work there."

There was yet another death in October 2018, the chief inspector of prisons described the prison as "dangerous" and "disrespectful". ]There have been eight suicides at Nottingham Prison since 2016. Peter Clarke suspects suicides might have happened because prisoners could not face life at the "drug-ridden jail" any longer.

== Notable inmates ==
- Ryan Colclough, professional footballer held on remand for seven weeks in HMP Nottingham for assault. In May 2026, he received a suspended sentence and returned to his football career.
- Ian Paterson, surgeon jailed for 15 years in 2017 for wounding his patients with intent by performing unnecessary surgical procedures. His sentence was later increased to 20 years by the Court of Appeal.
- Luke Foster, former professional footballer jailed for three years in 2024 for running a cannabis farm.
