= William Lockyer Dennis =

American politician

William Lockyer Dennis (1853–1919) was a member of the Wisconsin State Assembly.

== Biography ==
Dennis was born on July 19, 1853, in Carrington, Nottinghamshire, England. He moved to Milwaukee, Wisconsin in 1868.

== Career ==
Dennis was elected to the Assembly in 1888. He was a Republican.
