= Carrington, Nottingham =

Suburb of Nottingham, England

Coordinates: 52.976°N 1.156°W

Carrington
- Suburb
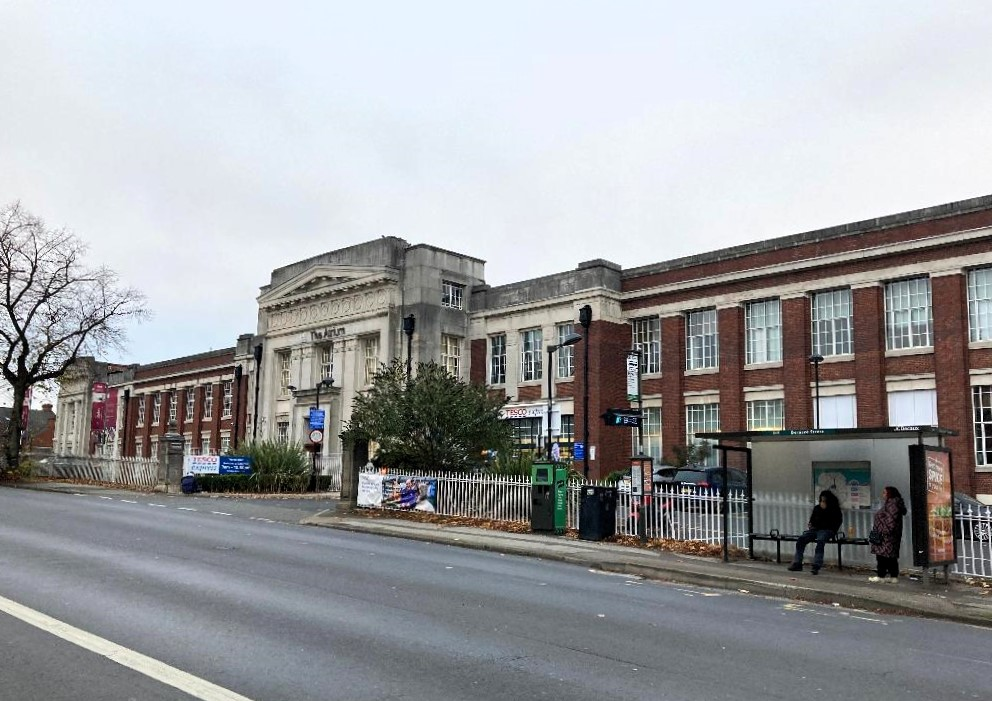
- The Atrium

- Location within the United Kingdom
- Population: 3,118
- OS grid reference: SK 56666 42440
- Unitary authority: Nottingham
- Ceremonial county: Nottinghamshire
- Country: England
- Sovereign state: United Kingdom
- Post town: NOTTINGHAM
- Postcode district: NG5
- Dialling code: 0115
- UK Parliament: Nottingham East

Carrington is a small suburb of Nottingham, England, located approximately 1.3 miles (2.1 km) north of Nottingham city centre. It lies next to the areas of Sherwood, Mapperley, Forest Fields, Basford, Sherwood Rise and the Forest Recreation Ground.

== Amenities ==
Owing to its proximity to the city centre, Carrington has a number of hotels and guest houses along its two main roads, (A60 – Mansfield Road and A611 – Hucknall Road) and hosts a varied selection of local shops and small businesses which also serve the community of Mapperley Park. Carrington is also home to Carrington Primary School rated as a Good School by Ofsted in 2013.

== History ==
In the early part of the twentieth century, horse-drawn trams ran along Mansfield Road to the stables and depot between St. John's Church and Watcombe Road. Later, this line was extended to Sherwood and upgraded to electric trams. The tram depot was replaced by Carrington Lido (open air swimming pool) and, later still, by a town-house development.

The 2418 (Sherwood) Squadron of the Air Training Corps is located in Wesley Street.

Recent years have seen the construction of a Lidl supermarket on Mansfield Road.

== Notable people ==
- Anthony Clarke Booth (1846–1899), recipient of the Victoria Cross for service during the Anglo-Zulu War
- William Lockyer Dennis (1853–1919), politician, member of the Wisconsin State Assembly.
- Chris Staniforth (1895–1954), footballer for Mansfield Town, Notts County and Oldham Athletic

== Politics ==
Carrington lies within the Nottingham City Council Sherwood ward, which has three Labour Party councillors. It lies in the Nottingham East constituency and has been represented by Labour Party MP Nadia Whittome since 2019.

== See also ==
- Church of St. John the Evangelist, Carrington
- Nottingham and District Tramways Company Limited
- Nottingham Corporation Tramways
- Miss Cullen's Almshouses
