= Nottingham Free School =

Coeducational free school in Sherwood, Nottingham

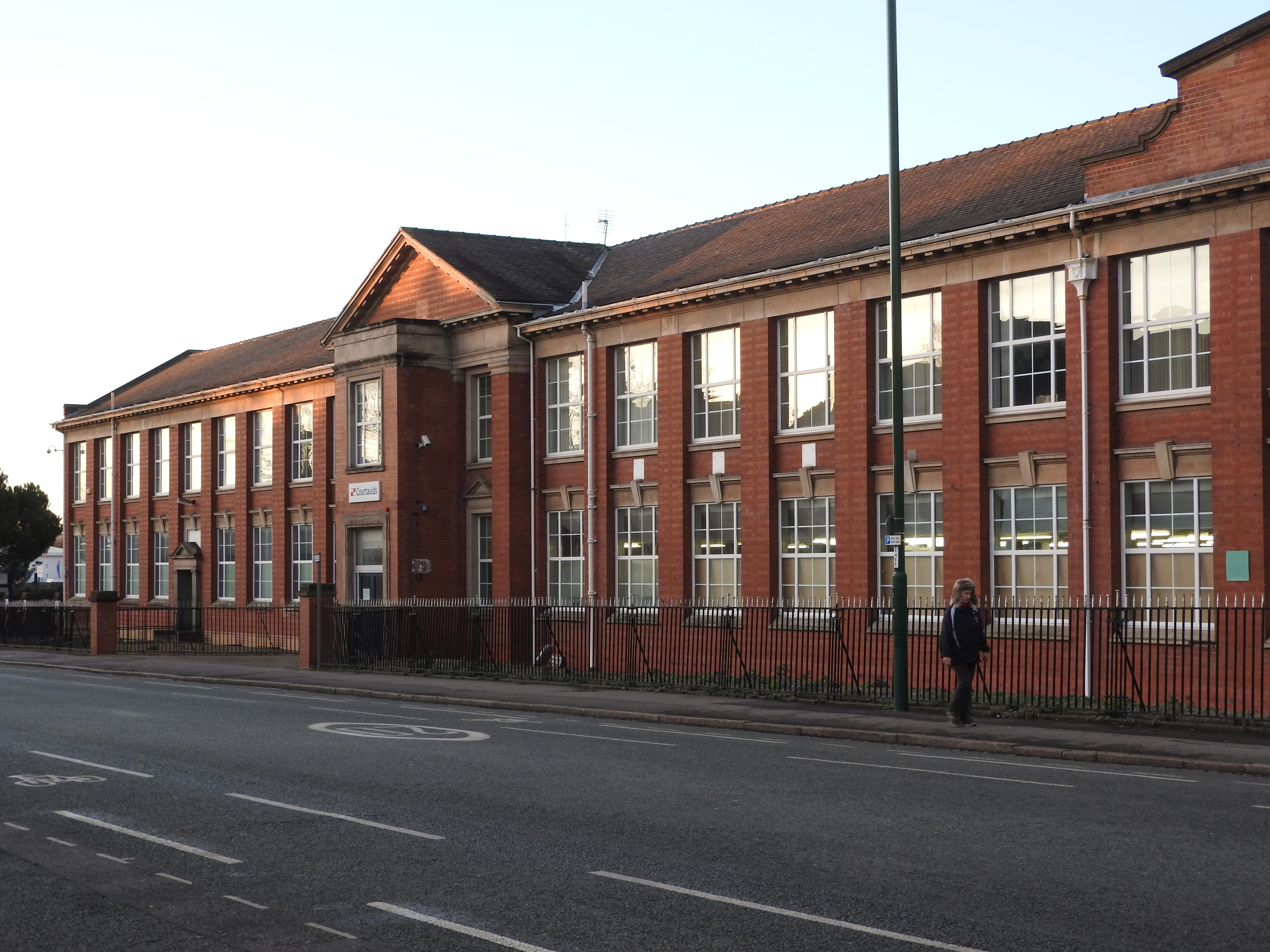

Location
- Haydn Road; Nottingham, Nottinghamshire; England; 52.9796°N 1.1596°W

Information
- Type: Free School
- Motto: Work Hard, Be Kind
- Religious affiliation: None
- Established: 2014
- Closed: N/A
- Local authority: Nottingham
- Trust: Nova Education Trust
- Department for Education URN: 141010 Tables
- Ofsted: Reports
- Chair of Governors: Sally Coulton
- Executive headteacher: Andy Seymour
- Head Teacher: Jo Simpson
- Staff: ~70
- Gender: Co-educational
- Enrolment: ~680
- Houses: Clough, Hawksley, Potter, and Torvill
- Colours: Grey and pale blue
- Website: www.nottinghamfreeschool.co.uk

Nottingham Free School is a co-educational free school which serves the areas of Sherwood, Carrington, Mapperley Park, Woodthorpe and Mapperley. The school is located in a former factory—the Courtaulds building—on Haydn Road and first opened in September 2014 with an intake of seventy-nine Year 7 students. The total number of students grew each year, and in 2019 the school expanded to include a Sixth form within the same building. The total cohort is now over 600 pupils ranging from Year 7 to Year 13.

In August 2019, the first group of students to join the school received their GCSE results.
