= Herbert Wild =

Herbert Louis Wild (2 July 1865 – 28 March 1940) was a bishop in the Church of England.

== Family ==
He was the son of Rev. R. L. Wild, rector of Hurstmonceux in Sussex.

He married Helen Christian Severn in 1903 and they had four sons and a daughter.

== Education ==
He was educated at Charterhouse School and Exeter College, Oxford where he graduated in 1886. He was ordained deacon in the Church of England in 1895.

== Career ==
He became Vice-Principal and Chaplain of St Edmund Hall, Oxford until 1903 when he became assistant curate at St. Ann's Church, Nottingham. In 1904 he was appointed vicar of Church of St. John the Evangelist, Carrington until 1909 when he returned to Oxford to be Vicar of St. Giles.

He was appointed Archdeacon of Nottingham in 1913 and nominated Bishop of Newcastle on 16 October 1915, being consecrated on 30 November. It appears that the Prime Minister H.H. Asquith, offered him the post after it had been rejected by Albert David, headmaster of Rugby School and a future Bishop of Liverpool. Wild was strongly in favour of continuing the First World War against Germany despite the heavy casualties and talk of a peace treaty. He argued that German atrocities against civilians made peace proposals unwise. 'Peace with an undefeated militarist Germany can only mean war and the endless threat of war for all time'. Wild was also keen to stress that post-War memorials should be 'for rich and poor alike', for everyone had fought for the same cause and had died as comrades together. He held that post until 1 August 1927 when he resigned due to poor health.

== Death ==
He died on 28 March 1940 aged 74.

== Sources ==
- The Times, 30 March 1940
