= Sherwood Rise =

Coordinates: 52.972005°N 1.159277°W

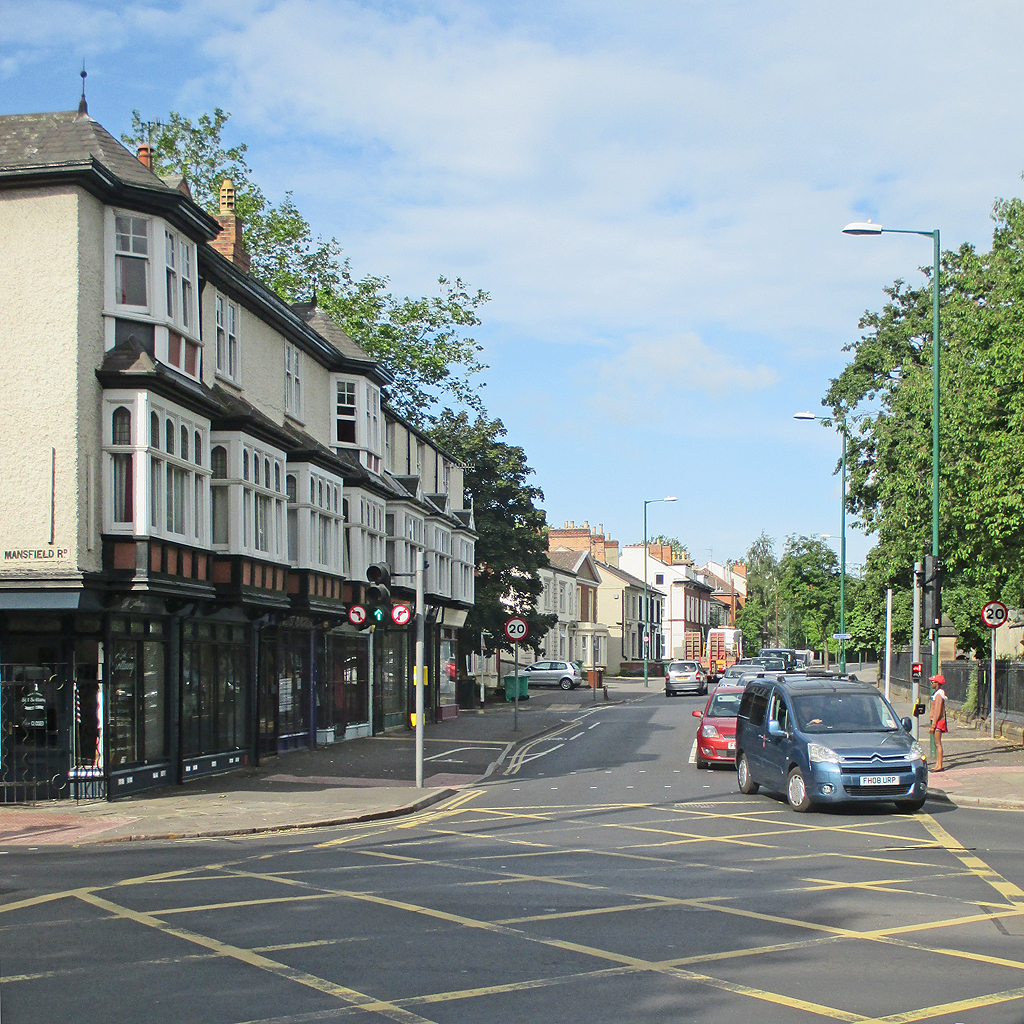

- Location within Nottinghamshire
- District: City of Nottingham
- Shire county: Nottinghamshire
- Region: East Midlands
- Country: England
- Sovereign state: United Kingdom
- Post town: NOTTINGHAM
- Postcode district: NG5, NG7
- Dialling code: 0115
- Police: Nottinghamshire
- Fire: Nottinghamshire
- Ambulance: East Midlands
- UK Parliament: Nottingham East

Sherwood Rise is a residential area in the north of the city of Nottingham in the United Kingdom. It is bordered by Carrington, Basford, Forest Fields and Sherwood.

== Politics ==
Sherwood Rise is part of the Berridge ward and the Nottingham East parliamentary constituency. The current MP is Nadia Whittome, who was elected in 2019 with a majority of over 17,000 votes. Berridge has three Labour Party councillors— Angela Kandola, Shuguftah Jabeen Quddoos and Sulcan Mahmood.

== Amenities ==
Sherwood Rise has a post office on Beech Avenue as well as several shops and cafés located across a number of streets.

The area is served by the Yellow Line Nottingham City Transport bus routes (69–71). These all begin in the city centre.
