= Manlove, Alliott & Co. Ltd. =

English company

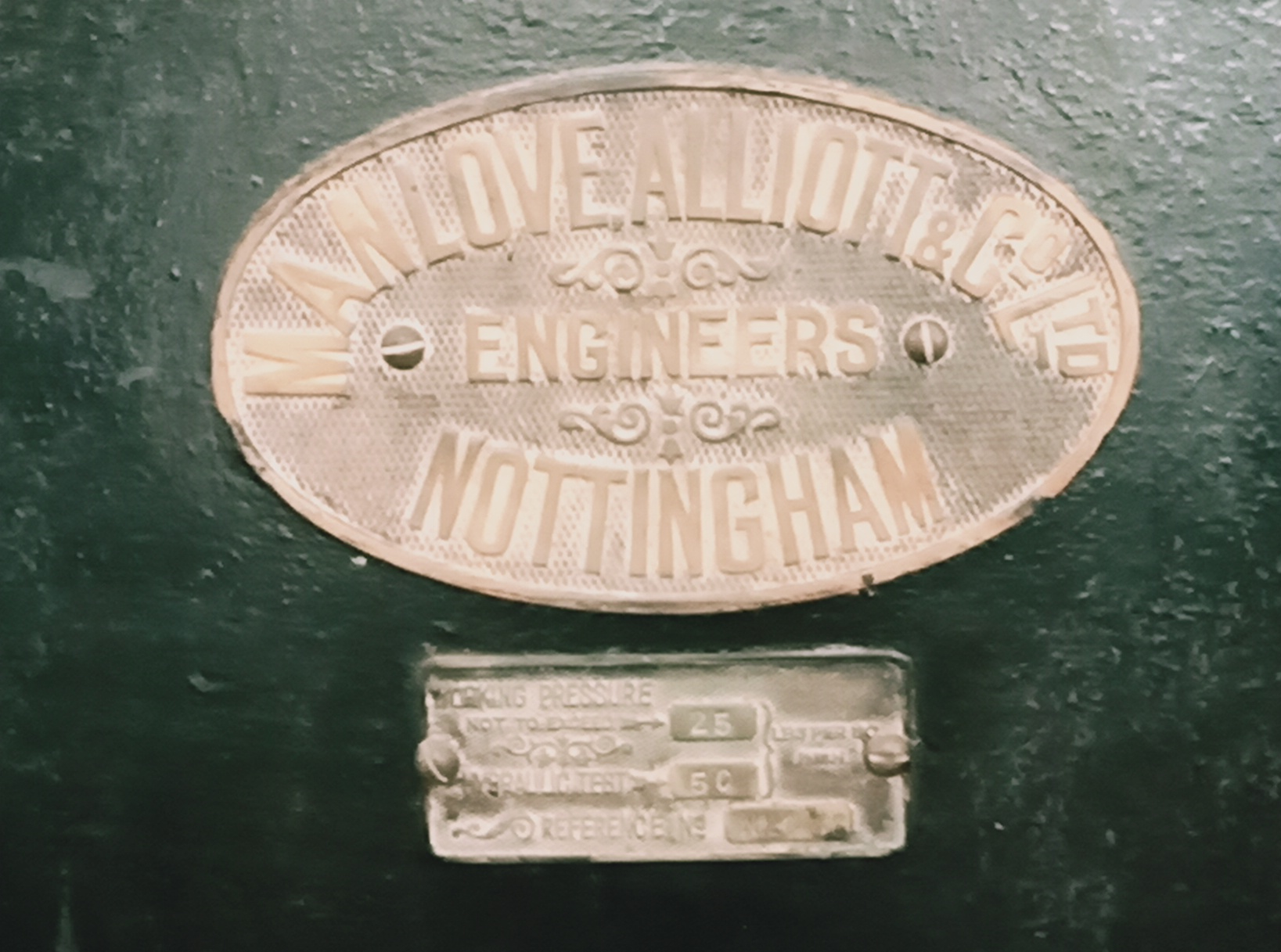

Manlove, Alliott & Co. Ltd. was an engineering company based in Nottingham, England. It was also for a time known as Manlove, Alliott, Fryer & Co. Ltd.

== History ==
Edward Manlove and Alexander Alliott were drapers by trade. With J.G. Seyrig they set up a bleaching company and developed a centrifugal drying machine as the Centrifugal Company in Nottingham. This evolved into the firm of Manlove, Allott & Co. Ltd. which was established in 1837. Initially they were based in Lenton, Nottingham but when expansion was necessary they opened their Bloomsgrove Works on Ilkeston Road in Radford, Nottingham.

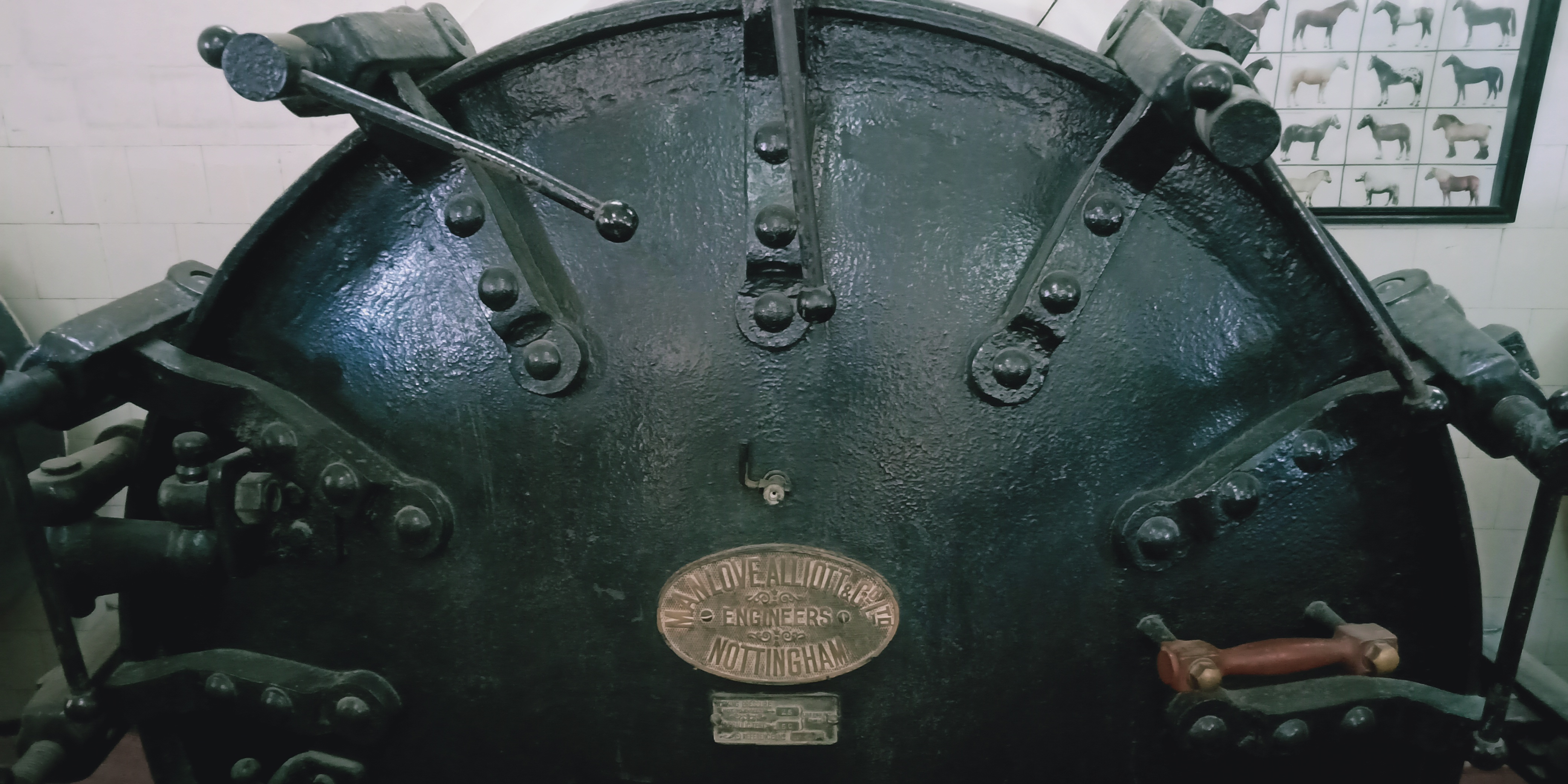
An autoclave installed at the Imperial Bacteriological Laboratory in India

The company won an award at The Great Exhibition in 1851 for its Centrifugal Washing and Drying Machine.

In 1874 the company developed the first incinerators for the destruction of waste. It was designed and patented by Alfred Fryer and originally called a Destructor.

In 1886 it was incorporated as a Limited Company. By 1891 they were supplying equipment for the Cotton Industry.

The company was awarded a royal warrant by King Edward VII.

In 1914 the company described itself as Engineers, Colonial and General. Specialities: Engines, Boilers, Sugar Machinery, Oil Mill Plant, Power Laundry Plant, Centrifugal Machines, Refuse Destructors. Employees 400.

The company existed until 1959 when it was taken over by the Melbray Group. Manufacturing continued on Ilkeston Road, Nottingham until 1969. The company offices and works have now been demolished and replaced with an industrial park.

== Products ==
This versatile firm made steam trams, one of which was designed by Edward Perrett and demonstrated in 1882 on the Nottingham and District Tramways Company Limited. It was later sold to the Dublin and Lucan Steam Tramway Company.

It also made vacuum pumps, ironing machines and centrifuges for purifying palm oil. However, it became best known for laundry machinery, steam disinfectors and sterilizers, incinerators, and drying machines.
