= Sherwood, Nottingham =

District of the city of Nottingham, England

Coordinates: 52.982°N 1.146°W

Sherwood
- Suburb
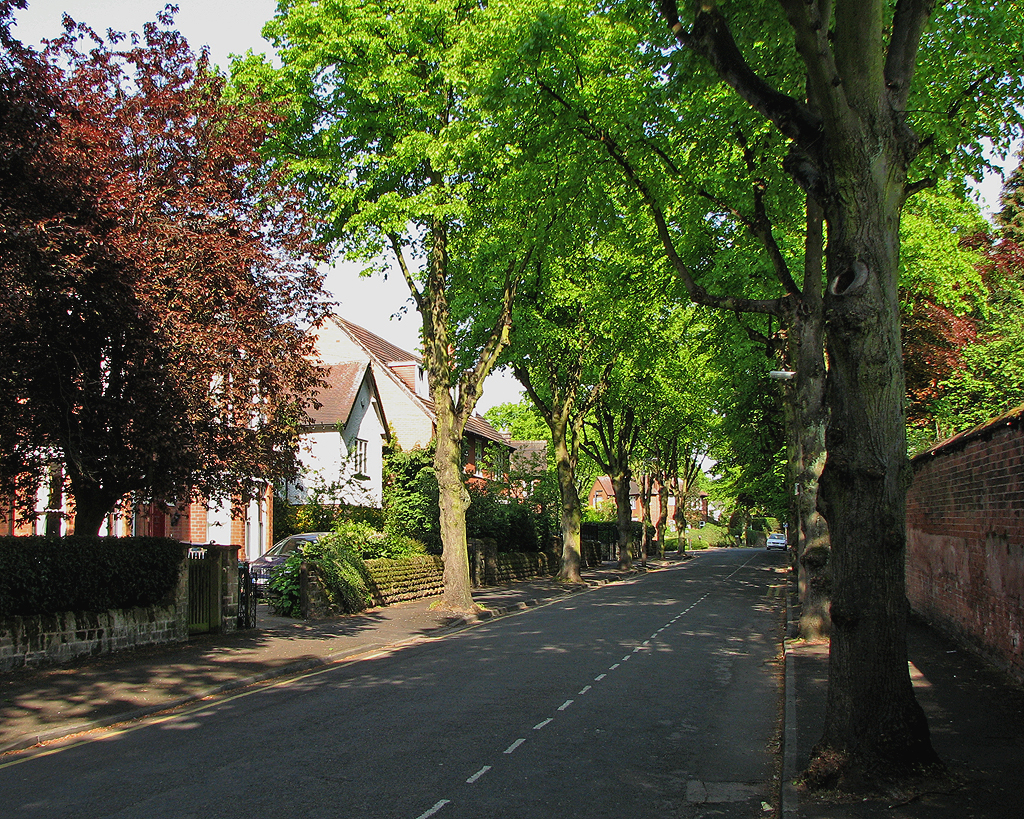
- Burlington Road

- Location within Nottinghamshire
- Population: 15,414 (2011)
- OS grid reference: SK 57329 43115
- Unitary authority: City of Nottingham
- Ceremonial county: Nottinghamshire
- Region: East Midlands
- Country: England
- Sovereign state: United Kingdom
- Post town: NOTTINGHAM
- Postcode district: NG5
- Dialling code: 0115
- Police: Nottinghamshire
- Fire: Nottinghamshire
- Ambulance: East Midlands
- UK Parliament: Nottingham East

Sherwood (/ˈʃɜːrwʊd/ SHUR-wuud) is a large district and ward and suburb of the city of Nottingham, England, 1.5 miles (2.4 km) north of the city centre. The population at the 2011 census was 15,414. It is bordered by Woodthorpe to the northeast, Mapperley to the east, Carrington to the south, New Basford and Basford to the west, and Daybrook and Bestwood to the north.

It should be carefully distinguished from Sherwood Forest, the Sherwood parliamentary constituency, and Newark and Sherwood district council, all of which lie several miles further north outside the city boundaries.

== History ==
Several carved, dated stones in buildings indicate development in the area between 1870 and 1910, during the growth of the lace industry. There are also several listed buildings.

Sherwood Bus Depot was built in 1900 by Nottingham Corporation Tramways, as part of an initiative to extend the Carrington line to Winchester Street. Trams ran on the route until 6 September 1936 when they were replaced by buses. Part of the premises is now occupied by the Samuel Hall public house, part of the J D Wetherspoon chain, and another part as community meeting rooms known as 'The Place Activity Centre', run by the Sherwood Depot Action Group.

== Notable people ==
- Julia Bell (1879–1979), geneticist
- June Spencer (1919−2024), actress

== Politics ==
The ward of Sherwood (which includes some adjacent neighbourhoods) is represented by Nottingham City Council and has three Labour Party councillors. It lies in the Nottingham East parliamentary constituency, which from 1992 until 2010 was represented by MP John Heppell, and from 2010 by Chris Leslie, who was elected with a majority of 6,969. The constituency is now represented by Labour MP Nadia Whittome.

== Amenities ==
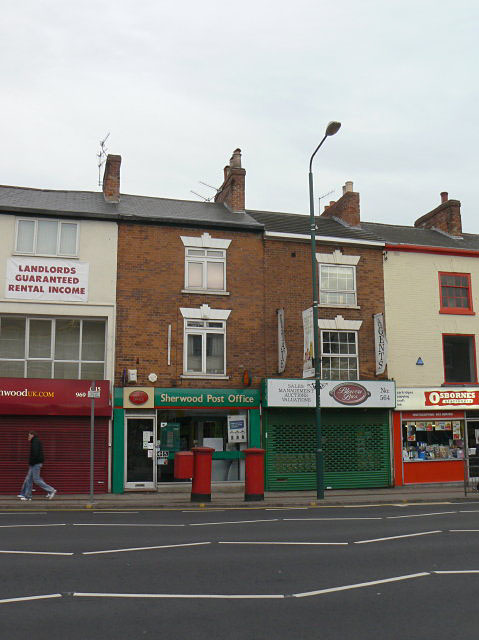
Sherwood Post Office in 2009 (since relocated)

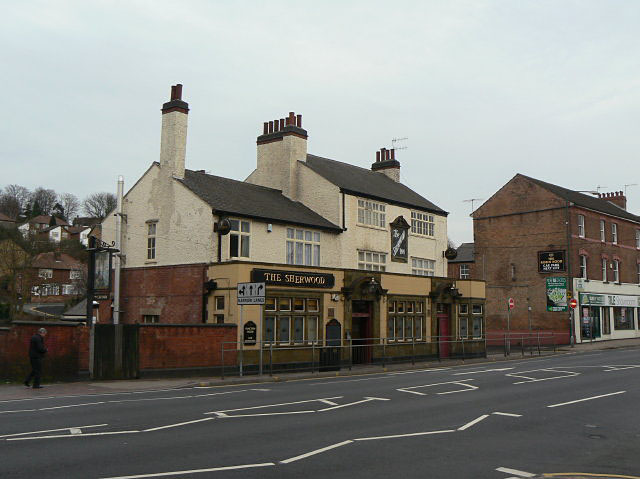
The Sherwood Inn

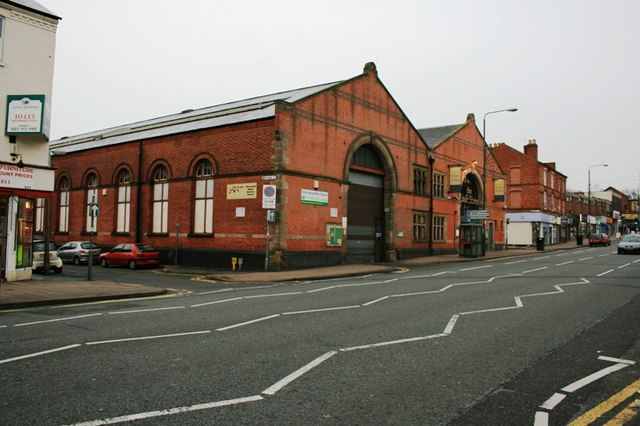
Sherwood Bus Depot from Mansfield Road

Within the area of Sherwood, there are two primary schools: Seely Primary and Nursery School on Perry Road, and Haydn Primary School on Haydn Road.

Haydn Road is also the location of Nottingham Free School, which is in Berridge Ward in the neighbourhood of New Basford.

Nottingham Prison and Young Offenders' Institute is located on Perry Road.

In October 2007, Sherwood Police Station opened at 621 Mansfield Road, allowing for a more visible local police presence. As a result, crime fell by 13% from 2008 to 2009.

The main shopping precinct lies along the busy A60 Mansfield Road. High street shops such as LloydsPharmacy, Heron Foods, and Co-op Food are interspersed with charity shops, including Oxfam and Cancer Research UK and several restaurants. Other amenities include a sub-post office, newsagents, butchers, stationers, dentists, garages, greengrocers, hairdressers, cafés, estate agencies, the Nottingham Building Society and several pubs.

The Jason Spencer Sports Ground was built in 2011 on Valley Road after the murder of local teenager, Jason Spencer. It has a basketball court, an outdoor gym and a skate park.

Sherwood Community Centre lies at the northern end of Mansfield Road, opposite the Woodthorpe Grange Park. It is the meeting place of many well established local groups such as the Bobbin Lace Society, the Sherwood Playgroup and the Prince's Trust. It also hosts a wide variety of activities, including adult ballet and tap classes, yoga, creative embroidery and Zumba.

Sherwood has a number of churches, including St Martin's Church on Trevose Gardens, Sherwood Methodist Church on Devon Drive, and United Reformed Church on Edwards Lane.

== Bus services ==
Sherwood is served by several Nottingham City Transport bus routes and is on the A60 road, an arterial thoroughfare into Nottingham city centre.

Nottingham City Transport

- 15: Nottingham – Hucknall Road (Sherwood) – City Hospital – Rise Park
- 16: Nottingham – Hucknall Road (Sherwood) – City Hospital – Top Valley – Rise Park
- 17: Nottingham – Hucknall Road (Sherwood) – City Hospital – Bulwell
- 40: Nottingham – St Ann's – Sherwood – City Hospital (40A Only)
- 56: Nottingham – Sherwood – Plains Estate – Arnold
- 58: Nottingham – Sherwood – Arnold – Killisick
- 59: Nottingham – Sherwood – Arnold – Killisick
- 87: Nottingham – Sherwood – City Hospital – Redhill – Arnold
- 88: Nottingham – Sherwood – City Hospital – Top Valley – Rise Park
- 89: Nottingham – Sherwood – City Hospital – Rise Park

Trent Barton

- The Calverton: Nottingham – Sherwood – Arnold – Calverton (A Limited Number continue to Oxton and Epperstone)
- The Threes: Nottingham – Hucknall Road (Sherwood) – City Hospital – Hucknall

Stagecoach East Midlands

- Pronto: Nottingham – Sherwood – Mansfield – Chesterfield
- Sherwood Arrow: Nottingham – Sherwood – New Ollerton
