= Church of St John the Evangelist, Carrington =

Church in Nottinghamshire, England

Church of St. John the Evangelist, Carrington
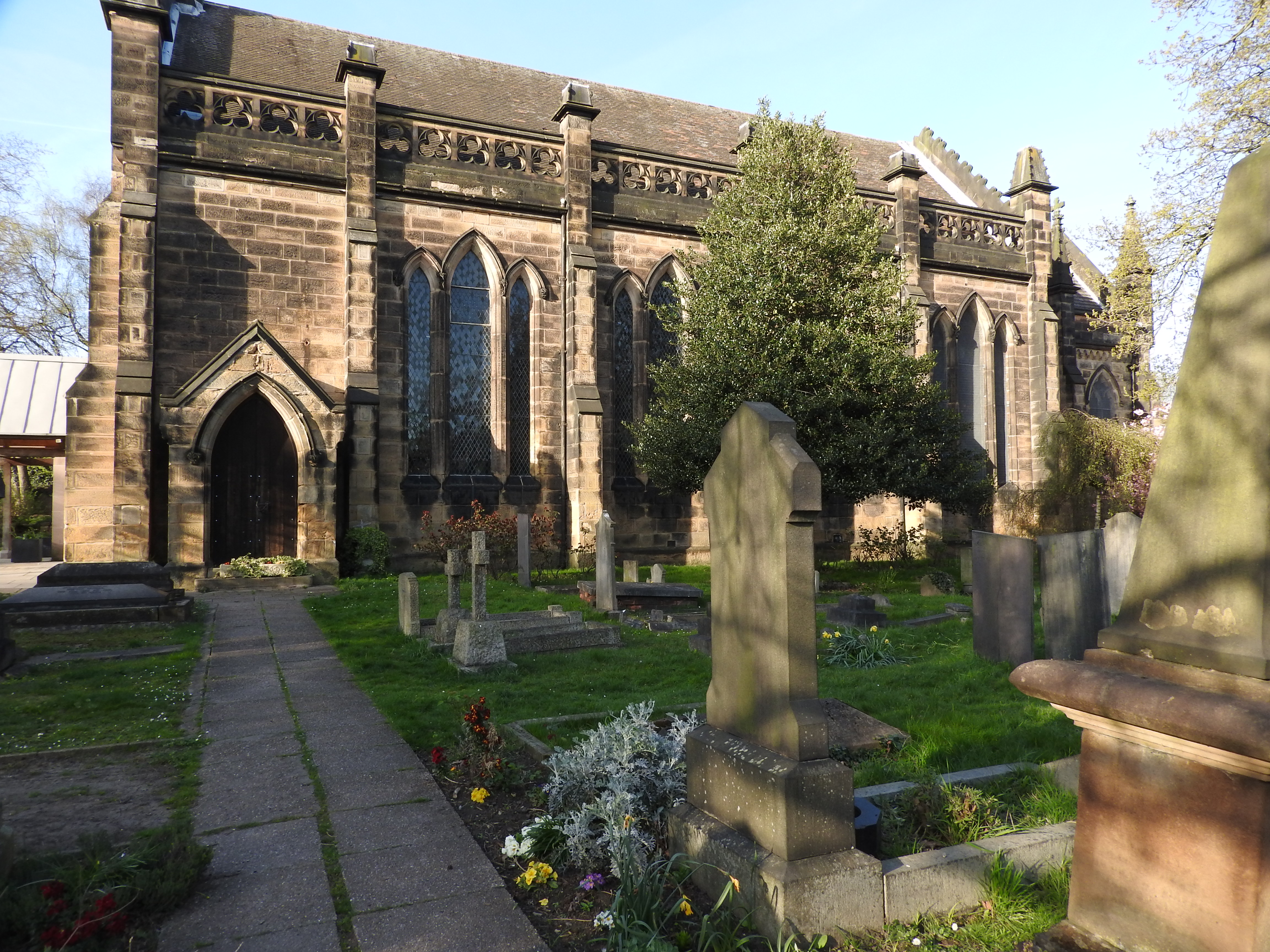
- St John's, Carrington
- Church of St. John the Evangelist, Carrington
- 52.9755°N 1.1505°W
- Denomination: Church of England
- Churchmanship: Inclusive Anglo Catholic
- Website: Church website

History
- Status: Parish Church
- Dedication: St. John the Evangelist

Architecture
- Functional status: Active

Administration
- Diocese: Diocese of Southwell and Nottingham
- Parish: Carrington, Nottingham

Clergy
- Priest: Interregnum

St. John the Evanglist, Carrington is a parish church in the Church of England in Carrington, Nottingham.

The church is Grade II listed by the Department for Digital, Culture, Media and Sport as it is a building of special architectural or historic interest.

== History ==
It was first opened in 1843 to a design by William Surplice. The chancel was added in 1866 - 1877 by Jackson & Heazell. The north aisle was added in 1922.

When the spire of Holy Trinity Church, Trinity Square was removed by October 1942 stones from the spire were used in the new drive at St John's when the entrance from Mansfield Road was walled up and a new drive created from Church Drive. Other stones were incorporated into a wall on the Carrington Lido side of the churchyard.

== Incumbents ==
- 1843–1849: T. Bleaymire
- 1849-1866: David Whalley (afterwards Rector of St. Peter's Church, Nottingham)
- 1866-1877: J. G. Wright
- 1877-1883: T. J. Rider
- 1883-1905: W. R. Sparks
- 1904-1909: Herbert Wild (later Bishop of Newcastle)
- 1909-1917: Alfred Blunt (later Bishop of Bradford)
- 1917-1947: C. Dudley Hart
- 1947-1952: Ronald Sargison
- 1952-1963: P. Black
- 1963-1978: J. S. Wilkins
- 1978-1987: G. Maltby
- 1987-1995: Andrew Burnham (later Bishop of Ebbsfleet)
- 1995-2001: J. Walker
- 2002-2013: J. M. MacGillivray
- 2014-2017: J. W. B. Tomlinson
- 2018-2020: James Pacey
- 2022-2025: Tracey Byrne

== Organ ==
The organ was installed in 1949 and was obtained second hand from a private residence in Radcliffe on Trent. It had been built in 1936 by Roger Yates. The same builder rebuilt it in St. John's Church in 1949, and it was opened on 23 February 1949 by Harry Gabb, the sub-organist of St. Paul's Cathedral. A specification of the organ can be found on the National Pipe Organ Register.

== See also ==
- Listed buildings in Nottingham (Sherwood ward)

== Sources ==
- The Buildings of England, Nottinghamshire, 1951, Nikolaus Pevsner
