= Murder of Jason Spencer =

2007 unlawful killing of a 17-year-old boy in Nottingham, England

Jason Spencer
- Born: 3 June 1989; Nottingham
- Died: 6 March 2007 (aged 17); Nottingham
- Cause of death: Murder by stabbing

Jason Spencer (3 June 1989 – 6 March 2007) was an English teenager murdered on 6 March 2007 in Sherwood, Nottingham. Reuben Valentine later pleaded guilty to murder in a trial at the Nottingham Crown Court in October 2007. Valentine initially escaped but was later arrested.

== Background ==
Spencer was born on 3 June 1989 at Nottingham City Hospital. He was born when his mother, Angela Spencer, had an emergency caesarean. He enjoyed basketball and music, and studied Music Technology at college.

== Murder ==
On 6 March 2007 Spencer arrived home after attending college, telling his mother and stepfather that he had to meet a friend about a business idea and would not be late for tea. Later that evening he was approached by Valentine who goaded Spencer into a play fight, during which Valentine's jacket was torn. When Spencer refused to pay to replace the jacket a fight ensued, and Spencer was stabbed eight times, dying at the scene.

== Arrest and trial of Valentine ==
Valentine was arrested in Nottingham after returning from a period in hiding with his family in Bristol. Prior to this, Spencer's parents had written a poem in an appeal to locate their son's killer.

At the trial in Nottingham Crown Court Valentine pleaded not guilty, claiming that the killing was accidental. Although a second man arrested at the time of the murder declined to give evidence in court having previously named Valentine as the murderer, Valentine changed his plea before entering the court to give evidence. Before declaring a verdict Judge Michael Stokes, Recorder of Nottingham, agreed with Spencer's mother describing Valentine "barbaric and evil" and recommended that he serve a minimum of sixteen years in prison.

== Jason Spencer Trust ==
In 2008 Angela Spencer and John Greensmith founded The Jason Spencer Trust to find a better way to support families bereaved due to murder and manslaughter, and to tackle knife crime. After years of fighting they have opened one of the very few support centres in Britain for families bereaved due to violent crime. The local teenagers came together to raise funds for The Jason Spencer Sports ground, which opened in 2011. Since then a skate park has been added. In April 2013, the trust opened a support centre for families bereaved due to violent crime, covering Nottingham and the East Midlands, with funding from the Ministry of Justice.
