= St Albans, Nottinghamshire =

Civil parish in Nottinghamshire, England

Coordinates: 53.012904°N 1.152492°W

St Albans
- Civil parish
- Emmanuel Church

- Location within Nottinghamshire
- Interactive map of St Albans
- Population: 3,210 (2021)
- Created: 2018
- OS grid reference: SK 563466
  - London: 110 mi (180 km) SE
- District: Borough of Gedling
- Shire county: Nottinghamshire
- Region: East Midlands
- Country: England
- Sovereign state: United Kingdom
- Settlements: Warren Hill
- Post town: NOTTINGHAM
- Postcode district: NG6
- Dialling code: 0115
- Police: Nottinghamshire
- Fire: Nottinghamshire
- Ambulance: East Midlands
- UK Parliament: Gedling
- Website: stalbansparishcouncil. gov.uk

St. Albans is a civil parish near the market town of Arnold in Gedling borough of Nottinghamshire, England. It was part of the wider Bestwood St. Albans parish, which ceased to exist in 2018, after which it was separated into Bestwood Village and St Albans. St Albans was itself further reorganised in 2026.

At the time of the 2021 census, the population was 3,210. As well as the part of Bestwood Country Park surrounding Bestwood Lodge, a former ducal residence, the parish includes the residential areas of Warren Hill, Warren Wood and 'The Gardens' on the northern outskirts of the Greater Nottingham conurbation.

== Geography ==
Much of the parish is built up with housing and extends to the inner boundary of the Nottingham green belt. There is a woodland area to the south. The parish highest point of 125 metres (410 ft) is to the far north of the parish by Gaunt's Hill.

== History ==
=== Toponymy ===
The St Albans name is a historical reference to the Duke of St Albans, the family being prominent local landholders and residents in the area until the 20th century.

=== Events ===
The parish holds some proof of its prehistoric past, with relics from that era including finds of stone axes, flint tools and early earthworks indicating activity during the Stone, Bronze and Iron ages, dating from 6000 BC onwards. Another local artefact found in modern times was a coin from the Late Roman era of around 300 AD. Much of the area was heavily forested and very little development took place until the Norman invasion of 1066, with the whole of this becoming part of the much wider Sherwood Forest hunting grounds. Bestwood became a component of this, being first referred to from the early 13th century in local records. Bescwode Hay as this was known, was listed as being around 3,711 acres (5.798 sq mi; 1,502 ha; 15.02 km^{2}) in size. Forest laws were enforced by stewards or wardens, with royalty, nobility, and the wealthy hunting at the grounds.

The first Bestwood hunting lodge was thought to have been built for Henry I in the early 1100's, but written evidence only occurs in 1286 during Edward I's reign. Outlaws (including possibly Robin Hood) were known to roam the area and rewards were routinely offered by the authorities. In 1330, it was at the lodge where the young king Edward III plotted to overthrow his mother, Isabella of France and Roger Mortimer. Later in the 14th century, a palisade fence and ditches were built around the area, its boundaries being the road from Nottingham to Mansfield and the River Leen to the west and the road from Nottingham to York on the east, becoming a formal deer park by 1351. Over the following centuries, forests saw lessening usage and by the early 1600s the lack of upkeep to the fence was reported. However, in 1627 under Charles I, the lodge was repaired so as to sublet the land and increase income.

Charles II and his mistress, Nell Gwyn, would visit the lodge at Bestwood, with him leasing Bestwood Lodge and the park to her in 1681. It was further bequeathed to both Gwyn and their son Charles Beauclerk, 1st Duke of St Albans in 1683, the title of Duke also being bestowed to him in 1687. However, the first few generations resided elsewhere. During the 1700s, much of the surrounding land was enclosed into farms, with only a small portion of Bestwood Park remaining forested. The hunting lodge was later rebuilt as Bestwood Lodge in 1863 on instructions of the 10th Duke by architect S.S. Teulon, after the decision to base his seat there. The present-day Bestwood Emmanuel Anglican Church belonged to the Duke's family as their chapel, it was also built by Teulon in 1869. The area south and west of the lodge was converted into farmland as well as Bestwood Colliery towards the turn of the 20th century.

Later Dukes did not reside at the lodge, and after 1900 it was leased to local entrepreneurs, one being Sir Frank Bowden who was a key investor in the Nottingham Raleigh cycle business. The northern boundary of Nottingham was extended outwards in 1933 close to the colliery and the forested edges of Bestwood Park, where it has remained since. The estate was sold in 1939, with most of the southern farmland obtained by Nottingham City Corporation for housing, resulting in the Bestwood Estate, Bestwood Park, Top Valley and Rise Park suburbs built from 1940 to the late 1970s. The area north of the city boundary bar the colliery area was purchased by Arnold Urban District council for building houses, however the area around the Lodge was requisitioned by the military for use as a World War II wartime camp and training facility, with shooting ranges, trenches and a control base for Northern Command being set up.

After the war, the army continued to hold the area, and by the mid 1960s housing was being built along the Bestwood Lodge Drive and Woodchurch Roads up to the city boundary for their use. The military progressively returned control of the site to the local authority and its successor Gedling Borough Council from 1973 onwards. The colliery closed in 1967, with the area subsequently bought by Nottinghamshire County Council and landscaped, combining their ownership of the area with Gedling council to form Bestwood Country Park which opened in 1985. Big Wood School was built in 1976-80. The Nottinghamshire Fire and Rescue Service headquarters was opened on the site of old army facilities in March 1985 by the Prince and Princess of Wales.

From 1974 the Nottingham city area became administratively part of the wider county, and the decision was taken by the county council to extend the building of the new suburbs past the city boundary up to the parkland area. Warren Hill and the other residential areas in St Albans were largely complete by 1990. Nottingham City Council was made administratively independent in 1998, its pre-1974 boundary being re-established. In 2018, with residents requesting increased identity and self-determination, St Albans was split off from the wider Bestwood St. Albans civil parish administratively. In 2022, Nottinghamshire Fire and Rescue Service moved their headquarters out of the parish to a shared premises with Nottinghamshire Police, and the building due to be demolished to allow homes to be built. In 2026, further local government reorganisation reduced the size of the parish, with Deer Park being spun off as a separate council area.

== Demographics ==
At the time of the 2021 census, the population was 3,210, a drop from the 2011 census count of 3,290.

== Economy ==
There is a small industrial area that spills over into the Nottingham city area, Woodview Business Park.

== Community ==
The residential areas are subdivided into defined areas:

Warren Hill – named for The Warren area of the Country Park, which it abuts – Muirfield Road, Bewcastle Road (from Muirfield Road up to Emmanuel Avenue), Emmanuel Avenue, Plantation Close, Tyburn Close, Jermyn Drive, Fenchurch Close, Aldwych Close, Stockdale Close, Shacklock Close, Edmonds Close, Ludgate Close, Finsbury Road, Hatton Close, Gerrard Close, Brompton Close, Lambeth Road.

Warren Wood – close to The Warren and Big Wood park areas – Cairngorm Drive, Cheviot Close, Chiltern Close, Church View Close, Emmanuel Avenue, Grampian Drive, Pennine Close, Pentland Drive, Plantation Close, Quantock Close, St. Emmanuel View.

The Gardens – Augustine Gardens, Lindisfarne Gardens, Iona Gardens, Tithe Gardens, Boniface Gardens, Wearmouth Gardens, Ruthwell Gardens, Hadrian Gardens, Jarrow Gardens, Chad Gardens, Aidan Gardens, Hexham Gardens, Benedict Court.

There is a small central area for exercise, Muirfield recreation ground.

== Landmarks ==
There are two listed buildings of architectural merit, Emmanuel Church Bestwood which is Grade II* designated, its lychgate is at Grade II.

== Education ==
Schools include:

- Oakwood Academy (previously Big Wood School)
- Warren Primary Academy

== Religious sites ==
- Emmanuel Church Bestwood (Anglican)
- Warren Hill Community Church
