= Bulwell Hall Estate =

Coordinates: 53.014°N 1.191°W

Bulwell Hall
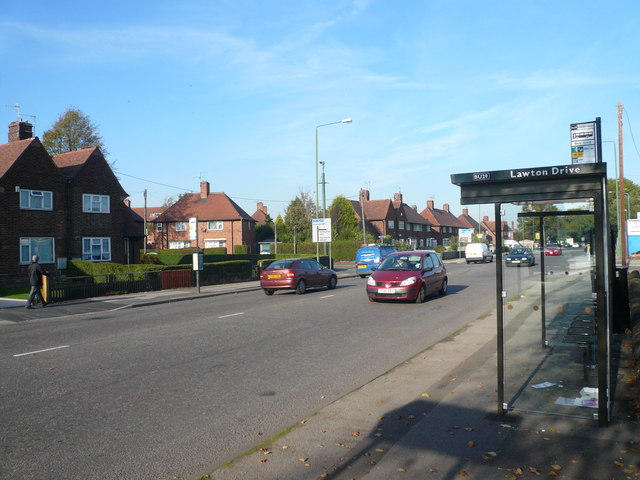
- Hucknall Lane in October 2007

- Location within Nottinghamshire
- Population: 2,181
- OS grid reference: SK 54269 46639
- District: City of Nottingham
- Shire county: Nottinghamshire
- Region: East Midlands
- Country: England
- Sovereign state: United Kingdom
- Post town: NOTTINGHAM
- Postcode district: NG6
- Dialling code: 0115
- Police: Nottinghamshire
- Fire: Nottinghamshire
- Ambulance: East Midlands
- UK Parliament: Nottingham North

Bulwell Hall Estate is a council estate in the City of Nottingham, and is located in the Bulwell ward. The estate is located roughly 0.9 miles (1.4 km) from Bulwell and about 5 miles (8 km) from the city centre. Surrounding areas include Hucknall and Bestwood Village towards the north, Rise Park to the east and Bulwell to the south. At the 2001 Census, the estate had a population of 2,181.

== Facilities ==
Most facilities in the estate are located on Hucknall Road and include shops, a car wash, a convenience store, and takeaways as well as a primary school, a community centre and a care home located on Lawton Drive.

== Demographics ==
According to the data of the 2001 Census, the estate has a population of 2,181, and a majority of the population are aged 25–44, who make up 28.7% of the population.

The census also shows that 94.3% of the population is White British, as well as 0.5% being White Irish and 1.3% being classed as Other White. 2.0% of the population is Mixed Race, 0.3% is Asian or Asian British and 1.6% of the estate's population is Black or Black British.

== Religion ==
The 2001 Census shows that 52.1% of the population are Christian and 31.% of the population have no religion. 0.3% of the population is Muslim, other religions make up 0.4% of the estate's population and 15.2% of the population did not state their religion.

== Transport ==
=== Tram services ===
The Moor Bridge tram stop is located within the estate, and has frequent services to Hucknall and Toton Lane as part of NET's Line 1 service.

Preceding station	NET	Following station
Butler's Hill towards Hucknall	Line 1	Bulwell Forest towards Toton Lane

Tram services in Bulwell Hall, Nottingham
Tram operator	Line	Destination(s)	Notes
Nottingham Express Transit	1	Toton Lane → Beeston → QMC → NG2 Business Park → Railway Station → Nottingham → The Forest → Wilkinson Street → Highbury Vale → Bulwell → Bulwell Hall → Hucknall	

=== Bus services ===
The estate has frequent bus services that travel through Hucknall Road by several different bus companies, mostly services ran by Nottingham City Transport.

Bus services in Bulwell Hall, Nottingham
Bus operator	Line	Destination(s)	Notes
Nottingham City Transport	79	Nottingham → Alfreton Road → Nuthall Road → Cinderhill → Bulwell → Bulwell Hall → Rise Park → Warren Hill → Bestwood Park → Arnold	
Nottingham City Transport	79A	Nottingham → Alfreton Road → Nuthall Road → Cinderhill → Bulwell → Bulwell Hall → Rise Park → Top Valley → Bestwood Park → Arnold	
Nottingham City Transport	79B	Nottingham → Alfreton Road → Nuthall Road → Cinderhill → Bulwell or Rise Park	
Nottingham City Transport	A2	Bulwell Hall → Bestwood Park → Edwards Lane → Ring Road → Trinity/Bluecoat/Nottingham Academy	
Nottingham City Transport	N68	Nottingham → Sherwood Rise → Basford → Highbury Vale → Bulwell → Hempshill Vale → Snape Wood → Bulwell Hall (Moor Bridge)	
Trentbarton	threes	Nottingham → Bulwell Hall → Hucknall → Kirkby → Sutton → Mansfield	
Nottingham Community Transport	L6	Bulwell → Bulwell Hall → Bulwell Morrisons	
Nottingham Community Transport	L11	Beeston → Wollaton Vale → Bilborough → Aspley → Basford → Cinderhill → Bulwell → Bulwell Morrisons → Bulwell Hall → Top Valley → Bestwood Park → Arnold	
Littles	Hucknall Citylink	Nottingham → City Hospital → Bulwell Hall → Hucknall	
Nottsbus Connect	528	Selston → Underwood → Moorgreen → Watnall → Nuthall → Phoenix Park → Bulwell → Bulwell Hall → Bestwood Village	
