= The Dukeries =

Area of Nottinghamshire, England

Coordinates: 53°17′N 1°06′W

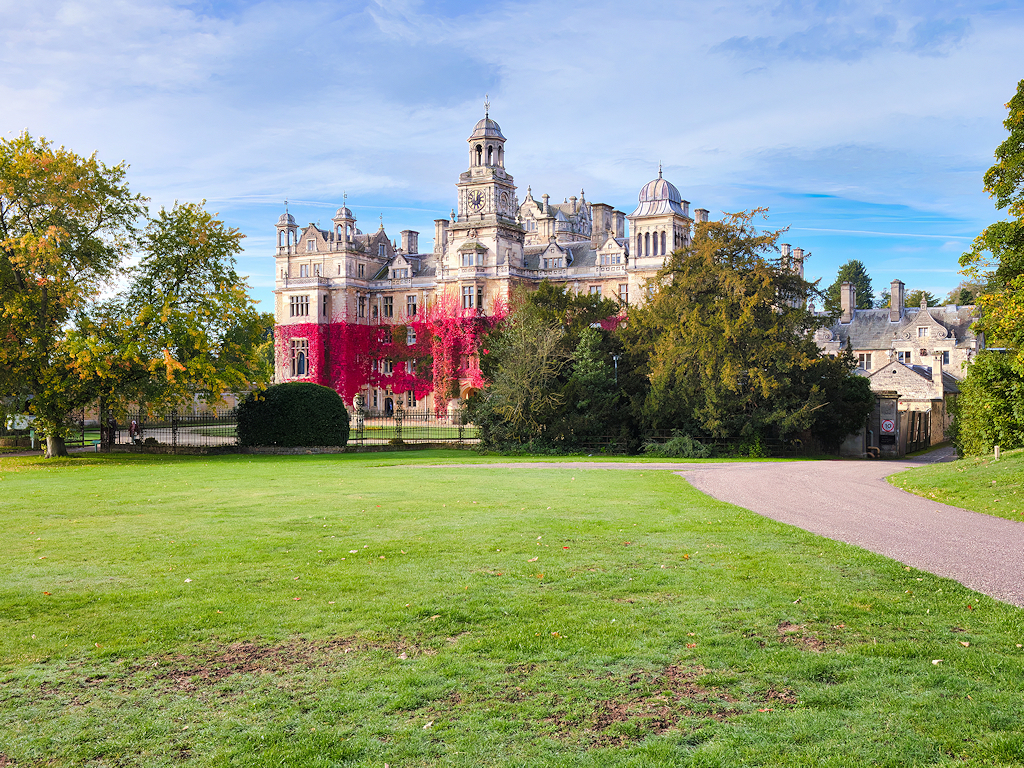
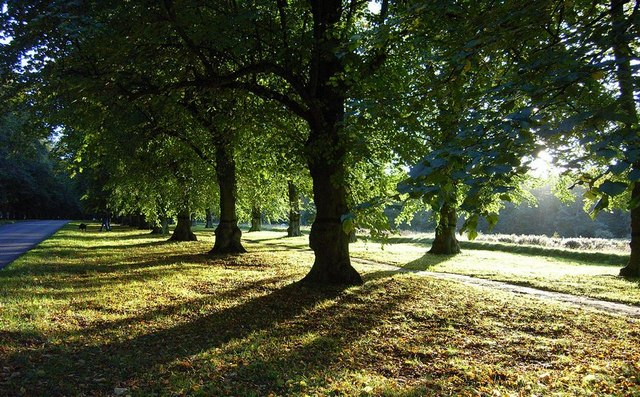
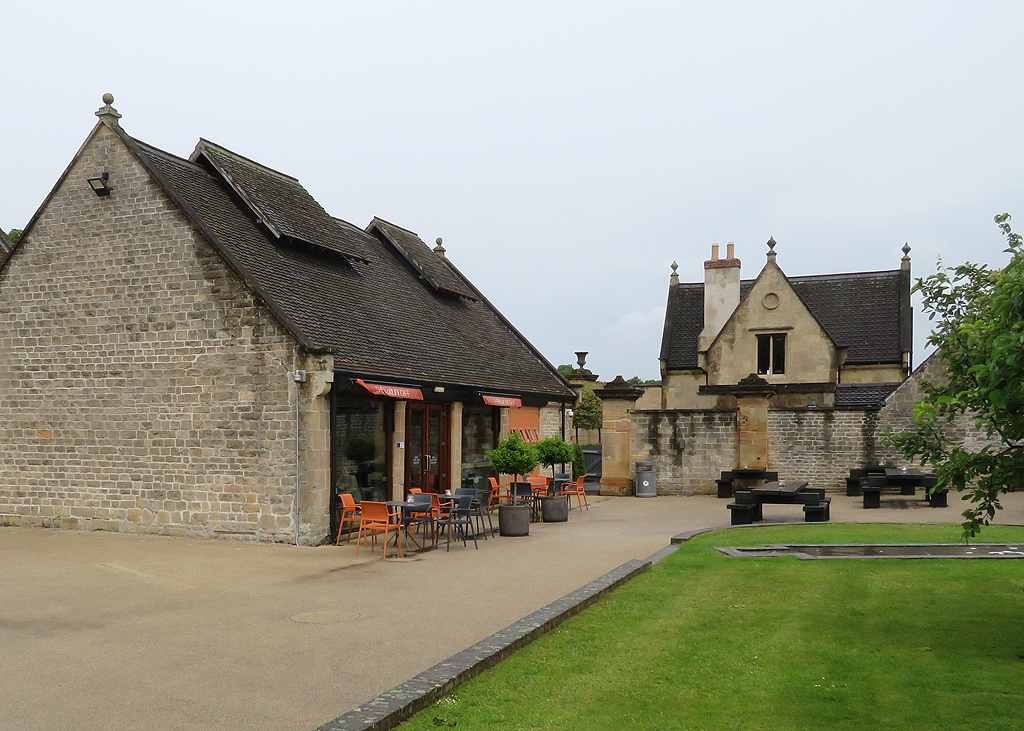
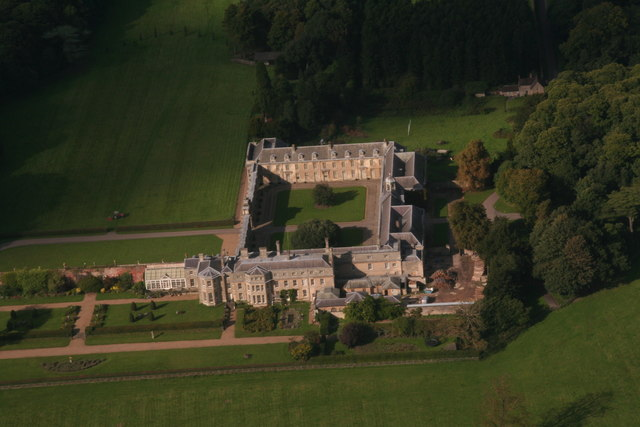
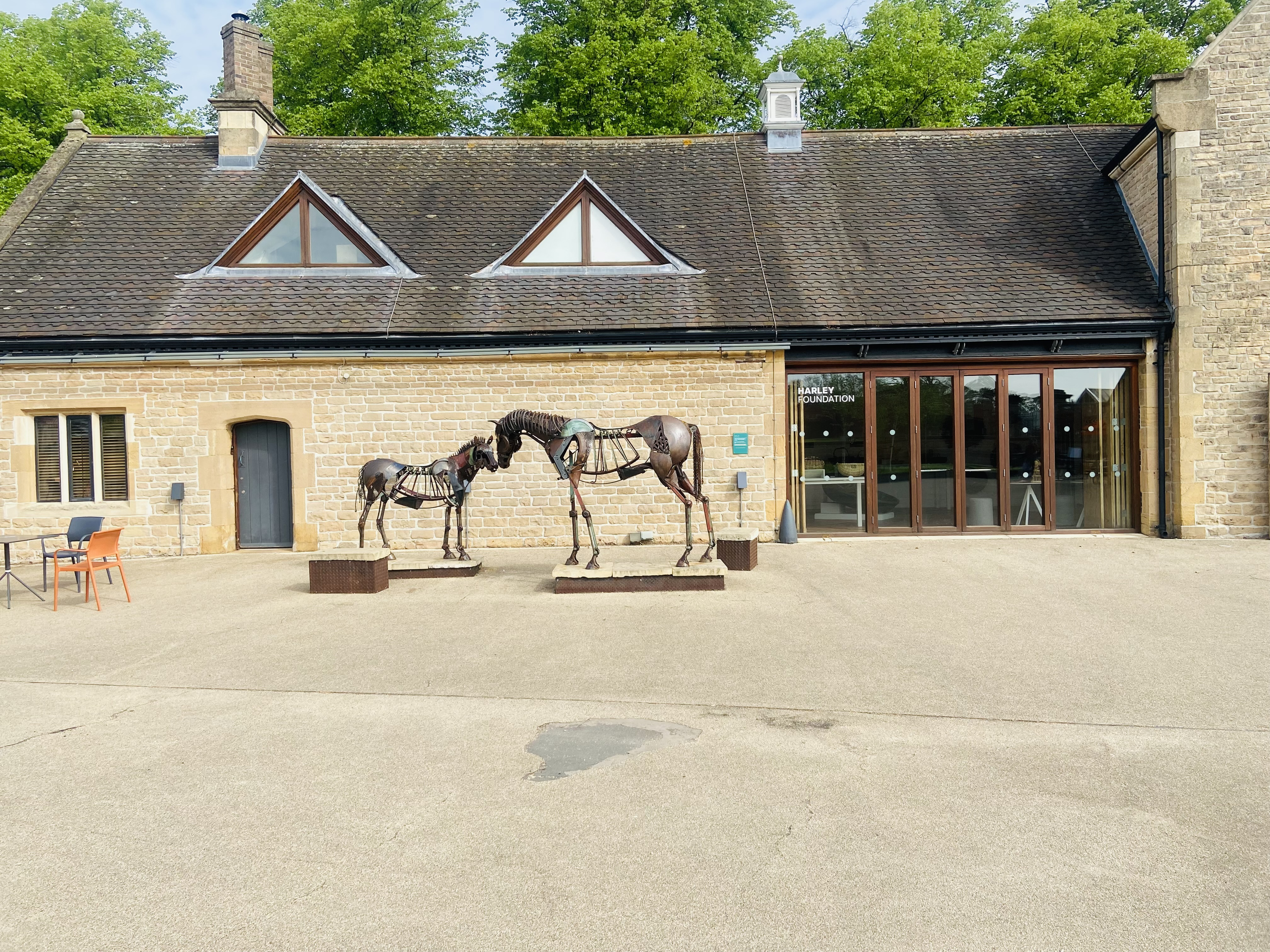
- Thoresby Hall Clumber Park Harley Cafe at Welbeck Abbey Worksop Manor Harley Gallery and Foundation

- Location within Nottinghamshire
- Area: 11.12 sq mi (28.8 km^{2})
- District: Bassetlaw
- Shire county: Nottinghamshire
- Region: East Midlands
- Country: England
- Sovereign state: United Kingdom
- Police: Nottinghamshire
- Fire: Nottinghamshire
- Ambulance: East Midlands

The Dukeries is an area of the county of Nottinghamshire so called because it contained four ducal seats. It is south of Worksop, which has been called its "gateway". The area was included within the ancient Sherwood Forest.

== History ==
In the 17th and 18th century’s Charles II and then Queen Anne sold large areas of Sherwood Crown Land to private owners who built the estates of Thoresby Hall, Clumber House, Welbeck Abbey and Worksop Manor.

The Dukes of Kingston, Newcastle under Lyme, Norfolk, and Portland were descendants of the Countess of Shrewsbury, Bess of Hardwick. The Marquess of Halifax of Rufford Abbey was also a descendent of Bess.

== Ducal seats ==
- Worksop Manor: a home of the Dukes of Norfolk, and nearest to Worksop
- Welbeck Abbey: seat of the Dukes of Portland
- Thoresby Hall: seat of the Dukes of Kingston (later of the Earls Manvers)
- Clumber House: seat of the Dukes of Newcastle, since demolished

A fifth large country house, Rufford Abbey in this area belonged to the 2nd to 8th Savile baronets, their later-to-be ennobled heirs (with the territorial designation of Halifax), then from 1888 until 1938 to 1st to 3rd Lords Savile. Welbeck Woodhouse is a further notable mansion, in the former park (grounds) of Welbeck Abbey and was built by Lord Titchfield in the 1930s.

=== Gallery ===
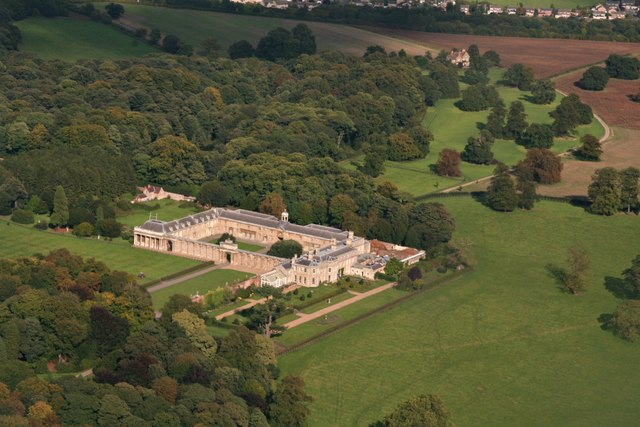
Worksop Manor

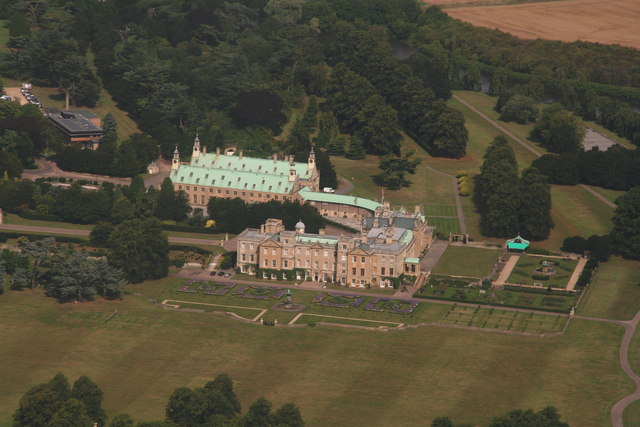
Welbeck Abbey

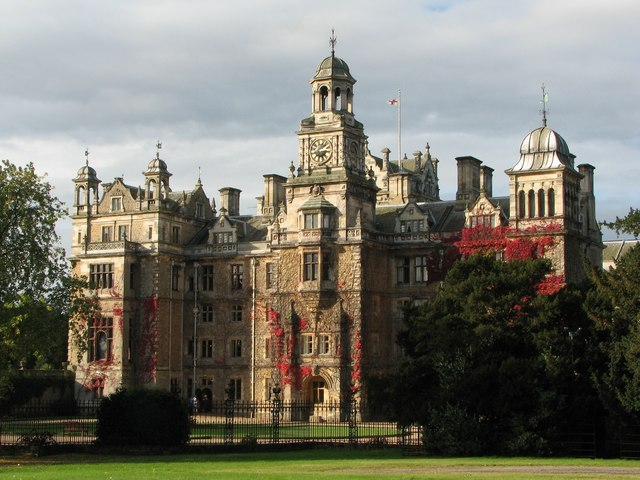
Thoresby Hall, rebuilt 1868–1874; now a hotel

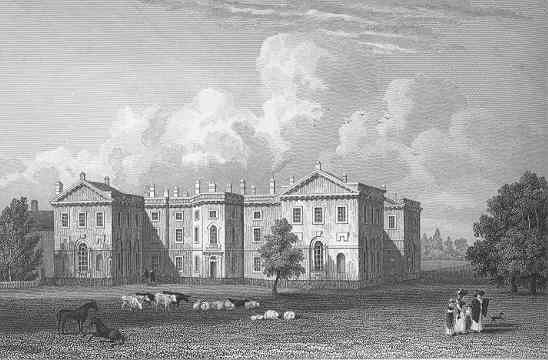
Clumber House

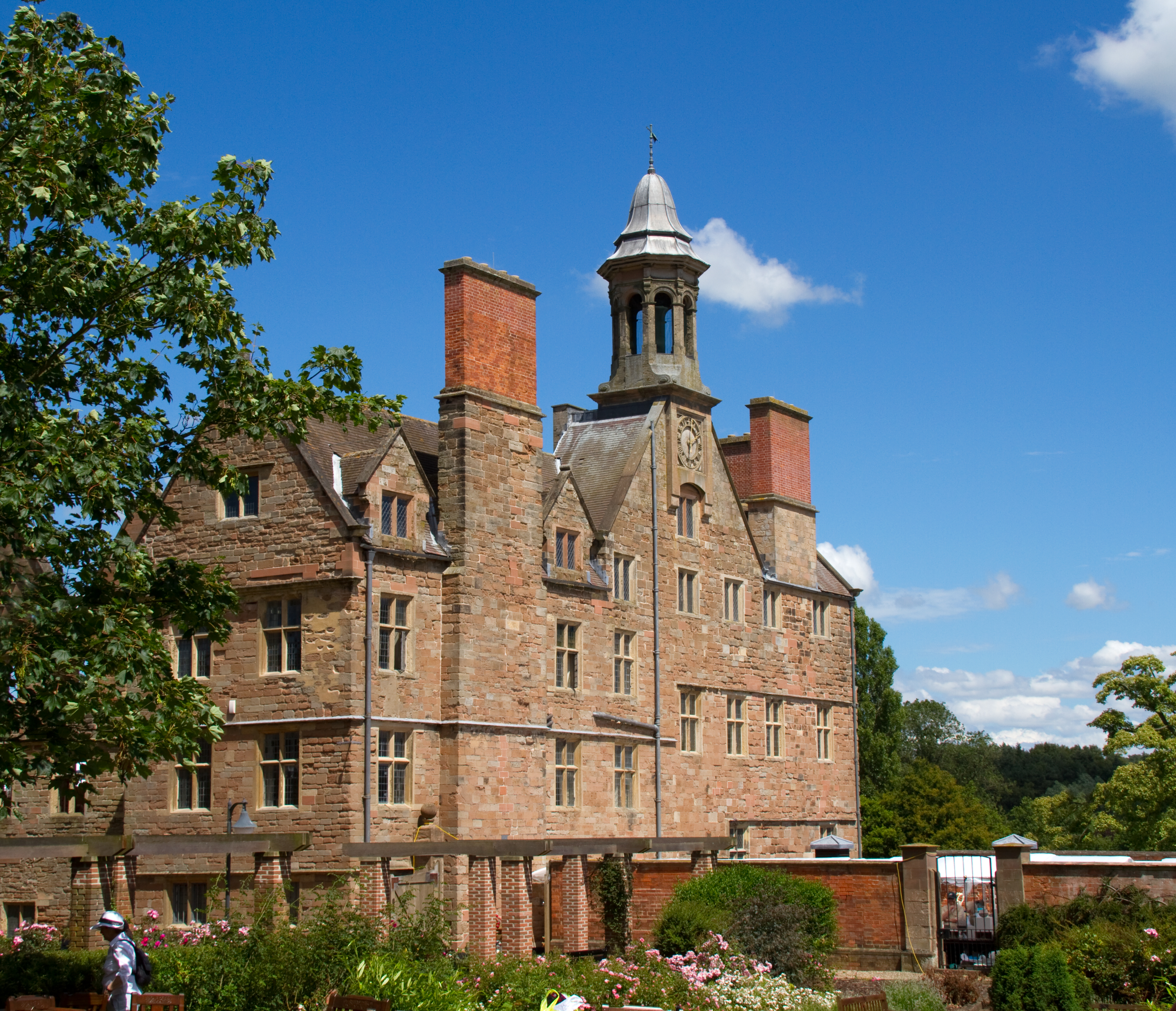
Rufford Abbey

== Character ==
The Dukeries saw four ducal families close together among the less than twenty current (extant) English dukedoms and their parks or farmed lands largely neighbouring to the point of being at most points touching (contiguous). The last mansion in single-family occupation is Welbeck Abbey – by a great-nephew of Victor Cavendish-Bentinck, 9th Duke of Portland, the last duke. William Cavendish-Bentinck, 7th Duke of Portland had neighbouring Welbeck Woodhouse built in the early 1930s when he bore his courtesy marquessate style. The latter property is equally intact, 0.75 miles (1.21 km), north east of the main house and 200 feet (61 m) long. Bernard Howard, 12th Duke of Norfolk sold Worksop Manor to Henry Pelham-Clinton, 4th Duke of Newcastle in 1839. The Norfolks preferred to spend more time at Arundel Castle and the Duke of Newcastle wanted the land to enlarge his estate and had the main part of the house demolished. The service wing was adapted into a smaller mansion-esque country house later in the 19th century, which survives.

Clumber House was demolished by the Dukes of Newcastle in the 1930s because they could no longer afford it but the Victorian chapel survived and the 3,800 acres (15 km^{2}) park now belongs to the National Trust. Thoresby Hall opened as a country house hotel early in the 21st century after a period of neglect, though the wider Thoresby Estate remains in the hands of the descendants of the Dukes of Kingston. Although not part of the Dukeries, Nottingham Castle, a former residence of the Dukes of Newcastle, is also in Nottinghamshire, as is the former seat of the Dukes of St Albans at Bestwood Lodge. Bestwood St Albans, a civil parish in the Gedling borough of Nottinghamshire, maintained a link with the Dukes of St Albans through its name until 31 March 2018, after which date it was replaced by Bestwood Village parish and St Albans parish.

== Economic history ==
In the early 20th century the economic and social base of the Dukeries was dramatically influenced by the development of its underlying coalfield, the eastern extension of the Nottinghamshire field. Five coal mines were opened after the first shaft sinking commenced in 1920. The coal mines were at Clipstone (coal won 1922), Ollerton (1925), Blidworth (1926), Bilsthorpe (1927) and Thoresby near Edwinstowe (1928). The landowners auctioned or leased their mineral rights: Earl Manvers' Thoresby estate in May 1919 and Lord Savile of Rufford Abbey's lease for Ollerton in 1921. Colliery companies such as the Butterley Company at Ollerton and the Stanton Company at Thoresby bought the rights. The companies financed the construction of pit villages to house miners and their families, who migrated from older coalfields in Britain.

The villages offered facilities, such as a distinctive heating system, provided by the mine running pipes between houses in New Ollerton. While displaying characteristics of paternalism the villages were restrictive, as some companies employed company policemen and discouraged trade unionism, apart from the breakaway Nottinghamshire Miners' Industrial Union (NMIU) of George Spencer in the 1930s. Work at the Dukeries collieries did not cease even during the coal and general strike of 1926. The Labour Party was not electorally successful in the mining villages until 1946, after the Second World War had weakened the power of the employers.
