= Bestwood Lodge =

Country house in Nottinghamshire, England

Coordinates: 53.0128649°N 1.1525432°W

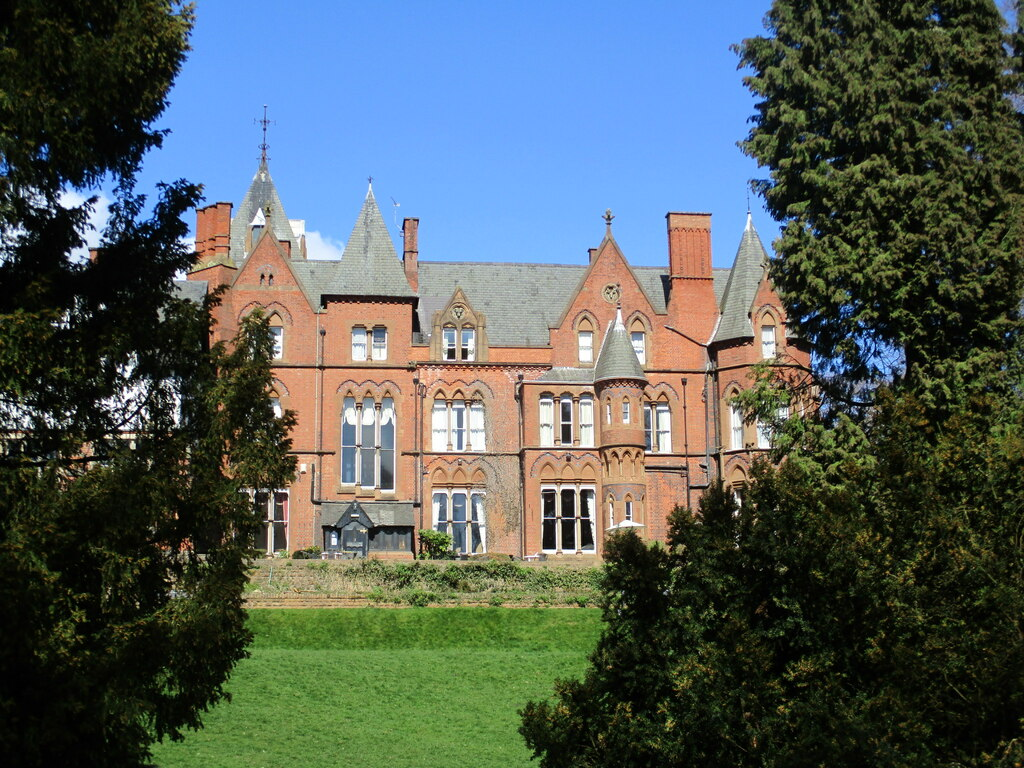
- Bestwood Lodge in 2022

- Location within Nottinghamshire

General information
- Architectural style: Gothic Revival
- Location: Deer Park, Nottinghamshire, England
- Year built: 1862–65
- Client: 10th Duke of St Albans

Design and construction
- Architect: Samuel Sanders Teulon

Listed Building – Grade II*
- Official name: Bestwood Lodge Hotel and terrace wall
- Designated: 13 December 1972
- Reference no.: 1227444

Bestwood Lodge is a Grade II* listed 19th-century country house in the civil parish of Deer Park, Nottinghamshire, England. It was built in the Gothic Revival style in 1862–65 for the 10th Duke of St Albans by architect Samuel Sanders Teulon. It has been operated as the Bestwood Lodge Hotel since the 1970s.

== History ==
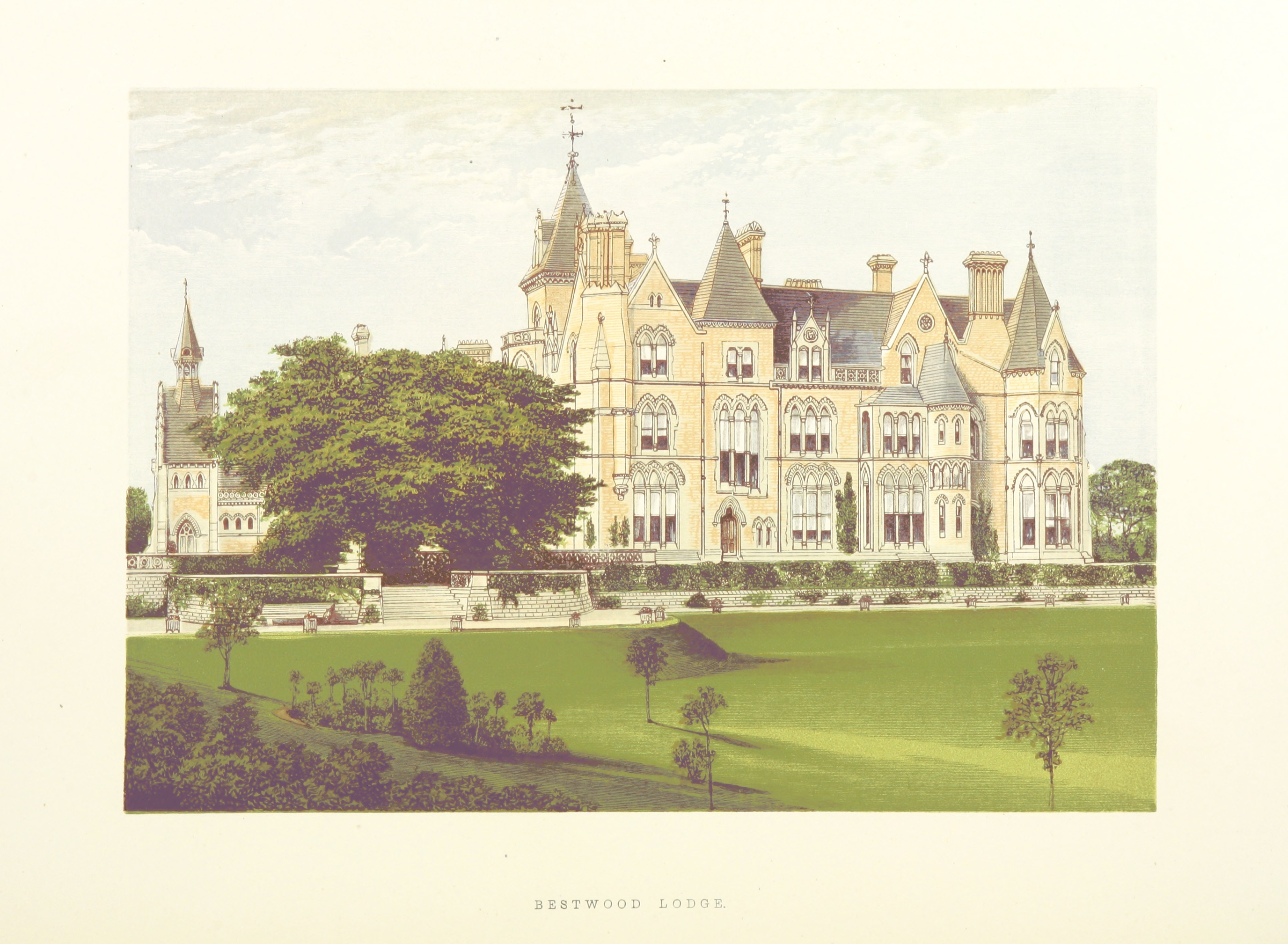
In The County Seats of the Noblemen and Gentlemen of Great Britain and Ireland by Francis Orpen Morris

The first written evidence of a royal hunting lodge at Bestwood, a part of the larger Sherwood Forest, is from 1286 in the reign of Edward I. In the 1360s, Edward III later expanded the lodge, adding a hall and two chambers. It was at Bestwood Lodge that he plotted to overthrow his mother Isabella of France and her lover Roger Mortimer. Richard III was the last regular royal occupant of the lodge, leaving from the lodge for Bosworth Field where he met his death in 1485.

The lodge and estate remained in royal hands, though often leased out, until the reign of Charles II. The King and his mistress, Nell Gwyn, would visit Bestwood Lodge and he leased the lodge to her in 1682. He later bequeathed it to Gwyn and their son Charles Beauclerk, Earl of Burford. Burford was created Duke of St Albans in 1684 and Bestwood Lodge passed down through his descendants.

The first generations of Dukes of St Albans resided elsewhere. In the 1700s, much of the surrounding land was enclosed into farms, with only a small portion of Bestwood Park remaining forested. The 10th Duke decided to seat his family at Bestwood and demolished the previous lodge. In 1862 he commissioned Samuel Sanders Teulon to rebuild the lodge in the Victorian Gothic Revival style. The new lodge was completed in 1865. Teulon also built nearby Emmanuel Church for the Duke in 1869.

The Duke entertained the Prince and Princess of Wales (later Edward VII and Queen Alexandra), Lord Tennyson, Benjamin Disraeli and William Gladstone at Bestwood Lodge. He constructed the Bestwood Pumping Station on the estate between 1871 and 1874 and the Bestwood Colliery in 1873. The lodge was altered in 1867, repaired after a fire in 1893, and further enlarged in 1896.

The 10th Duke was the only Duke of St Albans to reside at the lodge. After his death in 1898, it was leased to Sir Frank Bowden, 1st Baronet, in 1900. The northern boundary of Nottingham was extended outwards in 1933 close to the colliery and the forested edges of Bestwood Park, where it has remained since. The Beauclerk family finally sold the estate in 1939, with most of the southern farmland purchased by the Nottingham City Corporation for housing. The suburbs of Bestwood Estate, Bestwood Park, Top Valley and Rise Park were built from 1940 to the late 1970s on much of the land that comprised the estate. The lodge itself was requisitioned by the military in World War II for use as a training facility with shooting ranges, trenches and a control base for Northern Command.

Bestwood Lodge was designated a Grade II* listed building in 1972. In the mid-1970s, the lodge was converted into a Best Western hotel; it continues as such today. Though it was a ducal seat in Nottinghamshire, it is not considered part of The Dukeries.

== See also ==
- Grade II* listed buildings in Nottinghamshire

== Gallery ==
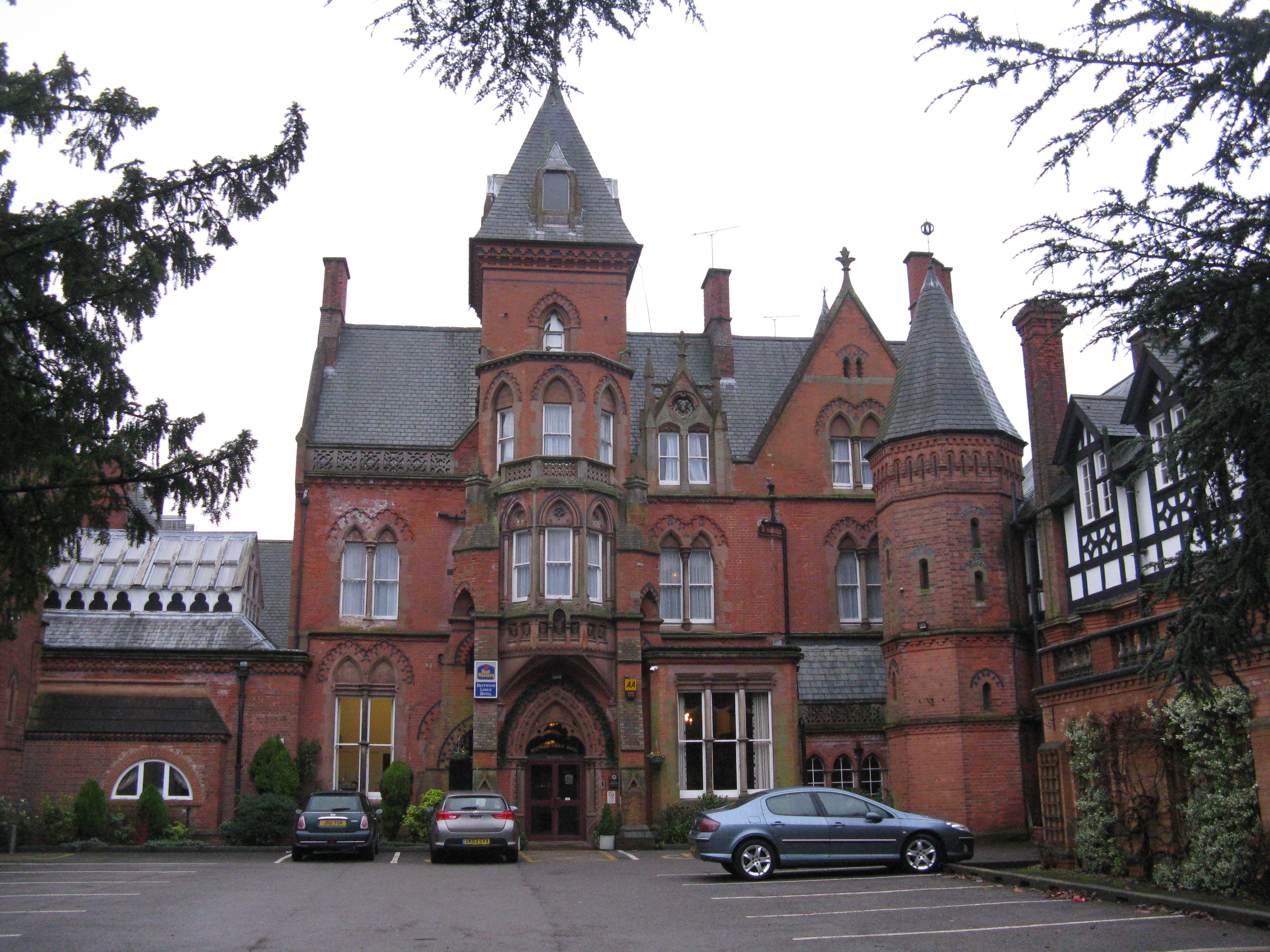
West façade

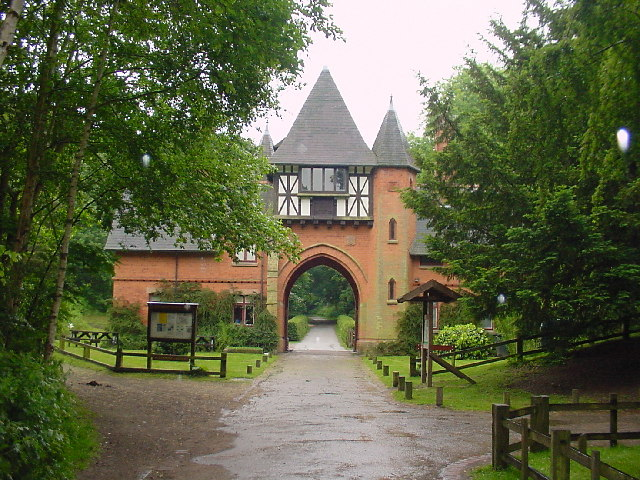
Alexandra Lodge which serves as the west gates

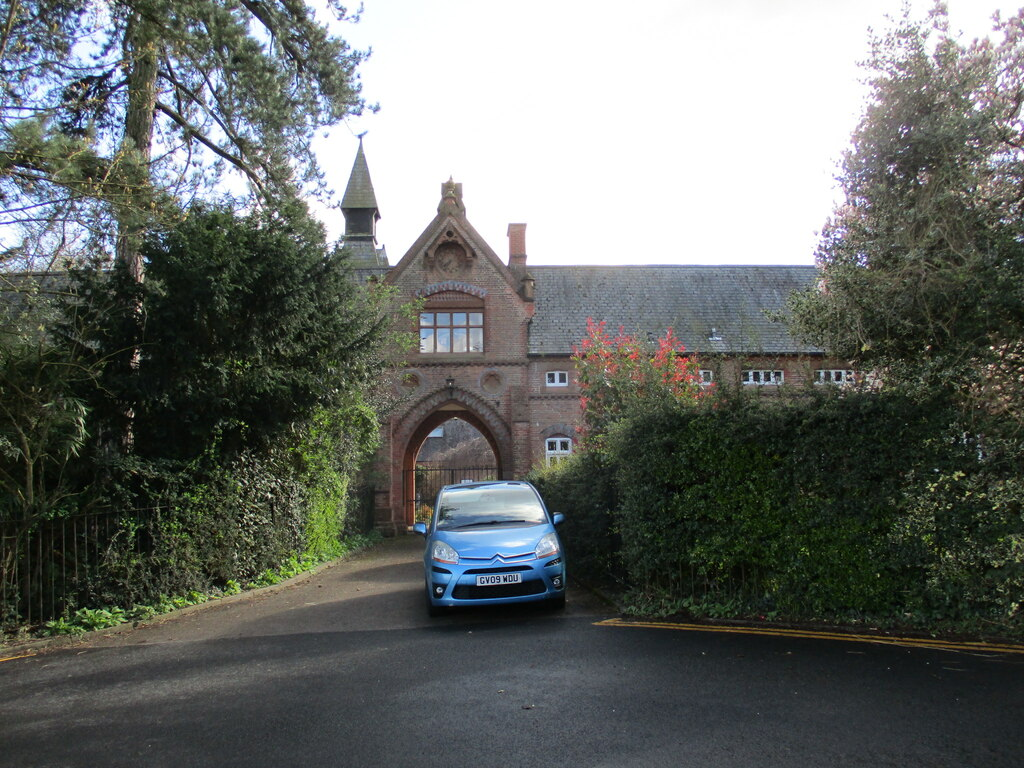
Stable court

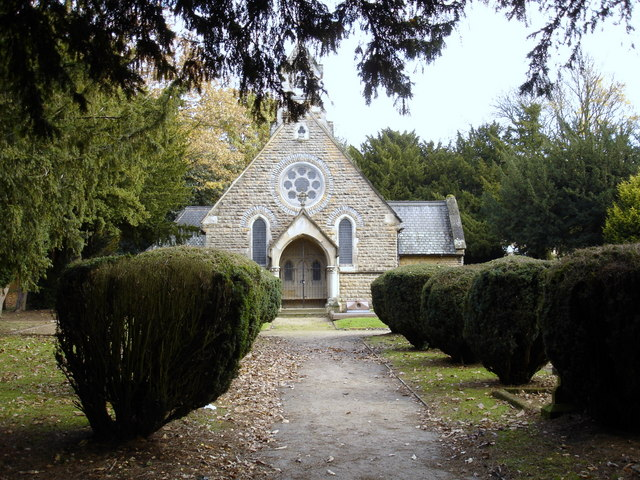
Emmanuel Church
