= Deer Park, Nottinghamshire =

Civil parish in Nottinghamshire, England

Coordinates: 53.011°N 1.151°W

Deer Park
- Civil parish
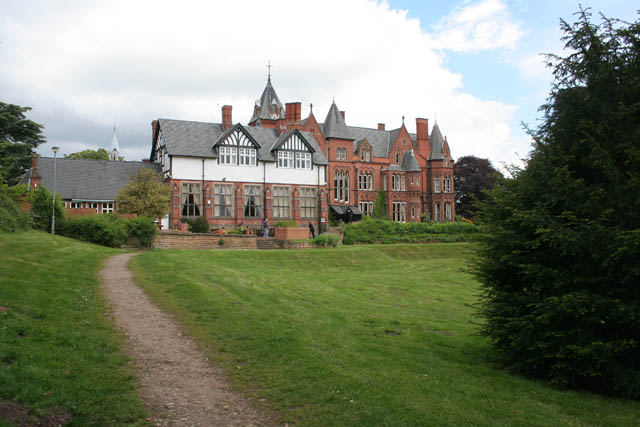
- Bestwood Lodge

- Location within Nottinghamshire
- Interactive map of Deer Park
- Created: 2026
- OS grid reference: SK 572465
  - London: 110 mi (180 km) SE
- District: Gedling
- Shire county: Nottinghamshire
- Region: East Midlands
- Country: England
- Sovereign state: United Kingdom
- Post town: NOTTINGHAM
- Postcode district: NG5
- Dialling code: 0115
- Police: Nottinghamshire
- Fire: Nottinghamshire
- Ambulance: East Midlands
- UK Parliament: Gedling

Deer Park is a settlement and civil parish in the Gedling district of Nottinghamshire, England. It was created on 1 April 2026 from the Bestwood Lodge and Deer Park area of the former parish of St Albans. The parish lies on the northern edge of the Greater Nottingham conurbation, adjacent to Bestwood Country Park.

== Geography ==
The parish covers the Bestwood Lodge hotel and the residential area of Deer Park around Deer Park Drive and Woodchurch Drive on the northern fringes of Nottingham. It contains the southern edge of Bestwood Country Park and the neighbouring parish of St Albans (the remaining part of the former larger parish) also lies to the west. The landscape mixes some modern housing with parkland and woodland associated with the historic Bestwood estate. The parish highest point of 125 metres (410 ft) at the top of the parish is near Violet Hill.

== History ==
The area formed part of the historic Bestwood Park Estate, which had associations with a former deer park and later connections to the Dukes of St Albans. In the modern period it developed as a residential neighbourhood including Bestwood Lodge and the Deer Park housing area, centred on Deer Park Drive and adjoining roads.

In June 2024 residents submitted a petition requesting a separate parish council for the Bestwood Lodge and Deer Park area. Gedling Borough Council undertook a Community Governance Review in 2024–2025. On 4 June 2025 the council resolved to abolish the existing St Albans parish and create two new parishes: Deer Park and a revised St Albans. The new arrangements took legal effect on 1 April 2026.

== Governance ==
Deer Park is administered by Deer Park Parish Council, which has five councillors. It forms part of Gedling Borough Council and Nottinghamshire County Council. The parliamentary constituency is Gedling.

== Demographics ==
Full 2021 census figures for the new parish boundaries are not separately published, as the parish did not exist at that date.

== Landmarks ==
- The parish lies on the fringes of Bestwood Country Park, a large public park on the site of the former Bestwood Park Estate.
- Bestwood Lodge, which is now a hotel.

=== Listed buildings ===
There are five listed buildings of architectural merit - Bestwood Lodge is at Grade II* designation, the remaining are related estate buildings - stables, bakery, garden walls and lodge.

== Sport ==
There is a playing field with football pitches, as well as tennis courts to the south of the parish.
