= Bestwood St. Albans =

Former civil parish in Nottinghamshire, England

Coordinates: 53.027°N 1.159°W

Bestwood St Albans
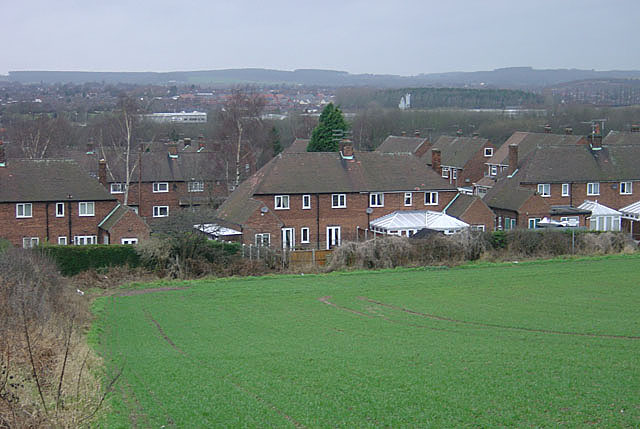

- Location within Nottinghamshire
- Population: 5,259 (2011)
- OS grid reference: SK5548
- Civil parish: Bestwood Village; St Albans
- District: Gedling
- Shire county: Nottinghamshire
- Region: East Midlands
- Country: England
- Sovereign state: United Kingdom
- Post town: NOTTINGHAM
- Postcode district: NG6
- Police: Nottinghamshire
- Fire: Nottinghamshire
- Ambulance: East Midlands
- UK Parliament: Sherwood

Bestwood St. Albans is a former civil parish in the Gedling borough of Nottinghamshire, England. According to the 2001 census it had a population of 4,950. At the time of the 2011 census the population had increased to 5,259. The parish included the Bestwood Village and Bestwood Lodge areas, as well as Warren Hill, Warren Wood, Deer Park and 'The Gardens' on the northern outskirts of the Greater Nottingham conurbation, but not the area of Nottingham itself known as Bestwood.

== History ==
The parish was formed as Bestwood Park on 25 March 1878 from part of Lenton, on 28 September 1977 the parish was renamed to "Bestwood St. Albans". On 1 April 2018 the parish was abolished and split to form Bestwood Village and St Albans.

== See also ==
- Listed buildings in Bestwood St. Albans
