= Warren Hill, Nottinghamshire =

Area of Arnold, Nottinghamshire, England

Coordinates: 53.013°N 1.162°W

Warren Hill
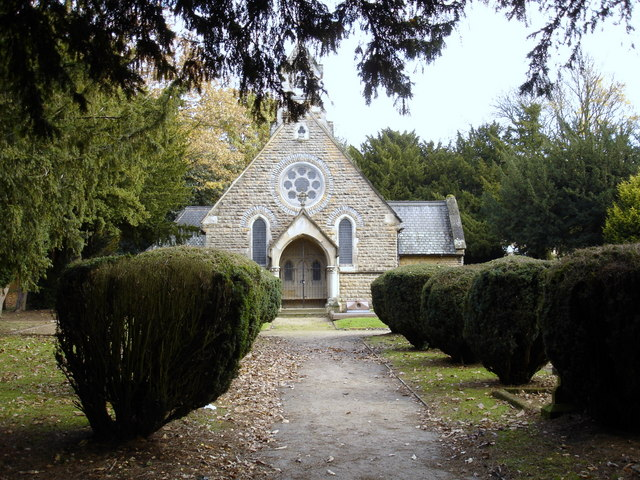
- Emmanuel Church in November 2008

- Location within Nottinghamshire
- OS grid reference: SK 56215 46550
- Civil parish: St. Albans
- District: Gedling
- Shire county: Nottinghamshire
- Region: East Midlands
- Country: England
- Sovereign state: United Kingdom
- Post town: NOTTINGHAM
- Postcode district: NG5
- Dialling code: 0115
- Police: Nottinghamshire
- Fire: Nottinghamshire
- Ambulance: East Midlands
- UK Parliament: Gedling

Warren Hill is an area within the market town of Arnold in the county of Nottinghamshire, England. Located in the civil parish of St. Albans, it is in the local government district of Gedling. The area is roughly 1.5 miles (2.4 km) from Arnold town centre and about 4 miles (6 km) from Nottingham. The surrounding areas include Top Valley to the south, Rise Park to the west, Arnold and the suburb of Redhill to the east and Bestwood Country Park and Bestwood Village to the north.

== Facilities ==
The area has a primary school as well as a secondary school; The Warren Academy and The Oakwood Academy. The area also has the Emmanuel Church (of the Church of England) located off Church View Close, as well as a community church located next to the Warren Academy off Muirfield Road. The community church may be scheduled to be demolished.

== Bus services ==
Bus services in Warren Hill, Nottinghamshire
| Bus operator | Line | Destination(s) | Notes |
|---|---|---|---|
| Nottingham City Transport | 79 | Nottingham → Alfreton Road → Nuthall Road → Cinderhill → Bulwell → Rise Park → Warren Hill → Bestwood Park → Arnold | |
| Nottingham City Transport | 88 | Nottingham → Nottingham College (Clarendon campus) → Sherwood → City Hospital → Edwards Lane → Bestwood Park → Top Valley → Warren Hill | |
| Nottingham City Transport | 89A | Nottingham → Nottingham College (Clarendon campus) → Sherwood → City Hospital → Edwards Lane → Bestwood Park → Warren Hill → Rise Park | |
