= Listed buildings in Bestwood St. Albans =

Bestwood St. Albans is a former civil parish in the Newark and Sherwood district of Nottinghamshire, England. The former parish contains 19 listed buildings that are recorded in the National Heritage List for England. Of these, four are at Grade II*, the middle of the three grades, and the others are at Grade II, the lowest grade. The former parish contains Bestwood Village and an area to the east. The listed buildings include a country house, later a hotel, and associated structures, smaller houses, a church and its lychgate, a water pumping station and associated structures, the winding house and headstocks of a former colliery, an office building, and a war memorial.

== Key ==
Grade	Criteria
II*	Particularly important buildings of more than special interest
II	Buildings of national importance and special interest

== Buildings ==
Name and location	Photograph	Date	Notes	Grade
The Old Lodge; 53.01053°N 1.14918°W		c. 1820	The gate lodge is in painted rendered brick on a deep plinth, with a hipped slate roof. There is a single storey and three bays. In the centre is a doorway with a plain surround, and the windows are iron-framed lattice casements.	II
Bestwood Lodge and wall 53.01297°N 1.15258°W		1862–65	A country house designed by S. S. Teulon, later extended, and subsequently converted into a hotel. It is in brick with polychrome decoration, dressings in stone and moulded brick, corbelled eaves, traceried balustrades, and slate roofs with coped gables and finials. There are three storeys and basements, and an irregular C-shaped plan, with a front of five bays. On the west front is a tower porch, a pointed doorway with a moulded surround, and an octagonal corner tower with a pyramidal roof. The windows are a mix of sashes and lancets, a Diocletian window, and gabled dormers. To the north is a chapel and a service range, with crow-stepped gables and a bell turret. On the south side is a later drill hall with a timber framed upper storey. In the garden is a stone terrace wall with double stairs flanked by brick curving walls.	II*
Bakery, Bestwood Lodge; 53.01327°N 1.15264°W	—	1862	The bakery, later converted into a house, was designed by S. S. Teulon. It is in brick with ornate brick dressings, a dentilled string course and eaves, and a slate roof. There are two storeys and an L-shaped plan, with three bays. The doorway has a pointed arch, and the windows are casements of various sizes.	II
Garden walls and gateway, Bestwood Lodge; 53.01571°N 1.15238°W	—	1862	The walls and gateway were designed by S. S. Teulon, and are in brick with stone dressings. The walls enclose a square area with sides of about 80 metres (260 ft). In the south wall is a gateway with a pointed arch, and a crowstepped gable with a finial. It contains wrought iron gates, and there are flanking piers with square finials.	II
Stable Court, Bestwood Lodge; 53.01376°N 1.15264°W		1862	The stable court was designed by S. S. Teulon, and has been converted into houses and garages. It is in polychrome brick on a chamfered plinth, with dressings in stone and brick, a dentilled string course, and slate roofs with coped gables and finials. There are two storeys and a square plan with a central courtyard and ranges of 13 by eight bays. On the north side is a gateway with a pointed arch, over which is an oriel window, and a clock with a gabled canopy. To its left is a two-storey square tower with a bell turret and a pyramidal roof. The ranges contain doorways, casement windows and gabled dormers.	II
Alexandra Lodge; 53.02153°N 1.15855°W		Early 1860s	The lodge to Bestwood Lodge is in Bestwood Country Park, and consists of an archway flanked by lodges. It was designed by S. S. Teulon in Gothic Revival style. The building is in red brick on a partial moulded plinth, with a floor band, dentilled eaves and slate roofs. In the centre is a pointed arch with a hood mould, to its left is a buttress, and to the right is a stair turret with a polygonal roof and a finial. Above the arch is a jettied timber framed storey containing an oriel window, over which is a pyramidal roof. The flanking lodges have two storeys and two bays each, they contain casement windows, and the left lodge has a gabled dormer.	II
Emmanuel Church; 53.01217°N 1.15737°W		1868	An estate church designed by S. S. Teulon, with a porch added in 1871. It is in stone with slate roofs, and consists of a nave and a chancel with an apse under a continuous roof, and west and south porches. At the west end, the porch is gabled and has a pointed entrance with a moulded surround flanked by shafts, above which is a wheel window, a trefoil, and a gabled bell turret. The other windows are lancets with chamfered surrounds and polychrome heads.	II*
Lychgate, Emmanuel Church; 53.01204°N 1.15798°W		1868	The lychgate at the entrance to the churchyard has stone walls, a timber superstructure, and a tile roof. There are two moulded posts, and double arch braces.	II
Bestwood Pumping Station; 53.02836°N 1.13766°W		1871–74	The water pumping station was designed for the Nottingham Water Company by Thomas Hawksley in Venetian Gothic Revival style, and has since been converted for other uses. The building is in polychromatic brick and sandstone on a plinth, with a moulded cornice, ornate iron roof railings and finials, and a hipped slate roof. There are two storeys and a basement, an engine house with sides of eight and five bays, a boiler house, a coal store, and a chimney disguised as a tower.	II*
Wall, piers and gate, Bestwood Pumping Station; 53.02881°N 1.13726°W		1871	At the west entrance to the ground are four square stone piers on chamfered plinths, with foliate capitals and pyramidal caps. Between them are scrolled cast iron gates and wickets. There are two similar piers at the east entrance, and a cast iron gate. The curved boundary walls are in stone with stepped gabled coping.	II
Cooling pond and lamps, Bestwood Pumping Station; 53.02812°N 1.13727°W		1871	The serpentine cooling pond has stone sides with chamfered coping, and is about 150 metres (490 ft) long and 50 metres (160 ft) wide. At the west end are two cast iron gas lamps with broached square bases, tapered octagonal stems, foliate ornament, and glass globes with porcelain finials.	II
East Lodge, Bestwood Pumping Station; 53.02742°N 1.13651°W		1871	The lodge is in brick on a chamfered plinth, with stone dressings, a dentilled cornice and eaves, and a slate roof with coped gables and iron finials. There are two storeys, and an L-shaped plan with three bays. On the west front is a wing with a hipped square bay window, and in the angle is a round-headed doorway with a fanlight and a hipped hood on curved brackets. At the north end is a bay window with a parapet, and the windows are lancets with round and pointed polychrome heads.	II
Lamp west of East Lodge, Bestwood Pumping Station; 53.02751°N 1.13658°W	—	1871	The gas lamp is in cast iron, and has a broached square base, a tapered octagonal stem, foliate ornament, and a glass globe.	II
Lamp north of boiler house, Bestwood Pumping Station; 53.02832°N 1.13741°W	—	1871	The gas lamp is in cast iron, and has a broached square base, a tapered octagonal stem, and foliate ornament.	II
Lamp east of West Lodge, Bestwood Pumping Station; 53.02875°N 1.13750°W	—	1871	The gas lamp is in cast iron, and has a broached square base, a tapered octagonal stem, foliate ornament, a glass globe, and a porcelain finial.	II
West Lodge, Bestwood Pumping Station; 53.02890°N 1.13748°W	—	1871	The lodge is in brick on a chamfered plinth, with stone dressings, a dentilled cornice and eaves, and a slate roof with coped gables and iron finials. There are two storeys, and an L-shaped plan with three bays. On the east front is a wing with a hipped square bay window, and in the angle is a round-headed doorway with a fanlight and a hipped hood on curved brackets. At the north end is a bay window with a parapet, and the windows are lancets with round and pointed polychrome heads.	II
Winding house and headstocks, Bestwood Colliery; 53.02162°N 1.17201°W		1873	The house for the winding engine has a concrete engine bed and plinth, and the rest of the building is in brick with stone dressings, moulded string courses and cornices, and a hipped slate roof. There are three storeys and a square plan with three bays, and a service wing to the east with two and three storeys and a parapet. The ground floor is in rusticated stone, and contains flat-headed windows. The middle floor has quoins, and contains two-light windows with round heads and rusticated voussoirs, and in the top floor are two-light mullioned windows. The engine house is joined to the headstocks, which has concrete posts, iron lattice stays, pulleys and cage guides.	II*
The Clock Tower; 53.02285°N 1.17901°W		1873–76	An office building for the Bestwood Coal and Iron Company designed by Thomas Worthington in Gothic Revival style. It is in red brick with bands and dressings in stone, and a slate roof with scalloped terracotta ridge tiles. There are two storeys, a rectangular main range with wings to the north and west, and a clock tower. The entrance is through a gabled two-storey porch that has a four-centred arched opening and a doorway with a fanlight, and the windows are sashes. The tower is square with four stages, clock faces on the north and south sides, and paired arch openings in the top stage, over which are dentilled eaves and a pyramidal roof. On the north side of the tower is a niche containing a shield with initials.	II
War memorial 53.02309°N 1.17884°W		c. 1920	The war memorial is in a railed enclosed by a road junction, and is in Portland stone. It consists of a bronze cross on a Roman Doric column with a moulded capital. The column stands on a cruciform concave-sided moulded base on a round moulded plinth of three steps. On the column is a bronze tablet, and on the base are inscribed panels.	II
