= Park Vale Academy =

Location
- Top Valley Drive; Top Valley; Nottingham, Nottinghamshire, NG8 4HY; England
- Coordinates: 53.0088°N 1.1772°W

Information
- Type: Academy
- Trust: Redhill Academy Trust UID= 4338
- Department for Education URN: 144487 Tables
- Ofsted: Reports
- Principal: Steve Bowhay
- Gender: Mixed
- Age: 11 to 16
- Enrolment: 793 as of March 2020
- Capacity: 950
- Houses: Rufford, Wollaton, Clumber, Newstead
- Website: www.parkvaleacademy.org.uk

Park Vale Academy (formerly Top Valley School and Top Valley Academy) is a mixed secondary school located in the Top Valley area of Nottingham in the English county of Nottinghamshire.

== History and governance ==
Previously a community school administered by Nottingham City Council, Top Valley School converted to academy status on 1 September 2012 and was renamed Park Vale Academy. The school is sponsored by Central College Nottingham; It continued to coordinate with Nottingham City Council for admissions.

The school benefitted from an £18m rebuild in 2017.

== Pastoral ==
The school runs vertical tutor groups, overseen by a head of house, (a senior position) and a house achievement co-ordinator. There are 36 tutor groups. In each tutor group there are approximately 5 students from each year group. The houses are named after local monuments Clumber, Newstead, Rufford, Wollaton.

== Academics ==
This is an 11 to 16 academy with no sixth form. At the end of Key Stage 4, year 11 students automatically transfer the Redhill Sixth Form Academy.

=== Key Stage 3 ===
All students study: Mathematics, English, Science, Spanish, Geography, History, Computing, Design & Technology, Food Technology, Art, Drama, Music, Physical Education, PSHE, and Religious Education. In Year 8, some students also study French.

=== Key Stage 4 ===
This is started in year 9. All students must study English, English Literature, Mathematics, Science, Physical Education which is not examined), PSHE, Religious Education, and at least one otherl EBacc subject. The choose one options from a list of GCSE and BTEC courses- triple sciences, French and Spanish are all available as is an examined PE course.

=== Ofsted ===
In May and June 2019 Ofsted inspectors called and found, like its predecessor the management and leadership of the school was inadequate. They found they were tardy in addressing weaknesses and failed to evaluate any improvement scheme they introduced. They found that special needs teaching was weak as was mathematics and felt that work was pitched at too lower level of difficulty, as some teachers had low expectations of pupils. In all other areas strategies were found to be ineffective. The governors did not hold leaders to account for low standards as they lacked the necessary knowledge and skills to carry out their delegated duties.

A monitoring visit was made in February 2020, where inspectors found the leaders and managers are taking effective actions facilitating the removal of the serious weaknesses designation. They found both the schools and the trusts improvement plans are fit for purpose.
