= Nottingham North and Kimberley =

UK Parliament constituency (since 2024)

Coordinates: 52.99°N 1.21°W

- County constituency for the House of Commons
- Interactive map of boundaries from 2024
- Location within the East Midlands
- County: Nottinghamshire
- Electorate: 73,768 (2024)
- Major settlements: Bulwell, Kimberley

Current constituency
- Created: 2024
- Member of Parliament: Alex Norris (Labour)
- Seats: One
- Created from: Nottingham North

Nottingham North and Kimberley is a constituency of the House of Commons in the UK Parliament. It was first contested at the 2024 general election, since when it has been held by Alex Norris of the Labour and Co-operative Party. He was previously the MP for the predecessor constituency of Nottingham North from 2017 to 2024. He has served as Lord Chancellor and Justice Secretary since 2026.

== Constituency profile ==
Nottingham North and Kimberley is a constituency in Nottinghamshire in the East Midlands of England. It covers the northern neighbourhoods of the city of Nottingham (Whitemoor, Aspley, Broxtowe, Basford, Bulwell, Bestwood Park, Top Valley and Rise Park) and the outlying town of Kimberley in the Borough of Broxtowe.

Nottingham is a historic city of medieval origin. During the industrial era, the manufacturing of bicycles and textiles, particularly lace, were significant industries in the city. Today, Nottingham is a major centre for sports and is recognised as a City of Literature by UNESCO. This constituency contains a number of large council estates (Aspley, Broxtowe and Bestwood) which were developed in the interwar period. Bulwell and Kimberley are historic market towns where coal mining was traditionally an important industry. Most of the constituency is highly-deprived, especially in the council estates and in Bulwell, whilst Kimberley has average levels of wealth. House prices across the constituency are generally lower than the rest of the East Midlands and around half the UK average.

Nottingham North and Kimberley has a similar age profile to the rest of the country, although with a below-average retired population. Residents have low rates of income and homeownership and the child poverty rate is high. Education levels are low and a high proportion of residents work in the health and construction sectors. The percentage claiming unemployment benefits is high. White people made up 73% of the population in the 2021 census. Asians and Black people were 10% each, with the Asian population concentrated around Whitemoor where they made up almost half the population.

At the local council level, the Nottingham neighbourhoods are represented entirely by Labour Party councillors. Kimberley voted for Labour representatives at the district council level but elected Reform UK councillors at the county council, which held elections in 2025. Voters in Nottingham North and Kimberley strongly supported leaving the European Union in the 2016 referendum; an estimated 62% voted in favour of Brexit compared to the UK-wide figure of 52%.

== Boundaries ==
Further to the 2023 review of Westminster constituencies, which came into effect for the 2024 general election, the composition of the constituency is as follows (as they existed on 1 December 2020):

- The Borough of Broxtowe wards of: Kimberley; Nuthall East & Strelley; Watnall & Nuthall West.
- The City of Nottingham wards of: Aspley; Basford; Bestwood; Bulwell; Bulwell Forest; Leen Valley.

It includes the following areas:

- The former Nottingham North constituency, excluding the Bilborough ward (now included in Nottingham South)
- The Leen Valley ward, transferred from Nottingham South
- The communities of Kimberley and Nuthall, previously part of the Broxtowe constituency.

== Members of Parliament ==
Nottingham North prior to 2024

Election	Member	Party
2024	Alex Norris	Labour Co-op

== Elections ==
=== Elections in the 2020s ===
General election 2024: Nottingham North and Kimberley
Party	Candidate	Votes	%	±%
Labour Co-op	Alex Norris	16,480	47.1	+1.1
Reform	Golam Kadiri	7,053	20.1	+14.5
Conservative	Caroline Henry	6,787	19.4	−20.8
Green	Samuel Harvey	3,351	9.6	+7.1
Liberal Democrats	David Schmitz	1,336	3.8	±0.0
Majority		9,427	26.9	+21.1
Turnout		35,007	47.5	−10.3
Registered electors		73,768		
Labour win (new seat)				

== See also ==
- parliamentary constituencies in Nottinghamshire
