= Bestwood Village =

Village and civil parish in Nottinghamshire, England

Coordinates: 53.025°N 1.176°W

- Village and civil parish
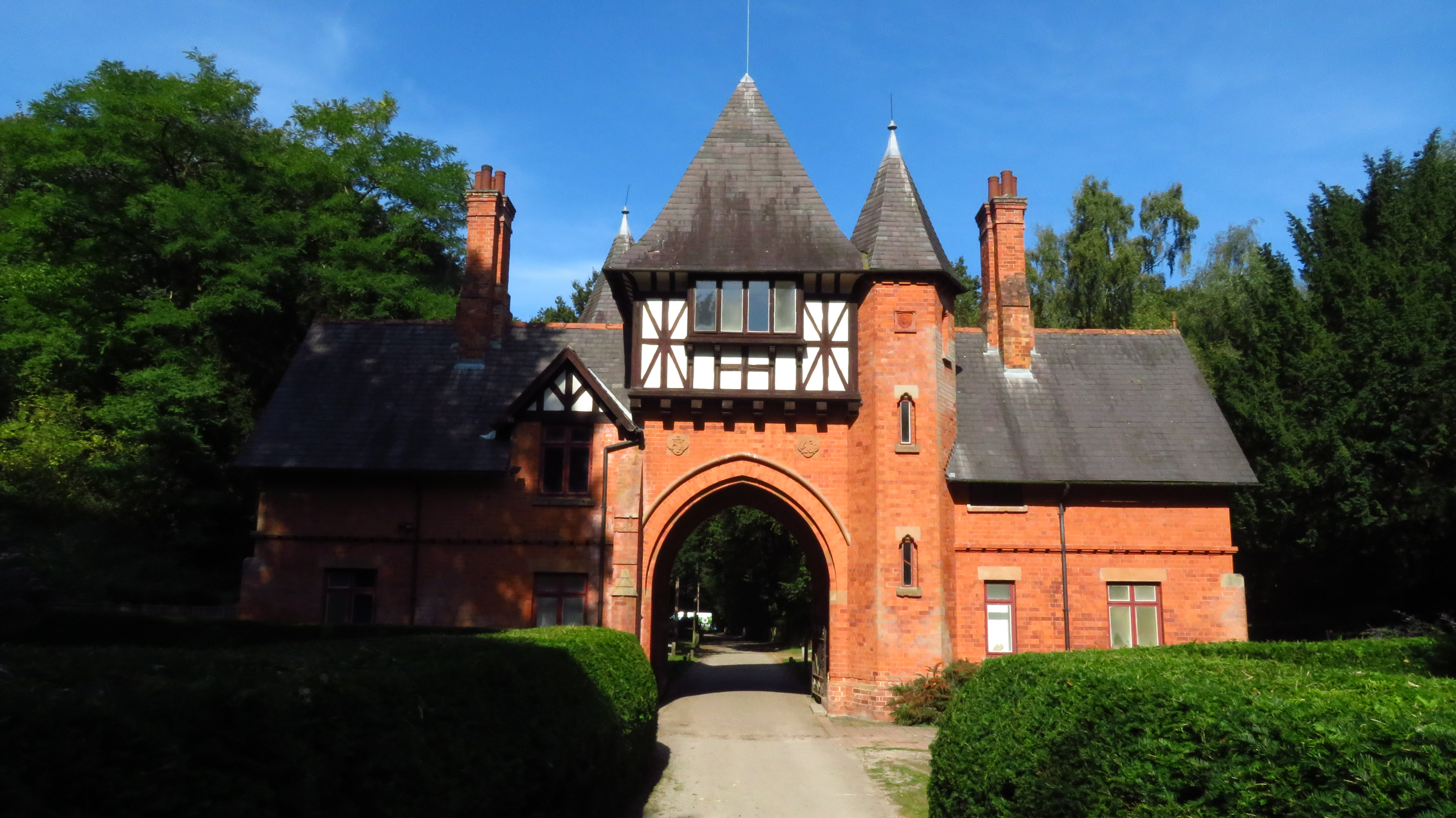
- Alexandra Lodges, Bestwood Country Park

- Location within Nottinghamshire
- Interactive map of Bestwood Village
- Area: 3.51 sq mi (9.1 km^{2})
- Population: 2,223 (2021)
  - Density: 633/sq mi (244/km^{2})
- OS grid reference: SK 55261 47874
  - London: 110 mi (180 km) SSE
- District: Borough of Gedling (partly Ashfield)
- Shire county: Nottinghamshire
- Region: East Midlands
- Country: England
- Sovereign state: United Kingdom
- Post town: NOTTINGHAM
- Postcode district: NG6
- Dialling code: 0115
- Police: Nottinghamshire
- Fire: Nottinghamshire
- Ambulance: East Midlands
- UK Parliament: Gedling and Sherwood
- Website: Parish council website

Bestwood Village is a village and civil parish in the Gedling district of Nottinghamshire. It is to the east of Hucknall and north of Bulwell. It is neighboured to the north by the village of Papplewick. It is also close to the Bestwood Park Estate which is in the City of Nottingham.

Until 1 April 2018 it was part of the civil parish of Bestwood St. Albans. The population count was 2,223 at the 2021 census. A small part of the village falls within the Ashfield district council area. There have been several new housing estates built recently including the redevelopment of the former Bayles and Whylie factory site which was a former glue mill.

== History ==
Before the industrial revolution, Bestwood was a small hamlet sustained by agriculture and framework knitting. Bestwood Village was greatly expanded when its coal mine was sunk in 1875 by the Lancaster family. Their Bestwood Coal and Iron Company (BC&IC) also opened an ironworks next to the colliery in 1881 with two blast furnaces and two more were added in 1890. It remained in operation until 1928. The coalmine was one of the most successful mines in the Nottinghamshire coalfield and at its peak employed 2000 men. It closed in 1967. The terraces on Park Road, St. Albans Road and The Square were built by the Bestwood Coal and Iron Company to house its workforce and it is now a conservation area. The company built its offices (with its distinctive clock tower) on Park Road.

The surviving headstock and winding house of Bestwood Colliery in the Nottinghamshire Coalfield, with its vertical steam engine of 1873, has been preserved to commemorate Bestwood's industrial heritage. It stands at the entrance to the park and is now a listed building. The historic Winding Engine House off Park Road offers free tours between 10 am and 12-noon on Saturdays and Bank Holidays or for groups at other times by special arrangement. The community-run Dynamo House Cafe adjacent to the Winding House is open the same hours.

== Amenities ==
Bestwood Country Park is an area of heath, grassland, wetland and formal garden which can be accessed from the village. The volunteer group "The Friends of Bestwood Country Park" are involved in improving the park and its wildlife and habitats.

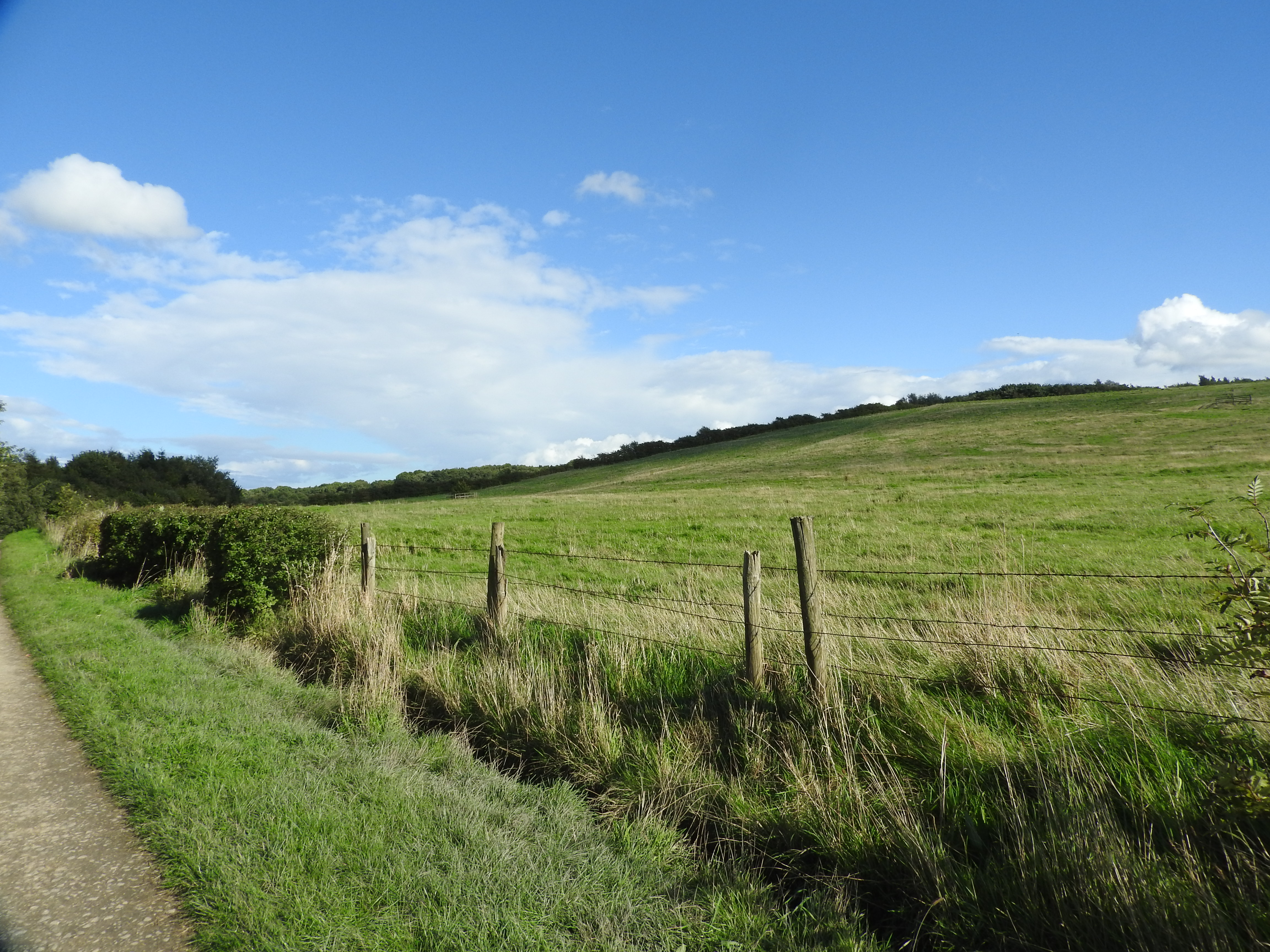
Bestwood Country Park

Bestwood Lodge was built in the Gothic style for the 10th Duke of St Albans in 1862–65 by the architect Samuel Sanders Teulon. The current Bestwood Lodge was completed in 1885. Albert Edward, Prince of Wales, often visited incognito to spend a quiet time with his friends, and many old residents remember seeing him walking up from the station by himself. In 1878 he visited with Princess Alexandra for the opening of the Nottingham Castle Museum and both planted a tree at Bestwood. Many signatures were written in the visitor's book, including Disraeli, Gladstone, and Tennyson.

In the last century, Sir Frank Bowden, head of Raleigh, bought Bestwood Lodge and later it became the headquarters for the Army during World War II. It remained Ministry of Defence property until the mid-1970s when it was converted into The Bestwood Lodge Hotel.

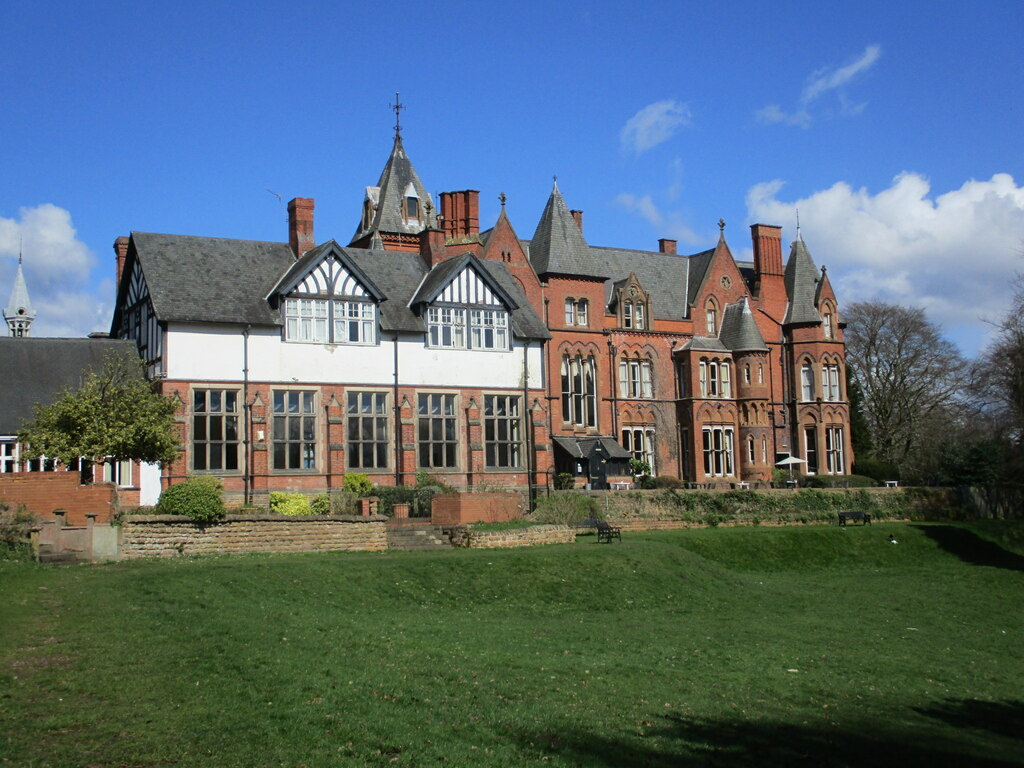
Bestwood Lodge

Bestwood Pumping Station, 2 miles north west of the village, was built in 1871–4.

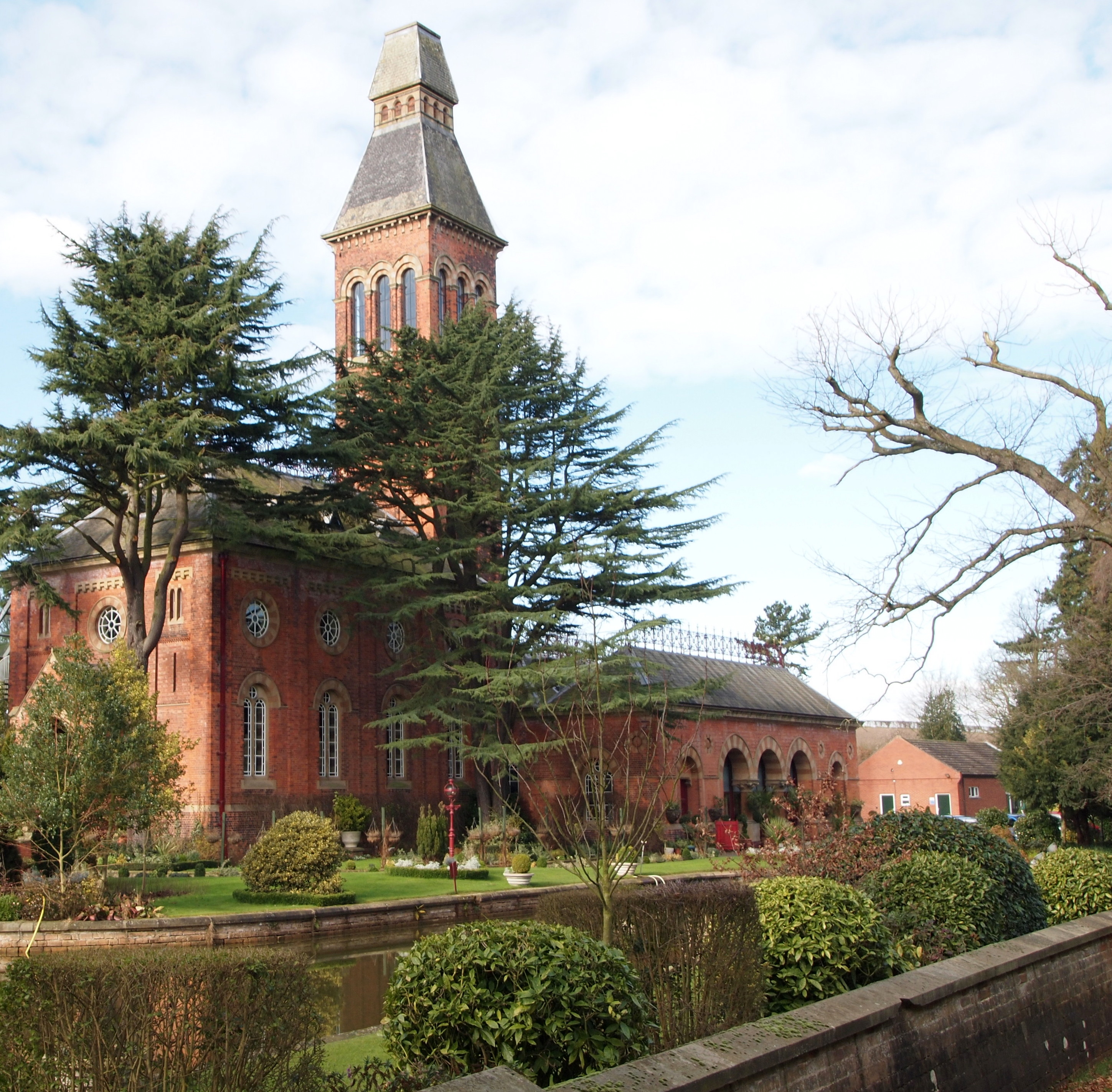
Bestwood Pumping Station

Bestwood Village has an active Women's Institute and is home to the Bestwood Male Voice Choir. The Bestwood Welfare Black Diamonds Brass Band has been running since 1947.

Bestwood is part of Nottinghamshire's Hidden Valleys area. Bestwood Village parkrun began in 2017. It is an all-inclusive 5 km event in Bestwood Country Park: every Saturday morning at 9 am, runners, joggers and walkers start from by the Country Park Dynamo House NG6 8UE. The event has been supported financially by Gedling Borough Council, and local firms and individuals. The course is described as "undulating".

== Bus services ==
Bus services in Bestwood Village, Nottinghamshire
Bus operator	Line	Destination(s)	Notes
Stagecoach Mansfield	141	Nottingham → Bestwood Village → Hucknall → Blidworth → Mansfield → Sutton	
Nottsbus Connect	528	Selston → Underwood → Moorgreen → Watnall → Nuthall → Phoenix Park → Bulwell → Bestwood Village	

== See also ==
- Listed buildings in Bestwood St. Albans
