= Bestwood Pumping Station =

Former water pumping station in Nottinghamshire, England

Coordinates: 53.02831°N 1.13764°W

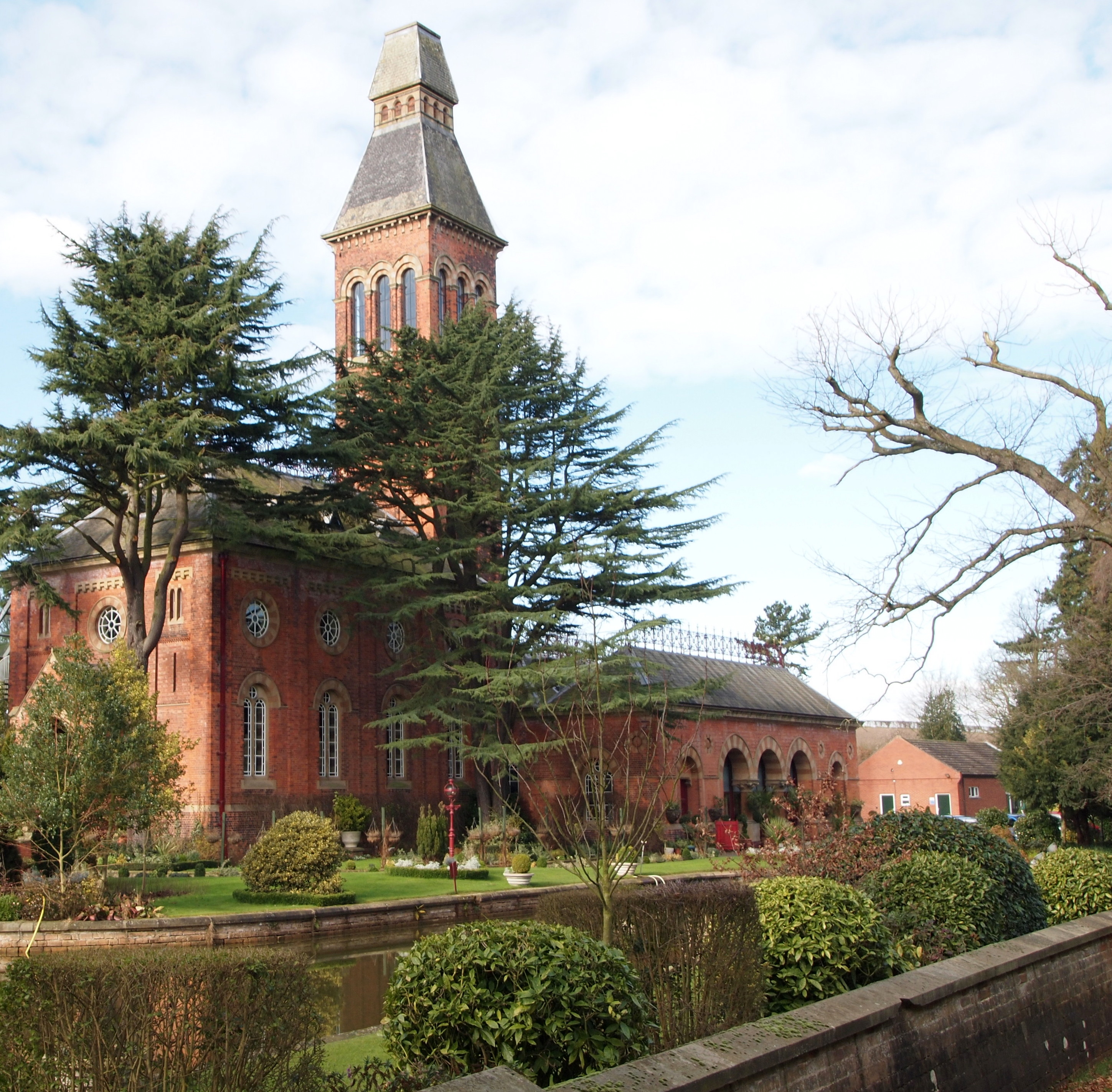
- Pumping Station from the lake.

- Location in Nottinghamshire

General information
- Architectural style: Venetian Gothic
- Location: St Albans, Nottinghamshire, England
- Year built: 1871–74
- Client: Nottingham Water Company

Design and construction
- Architect: Thomas Hawksley

Listed Building – Grade II*
- Official name: Bestwood Pumping Station
- Designated: 5 September 1972
- Reference no.: 1265233

Bestwood Pumping Station was a water pumping station operating in St Albans, Nottinghamshire, England, from 1874 until 1964. It was subsequently repurposed for various hospitality uses.

== History ==
Bestwood Pumping Station was built between 1871 and 1874 on land belonging to William Beauclerk, 10th Duke of St Albans. It was commissioned by the Nottingham Water Company and designed by Thomas Hawksley in the Venetian Gothic style, reflecting the social importance of water supply infrastructure in the 19th century.

The 172 feet (52 m) tall chimney is concealed and disguised as a huge campanile topped by a cupola.

It was equipped with two 125 hp rotative beam engines built by Joseph Whitham and Son, Leeds. The pumping station yielded more than 3.5 million imperial gallons (16,000 m^{3}) per day from the pebble beds. It pumped water through two 18-inch (46 cm) mains to Red Hill reservoir and one 18-inch main to the Papplewick reservoir.

It operated until 1964 when a new electric pump house was built. The steam engines were removed between 1968 and 1972.

Bestwood Pumping Station was designated a Grade II* listed building in 1972. Several of the structures on site are also separately listed including the lodges, landscaped ornamental cooling pond, several cast iron lamps and the boundary wall and gate.

== Later use ==
The Venetian Gothic Revival style building can be seen from the main A60 road. Its tower makes the building a local landmark.

From 1982 until 2017, the building housed the Lakeside Tower Restaurant and Spa. The site was left vacant until it was acquired in 2019 for £1.5 million. Substantial investment went into its redevelopment, most recently branded as 'Lakeside'. The building operated as a wedding venue and restaurant until it closed in 2023.

== See also ==
- Grade II* listed buildings in Nottinghamshire
- Listed buildings in Bestwood St. Albans
- Papplewick Pumping Station
- Boughton Pumping Station
