= Bestwood Country Park =

Country park in Nottinghamshire

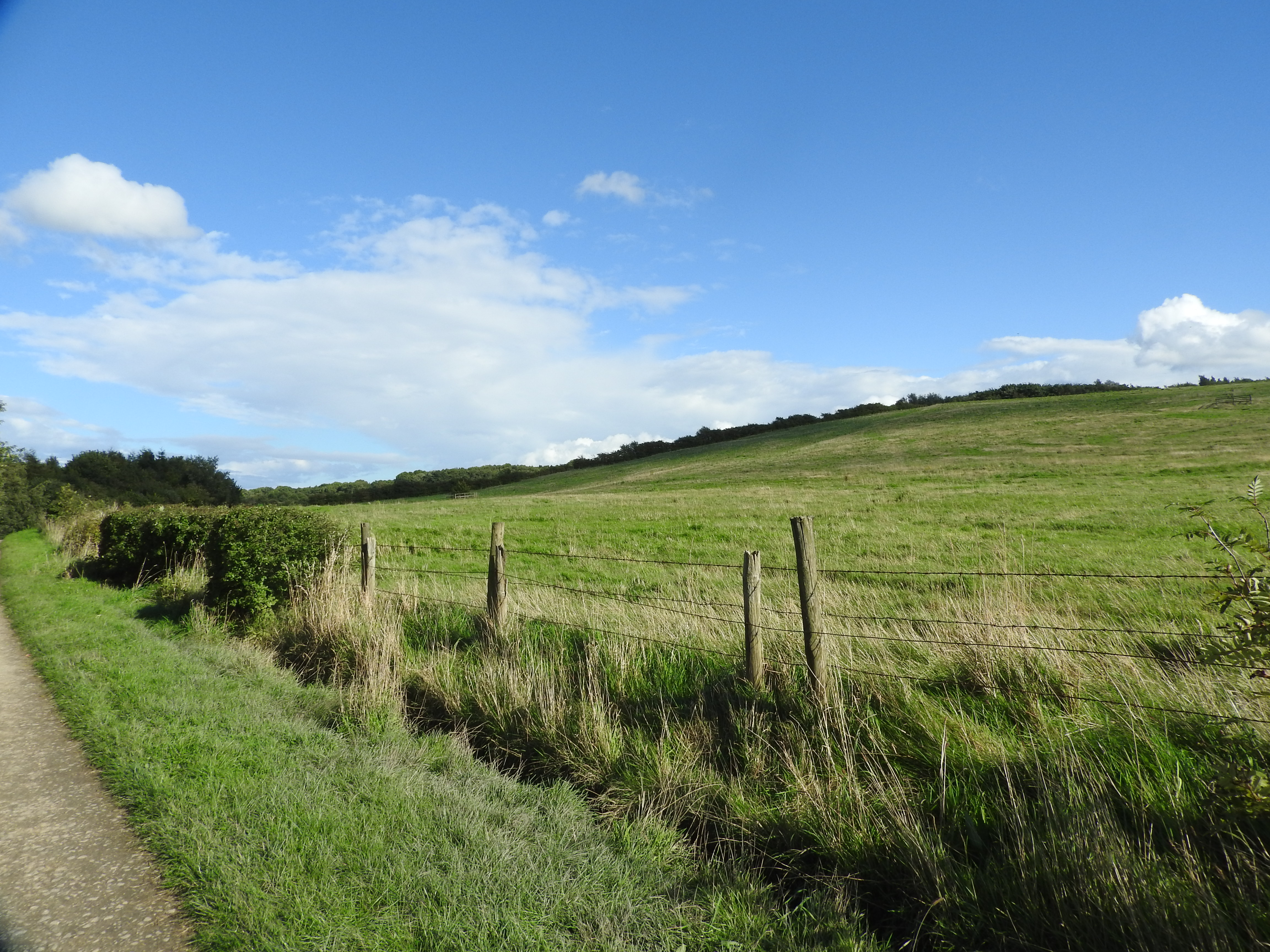
- Interactive map of Bestwood Country Park
- Type: Country park
- Location: Bestwood Village, Nottinghamshire, England
- Coordinates: 53°01′18″N 01°10′20″W
- Area: 650 acres (2.6 km^{2})
- Operator: Gedling Borough Council
- Visitors: 400,000 (annually)
- Open: All year
- Website: https://www.gedling.gov.uk/leisure-culture-and-parks/parks-and-green-spaces/bestwood-country-park

Bestwood Country Park is a country park near Bestwood Village, Nottinghamshire, England. Bestwood was a hunting estate owned by the Crown from the medieval period until the 17th century, when King Charles II gave it to his mistress, Nell Gwyn, and their son. In the Victorian era, Bestwood was the location of a coal mine which closed in 1967. It was established as a country park in 1973.

== History ==
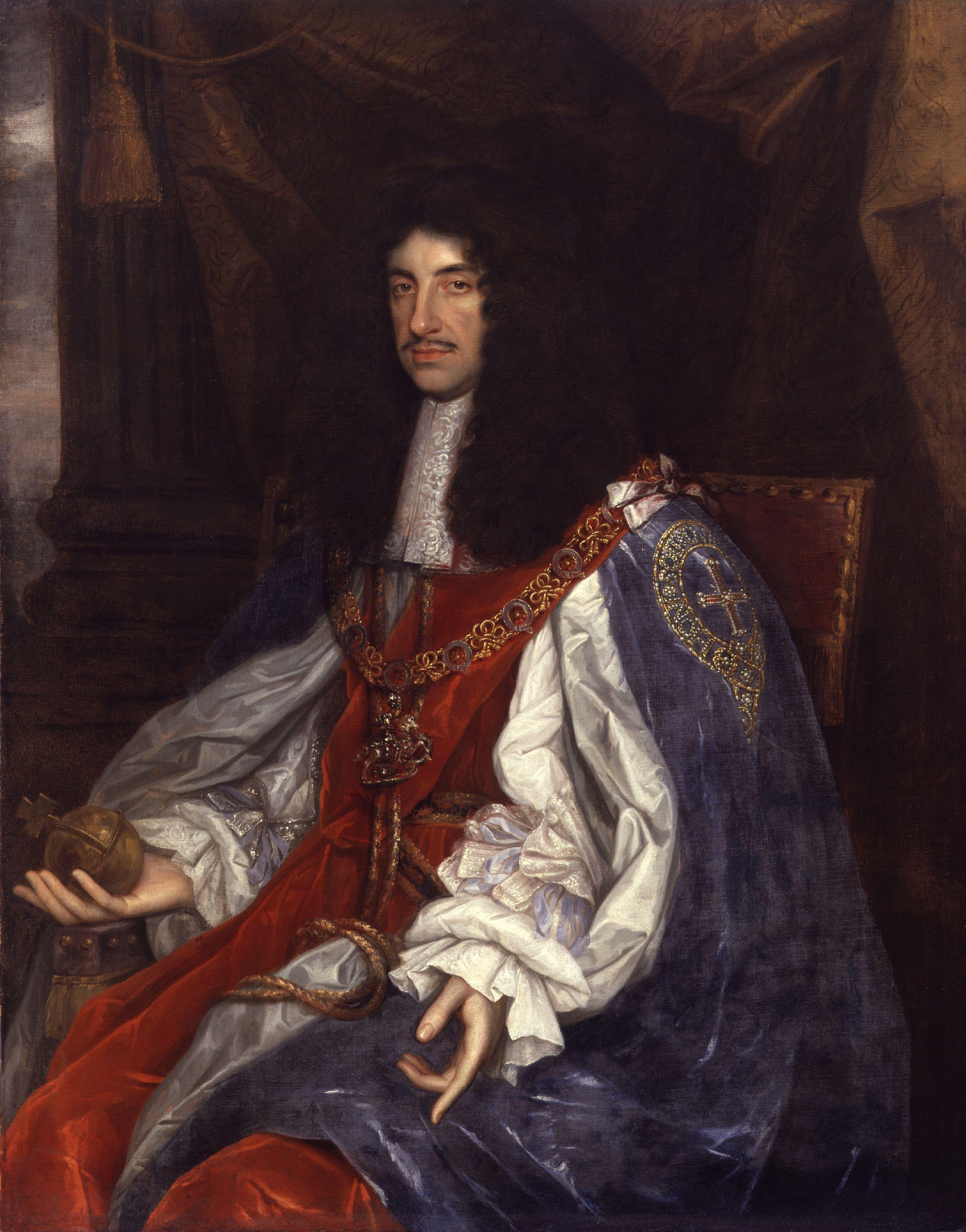
Charles II, portrait by John Michael Wright

In the Middle Ages, Bestwood Country Park was a hunting estate in Sherwood Forest owned by the Crown, and used by the landed gentry and monarchs visiting Nottingham. In the 17th century, King Charles II was known to visit the park with his mistress, Nell Gwyn. He set the boundaries to the park and granted it to Gwyn and their illegitimate son Charles Beauclerk, the 1st Duke of St Albans. Thereafter, land was sold in parcels and in the early 19th century there were thirteen farms in the park. In the Victorian era, owner William Beauclerk made a significant impact on the park when he established the Bestwood Coal and Iron Company to mine coal at Bestwood colliery. The mine became the world's first to produce one million tonnes of coal in a single year. He also demolished the original medieval hunting lodge and had designer Samuel Sanders Teulon build a new lodge. The mine was closed in 1967, and the country park was established in 1973.

=== Nell Gwyn ===
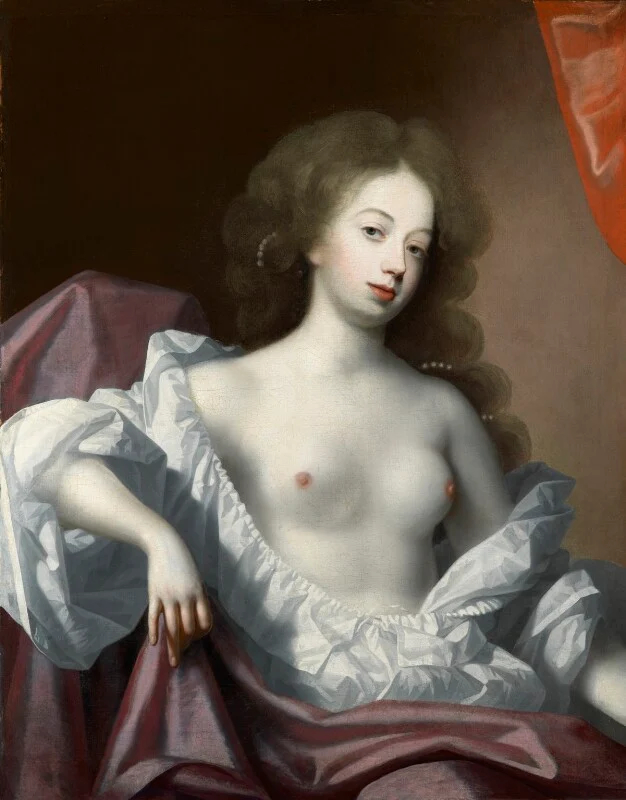
Nell Gwyn, portrait by Simon Verelst

King Charles II gave Bestwood Park to his mistress Nell Gwyn and their son. While staying at the hunting lodge, the King and his guests would tease Gwyn for sleeping late and for not taking part in the hunting. The King was reported to have offered to give Gwyn "all the land she could ride around before breakfast." The next day, he found her already sitting for breakfast. She had reportedly "ridden out early, dropping handkerchiefs along her route, and the encircled area became Bestwood Park".

=== Winding engine house ===
The winding engine house of Bestwood Colliery in the Nottinghamshire coalfield with its vertical steam engine of 1873 has been preserved to commemorate Bestwood's industrial heritage. The engine would lower miners into the mine shaft and winch coal back up. It stands at the entrance to the park and is now a listed building. The winding engine was restored with funding from the Heritage Lottery Fund and the council.

== Facilities ==
There are wildflower meadows and forest trails through ancient oak woodland, cycling paths, bird-watching, horse riding, lakes and a cafe. The area is 650 acres (2.6 km^{2}) in size, and averaged 400,000 visitors in 2009.

== See also ==
- Listed buildings in Bestwood St. Albans
