= Bestwood Estate =

Council estate in Nottingham, England

Coordinates: 52.995°N 1.169°W

Bestwood
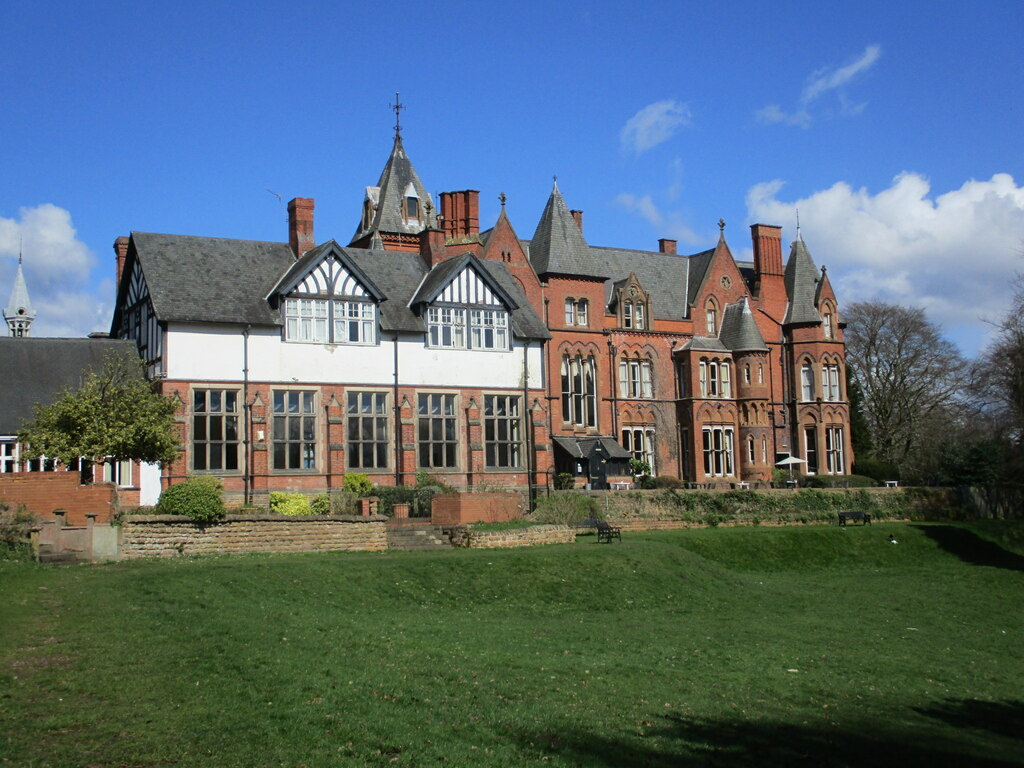
- Bestwood Lodge, Bestwood Estate

- Location within Nottinghamshire
- Population: 4,719
- OS grid reference: SK 55635 44541
- Unitary authority: Nottingham
- Ceremonial county: Nottinghamshire
- Region: East Midlands
- Country: England
- Sovereign state: United Kingdom
- Post town: NOTTINGHAM
- Postcode district: NG5
- Dialling code: 0115
- Police: Nottinghamshire
- Fire: Nottinghamshire
- Ambulance: East Midlands
- UK Parliament: Nottingham North and Kimberley

Bestwood Estate is a large council estate located in the north of Nottingham, England. Based on the 2011 census, its population is 4,719. There is also a ward of the City of Nottingham called Bestwood, which at the time of the 2011 census had a population of 16,753.

== Origins and early years ==
Construction was commenced in the 1930s and by 1938 some of the roads had been established including Andover Road, Gainsford Crescent and Landcroft Crescent. Work was interrupted by World War II, after which the bulk of the housing stock was constructed. Most of the houses are constructed with similar layouts. They are generally semi-detached buildings or town houses. The first decades saw a generally working class population in residence.

== 1980s–1990s ==
Under Margaret Thatcher's Right to Buy policy, a modest proportion of council tenants chose to purchase their rented property at hugely discounted prices. The majority of the housing stock remained in council ownership. The demographic of the inhabitants noticeably altered since the estate's early years. The estate increasingly housed young families with high levels of unemployment.

== Early 2000's ==
The decline of Bestwood Estate continued, with increasing crime levels. Policing the area became difficult as a small number of local families established a grip on it. Most prominent amongst these was the extended Gunn family. Supported by the proceeds of crime and drug-dealing, the Gunns gained notoriety for their ruthlessness. A number of highly publicised murders eventually led to the arrest and imprisonment of some members of the family. These people were described as the Bestwood Cartel and the Godfathers of Nottingham gang crime.

== Bus services ==
Bestwood has frequent bus services ran by Nottingham City Transport that travel through the estate; the main services include several services on the Brown Line which travel through Andover Road, Gainsford Crescent and Southglade Road in the direction of Nottingham to Rise Park via Hucknall Road, City Hospital and Top Valley. NCT services serving Bestwood: Brown Line 15 City - Rise Park via Hucknall Road, Arnold Road and Tesco

Brown Line 16/16C City - Rise Park via Hucknall Road, Andover Road, Southglade and Tesco

- 16C stops along and terminates on Brownlow Drive but does stop at the Rise Park Terminus City-bound

Brown Line 17 City - Bulwell via Hucknall Road and St Alban's Road

Turquoise Line 79 City (loop) - Arnold via Nuthall Road, Bulwell Bus Station, Rise Park terminus(serves both directions) and Beckhampton Road/Chipenham Road

Purple Line 87 City - Arnold via Edwards Lane, Oxclose Lane and Redhill

Purple Line 88 City - Top Valley (loop) via Edwards Lane, Chipenham Road and Betswood Park Drive

Purple Line 89 City - Rise Park via Edwards Lane, Beckhampton Road and Bestwood Park Drive/ BPD West

There are also other bus services that travel just outside the estate on Hucknall Road run by Nottingham City Transport and TrentBarton.

== Notable people ==
- Harold Shipman, one of the most prolific serial killers in recorded history
- Philip Atherton, murderer of schoolboy Wayne Keeton
