= The Oakwood Academy =

Coordinates: 53.014835°N 1.1591434°W

Location
- Bewcastle Road; Nottingham; England

Information
- Type: Academy
- Trust: The Redhill Academy Trust (2015–)
- Department for Education URN: 141363 Tables
- Ofsted: Reports
- Head teacher: Andrew Gilbert
- Age: 11 to 16
- Website: www.oakwoodacademy.org.uk

The Oakwood Academy (formerly Big Wood School) is a secondary school located on Bewcastle Road, Warren Hill, Nottingham, England. It is for 11- to 16-year-olds and is co-educational. The school specialises in business and enterprise and was one of the first schools to be built in Nottingham under the Building Schools for the Future programme.

Previously a community school administered by Nottingham City Council, Big Wood School converted to academy status on 1 April 2015 and was renamed the Oakwood Academy after the oak tree in front of the main entrance, outside the school grounds. The school is now sponsored by the Redhill Academy Trust but continues to coordinate with Nottingham City Council for admissions.
