= Top Valley =

Area of Nottingham, England

Coordinates: 53.006°N 1.168°W

- Location within Nottinghamshire
- OS grid reference: SK 55822 45767
- Unitary authority: Nottingham
- Ceremonial county: Nottinghamshire
- Region: East Midlands
- Country: England
- Sovereign state: United Kingdom
- Post town: NOTTINGHAM
- Postcode district: NG5
- Dialling code: 0115
- Police: Nottinghamshire
- Fire: Nottinghamshire
- Ambulance: East Midlands
- UK Parliament: Nottingham North and Kimberley

Top Valley is a largely residential area in the north west of Nottingham, England. It is located to the south of Rise Park, to the north and west of Bestwood, to the southwest of Bestwood Village and to the east of Bulwell. It is approximately 4 miles from Nottingham city centre.

== History ==
The estate was built in the 1970s on the grounds of Top Valley farm, Forest farm and Home farm. In September 1948 it had been announced that there would be a new municipal golf course on the site, improving upon and replacing the existing course at Bulwell Common.The plans were rejected however in March 1949 due to agricultural needs.

In 1970 it was reported that a housing estate would be built with work due to commence in August 1971 and to be completed in 1976. For the most part, construction progressed from west to east with the first houses appearing before the end of 1972. The Top Valley farmhouse was knocked down in 1973 and replaced with Knights Close whilst the Forest farmhouse had stood at the south-west corner of what is now Brisbane Drive.

In March 1983 a Tesco supermarket was opened on the former site of the railway wagon works south of Top Valley Way, the railway line itself having closed in the mid-1960s and now a tree-lined footpath on the western boundary of the estate. The original supermarket building was demolished and replaced with a larger construction circa 2005/06.

Another notable change occurred during the 2010s in the Bakewell Drive area with several dwellings demolished and replaced with modern housing. In early 2018 the former children's home at Ranskill Gardens was demolished (having closed in the late 2000s). Eight new 'ecohomes' are being built on the site by Positive Homes – all to 'A' rated Energy Performance Certificate Standards, making them among the most energy efficient homes in the UK. This is set to be followed in 2019 by a large ecohome development on the former Eastglade Primary School site by Nottingham City Homes.

== Politics ==
Top Valley is represented by Nottingham City Council and its boundaries run across the two wards of Bulwell Forest and Bestwood. Both wards are represented by three Labour Party councillors with Bulwell Forest (covering the parts of Top Valley to the west of Old Farm Road) represented by Councillors Cheryl Barnard, Eunice Campbell and Nick McDonald, and Bestwood (covering the parts of Top Valley to the east of Old Farm Road) are represented by Councillors Brian Grocock, David Smith and Georgia Power. The area lies in the Nottingham North constituency and has been represented by Labour Party MP Alex Norris since 2017. In the 2017 general election he retained the seat with a majority of 11,160 votes after the former MP Graham Allen stood down.

== Schools ==
There were originally two Primary schools serving the area either side of Old Farm Road, Westglade and Eastglade, the latter was closed in 2007 and then demolished. Top Valley Comprehensive School, now known as Park Vale Academy, was opened in September 1973, Big Wood School on Bewcastle Road, now known as The Oakwood Academy, in September 1978.
