= Bestwood Park =

Council estate in Nottingham, England

Coordinates: 53.003°N 1.157°W

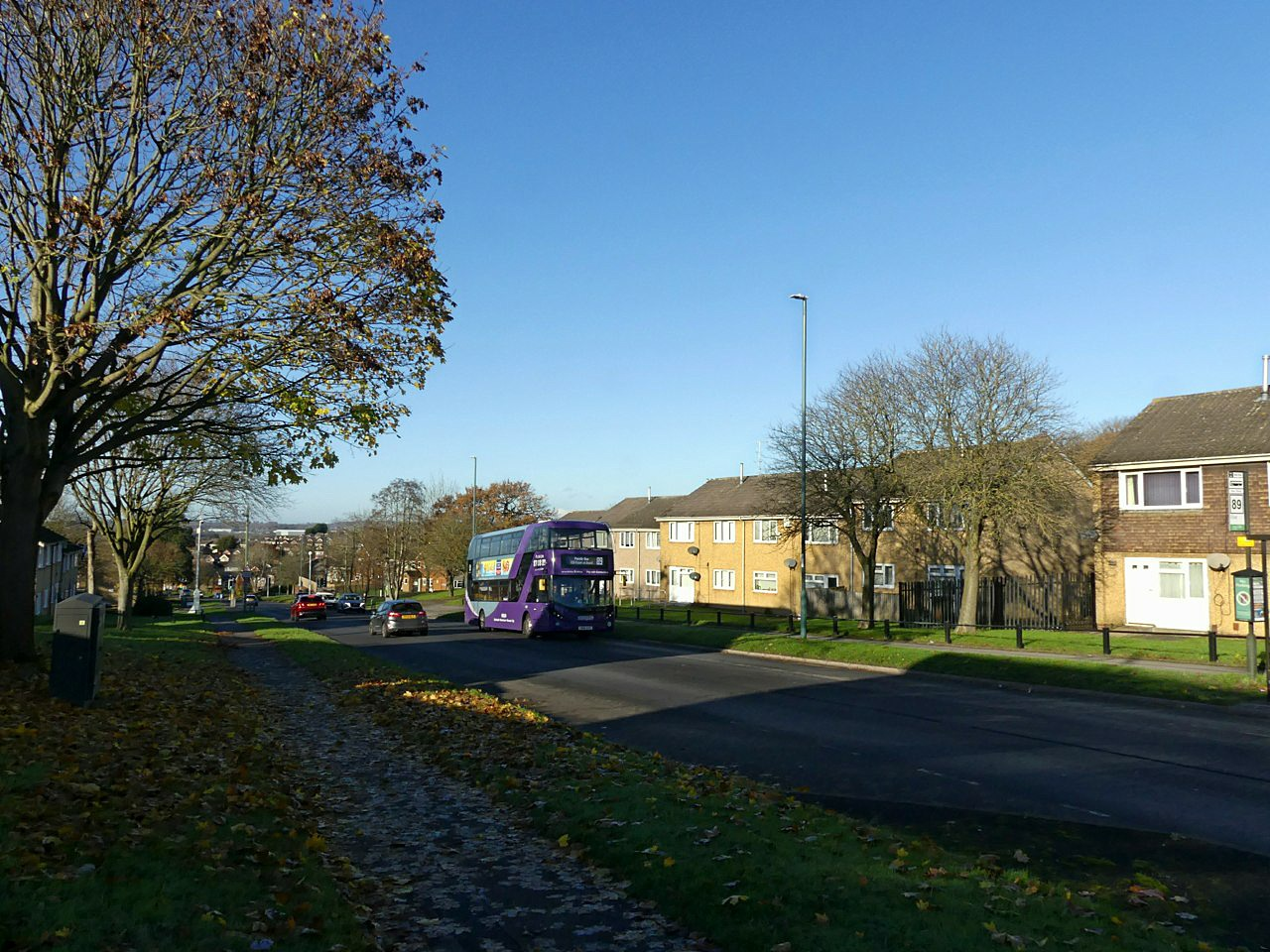
- Bestwood Park Drive

- Location within Nottinghamshire
- Population: 7,196
- OS grid reference: SK5656445442
- Unitary authority: Nottingham
- Ceremonial county: Nottinghamshire
- Region: East Midlands
- Country: England
- Sovereign state: United Kingdom
- Post town: NOTTINGHAM
- Postcode district: NG5
- Dialling code: 0115
- Police: Nottinghamshire
- Fire: Nottinghamshire
- Ambulance: East Midlands
- UK Parliament: Nottingham North

Bestwood Park is a large post-war council estate located to the north of the city of Nottingham, England, and roughly bounded by Beckhampton Road, Oxclose Lane and Queens Bower Road.

== Origins ==
It is distinct from the older Bestwood Estate to the west. Development began during the late 1950s and early 1960s, whereas Bestwood Estate was developed during the 1930s.

== Schools ==
Glade Hill Primary and Nursery School and Robin Hood Primary School.

== Churches ==
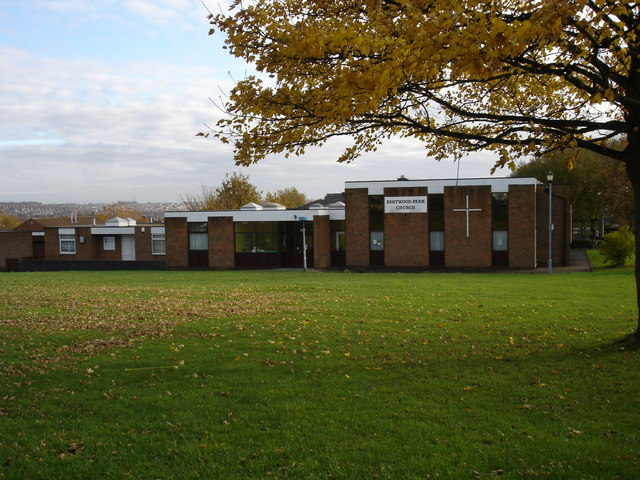
Bestwood Park Church

Bestwood Park Church (Beckhampton Road), Infant of Prague Catholic Church (Cherry Orchard Mount), and The Peoples Church (Gladehill Road).

== Green Areas ==
Sandy Banks Local Nature Reserve (LNR), and Glade Hill wood. The latter is on a small hill and so visible from all around. It is erroneously known locally as "Bendigo's Ring" since the original place of this name, in Bestwood Estate, is much less visible.

== Cricket ground ==
Bestwood Park Cricket Ground was a cricket ground laid out in 1867 by William Beauclerk, 10th Duke of St Albans in the Bestwood Park area. It hosted one important match when in 1879 a Nottinghamshire Eleven played the MCC. The ground is now a public recreation area.

== Bus Services ==
Bestwood Park has frequent bus services run by Nottingham City Council that serve the estate; the main services include the Turquoise 79 service which travels through Beckhampton Road, Chippenham Road and Queen's Bower Road in the direction of Nottingham and Arnold via Bulwell and Rise Park. The Purple 88 serves Chippenham Road and Queen's Bowers Road in the direction of Nottingham, Top Valley and Warren Hill via Sherwood and Edwards Lane and the Purple 89 which serves Beckhampton road in the direction of Nottingham to Rise Park via Sherwood and Edwards Lane.

There are also NCT services that serve Beckhampton Road which run during peak times or offer night services as well as a school bus service which serves the estate in the direction of Rise Park and several schools in the Aspley ward. There is also a Shoplink service run by CT4N which also serves Beckhampton Road in the direction of Bulwell and Mapperley via Arnold.
