= Rise Park, Nottingham =

Suburb of Nottingham, England

Coordinates: 53.012°N 1.176°W

Rise Park
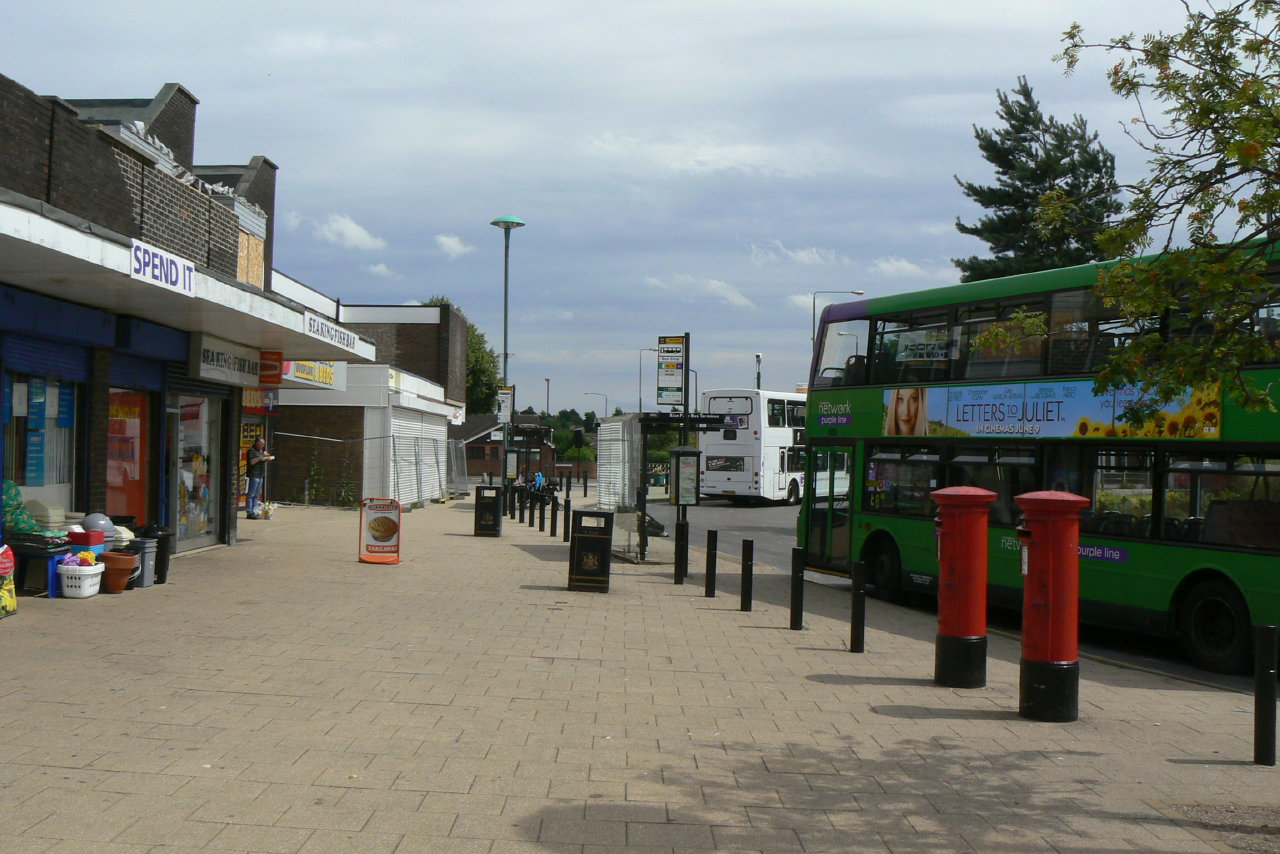
- Rise Park bus terminus in May 2010

- Location within Nottinghamshire
- OS grid reference: SK 55277 46428
- Unitary authority: Nottingham
- Ceremonial county: Nottinghamshire
- Region: East Midlands
- Country: England
- Sovereign state: United Kingdom
- Post town: NOTTINGHAM
- Postcode district: NG5
- Dialling code: 0115
- Police: Nottinghamshire
- Fire: Nottinghamshire
- Ambulance: East Midlands
- UK Parliament: Nottingham North and Kimberley

Rise Park is a suburb of Nottingham, located four miles north of the City Centre and three miles north-east of junction 26 of the M1 motorway. It comprises approximately 1500 homes, primarily privately owned houses and bungalows, and a small number of low rise, three-storey flats.

Construction of the estate began in the early 1960s, starting at the bottom of the hill to the west and gradually spreading upwards and eastwards to be completed in the early 1970s. It was built on the former site of Rise Farm (known as Bulwellrise Farm until around 1900), the southern boundary of which ran along the edge of what is now Rise Park Road, Langbank Avenue and Bracadale Road. The farmhouse had stood on what would now be the south-east corner of Haverhill Crescent. On the western boundary ran a railway line, closed in the mid-1960s and now a tree-lined footpath. To the north is Bestwood Country Park and to the east is another housing estate built in the late 1970s on the site of Home Farm. To the south are the schools, Rise Park primary and nursery school originally opened as separate infant and junior schools in September 1970 (after some delay) built on land once belonging to Top Valley Farm, as was Top Valley Academy which opened in September 1973. Stanstead school, an additional infant and juniors, was opened in 1977, the Rise Park schools having been forced to erect mobile classrooms to cope with the high demand.

Plans for a small parade of shops and a public house had been announced in 1966, built in 1969 and open for let by the end of that year, these originally included a branch of Martin the Newsagents, a post office, a grocers, a hairdressers, a Mace general store and the 'Big D' DIY store (closed 1987). At the eastern end of the shops was the Charles II pub with two large murals depicting the former King (who had connections to the area in the 1600s) on the upper South and East facing walls. An additional 'Grandways' supermarket was later built and opened for business in 1977 (taken over by 'Kwik Save' in 1991) but this was demolished and replaced with McCracken Close in the 2010s. Next to the shopping area is a church opened in 1968 and a bus terminus with frequent links to the City Centre and surrounding areas of Arnold and Bulwell. The market town of Hucknall is close by.
