= Joyce Townsley =

English actress (born 1941)

- Born: Joyce Rickett; 2 February 1941 (age 85); Mansfield, Nottinghamshire, England
- Occupation: Actress
- Years active: 2014–present
- Known for: Charity Shop Sue
- Spouse: Desmond Townsley (m. 1959)
- Children: 5

Joyce Townsley (née Rickett; born 2 February 1941) is an English actress, known for her role of Vera Goodard in the YouTube series Charity Shop Sue.

== Life and career ==
Townsley was born Joyce Rickett on 2 February 1941 in Mansfield, Nottinghamshire. She married Desmond Townsley in 1959 and they had five sons. In 2014, Townsley filmed Charity Shop Sue, a mockumentary web series written and directed by Stuart Edwards, Timothy Chesney and Matthew Chesney, following charity shop manager Sue Tuke (Selina Mosinski) and her group of volunteers in the fictional charity shop Sec*hand Chances located in Bulwell, Nottingham. Goodard portrayed the role of Vera Goodard, a long-term volunteer at the charity shop who often clashes with Sue regarding her over ambitious schemes and behaviour. The series was released on YouTube in October 2019, five years after it was filmed. Townsley also appeared in the spin-offs Charity Shop Sue's Christmas and Ey Up Notts in 2017 and 2019 respectively. She also featured in the audio book Charity Shop Sue's Tools for Management and Success in 2024. Townsley was also one of the founding members of the Ravenshead Theatre Group, and appeared in various productions with the company.

== Filmography ==
Year	Title	Role	Notes	Ref.
2017, 2019	Ey Up Notts	Vera Goodard	Notts TV series	
2017	Charity Shop Sue's Christmas	Vera Goodard	Sky TV special	
2019	Charity Shop Sue	Vera Goodard	Web series	

=== Audio ===
Year	Title	Role	Notes	Ref.
2024	Charity Shop Sue's Tools for Management and Success	Vera Goodard	Audio book	
