= Sherrie Johnson =

English actress (born 1977)

- Born: Sherrie Therese Johnson; 3 January 1977 (age 48); Nottingham, England
- Occupation: Actress
- Years active: 2014–present
- Known for: This is England '90; Charity Shop Sue
- Spouse: Joanne Johnson (m. 2011)

Sherrie Therese Johnson (born 3 January 1977) is an English actress, known for her roles as Nikki in This Is England '90 (2015) and Kersch Callahan in the YouTube series Charity Shop Sue (2019).

== Life and career ==
Sherrie Therese Johnson was born on 3 January 1977 in Nottingham, England. In 2014, Johnson filmed Charity Shop Sue, a mockumentary web series written and directed by Stuart Edwards, Timothy Chesney and Matthew Chesney, following charity shop manager Sue Tuke (Selina Mosinski) and her group of volunteers in the fictional charity shop Sec*hand Chances located in Bulwell, Nottingham. Johnson portrayed the role of Kersch Callahan, a delivery driver who joined the shop as part of a probation scheme. The series was released on YouTube in October 2019, five years after it was filmed. Johnson also appeared in the spin-offs Charity Shop Sue's Christmas and Ey Up Notts in 2017 and 2019 respectively.

In 2015, Johnson joined the cast of the Channel 4 mini-series in This Is England '90 as Nikki, the lesbian lover of Chrissy (Katherine Dow Blyton), appearing in three episodes.

== Filmography ==
Year	Title	Role	Notes	Ref.
2017, 2019	Ey Up Notts	Kersch Callahan	Notts TV series	
2017	Charity Shop Sue's Christmas	Kersch Callahan	Sky TV special	
2015	This is England '90	Nikki	3 episodes	
2019	Charity Shop Sue	Kersch Callahan	Web series	
