= Nicola Harness =

English actress (born 1987)

- Born: Nicola Harness; 1987 (age 38–39); Nottingham, England
- Occupation: Actress
- Years active: 2014–present
- Known for: Charity Shop Sue

Nicola Jayne Harness (born 1987) is an English actress, known for portraying the role of Viki Wilson in the YouTube series Charity Shop Sue.

== Life and career ==
Nicola Jayne Harness was born in 1987 in Nottingham. In 2014, Harness filmed Charity Shop Sue, a mockumentary web series that was written and directed by Stuart Edwards, Timothy Chesney and Matthew Chesney, following charity shop manager Sue Tuke (Selina Mosinski) and her group of volunteers in the fictional charity shop Sec*hand Chances located in Bulwell, Nottingham. Harness portrayed the role of Viki Wilson, the youngest volunteer at the shop who is often roped into Sue's schemes and has aspirations of becoming a vet. The series was released on YouTube in October 2019, five years after it was filmed. Harness also appeared as the character in the spin-offs Charity Shop Sue's Christmas and Ey Up Notts in 2017 and 2019 respectively. She has appeared in several of Charity Shop Sue's social media skits and appeared with Mosinski at pride events, as well as appearing with her on MTV Cribs and featuring in the audio book Charity Shop Sue's Tools for Management and Success in 2024. Harness also volunteered for the project Backlit, in which a group of people are took part in a public karaoke session in Sneinton help overcome their shyness. Outside of acting, Harness has worked for the energy companies Robin Hood Energy and Yü Energy in Nottingham, winning a Bake Off competition for Macmillan Cancer Support at the latter.

== Filmography ==
Year	Title	Role	Notes	Ref.
2017, 2019	Ey Up Notts	Viki Wilson	Notts TV series	
2017	Charity Shop Sue's Christmas	Viki Wilson	Sky TV special	
2019	Charity Shop Sue	Viki Wilson	Web series	
2021	MTV Cribs	Viki Wilson	1 episode	

=== Audio ===
Year	Title	Role	Notes	Ref.
2024	Charity Shop Sue's Tools for Management and Success	Viki Wilson	Audio book	
