= Charity Shop Sue (web series) =

British mockumentary web series

- Genre: Mockumentary
- Created by: Matthew Chesney; Timothy Chesney; Stuart Edwards
- Written by: Matthew Chesney; Timothy Chesney; Stuart Edwards
- Directed by: Matthew Chesney; Timothy Chesney; Stuart Edwards
- Starring: Selina Mosinski; Joyce Townsley; Sherrie Johnson; Nicola Harness
- Opening theme: "Sec*Hand Chances" by Alison Darksus and Nicola Harness
- Country of origin: United Kingdom
- Original language: English
- No. of seasons: 1
- No. of episodes: 19

Production
- Executive producer: Shane Meadows
- Producers: Vicky McClure; Mary Kearns; Penny Linfield
- Running time: 6–12 minutes
- Production company: Spool

Original release
- Network: YouTube
- Release: 15 October – 19 November 2019

Charity Shop Sue is a British mockumentary web series broadcast on YouTube between October and November 2019. The series was created by Matthew and Timothy Chesney and Stuart Edwards and filmed in Bulwell, Nottingham, in the fictional charity shop Sec*hand Chances. It starred Selina Mosinski as shop manager Sue Tuke, along with Joyce Townsley, Sherrie Johnson and Nicola Harness. The series was popular with the LGBTQ+ community and received praise from The Guardian for being "bleak, relatable and so funny".

== Production ==
The mockumentary series Charity Shop Sue was created, written and directed by twin brothers Matthew and Timothy Chesney and Stuart Edwards, with Shane Meadows serving as executive producer. The series filmed for three weeks in 2014, in Bulwell, Nottingham. The location for Sec*hand Chances, the fictional charity shop used in the series was at the ExtraCare Charitable Trust, a real charity shop on Bulwell Main Street, next door to Poundland.

A Christmas pilot, Charity Shop Sue's Christmas, aired on Notts TV in December 2017 as part of Sky Comedy, which featured a cameo from Nottingham-born actress Vicky McClure, who also produced the series, alongside Mary Kearns and Penny Linfield, the latter of whom appeared in the series' fifteenth episode. The character of Sue Tuke, aka "Charity Shop Sue" (played by Selina Mosinski), began gaining online attention on social media in the late 2010s, and following on from the character's popularity, the series consisting of eighteen episodes was released on YouTube in October 2019, five years after it was filmed.

== Plot ==
Following on from Charity Shop Sue's internet fame, a group of local filmmakers release previously unseen footage from five years prior, when they were invited to film a documentary inside the charity shop Sec*hand Chances, which follows manager Sue Tuke and her group of volunteers, Vera, Kersch and Viki. Sue anticipates that partaking in the documentary will boost the shop's revenue and custom, with hopes of being noticed on the internet. Throughout the series, Sue is constantly coming up with overambitious schemes to save the shop from being closed down, which she frequently coerces her volunteers into going along with and results in a series of fiascos that sees her refuse to take part in anymore filming.

== Cast and characters ==
=== Main ===
- Sue Tuke (Selina Mosinski) – the domineering, power-hungry and borderline sociopathic manager of Bulwell-based charity shop Sec*hand Chances. She is a former fashion stylist who previously worked for multiple celebrities in Paris and Milan, and is constantly coming up with new ideas in an attempt to boost the failing shop's image and custom, whilst undermining her volunteers and occasionally manipulating her customers with her optimistic schemes.
- Vera Goodard (Joyce Townsley) – an elderly volunteer who frequently criticises Sue's management skills and behaviour. She is kind and understanding, but quickly grows tired of Sue's schemes and is usually the first to voice her opinion which usually results in her bickering and arguing with Sue.
- Kersch Callahan (Sherrie Johnson) – a delivery driver who joined the shop as part of a probation scheme. She is good natured and credits the shop with helping people get back on their feet. She met a girl named Ally in prison and is waiting for her to be released. Kersch often goes along with Sue's schemes as not to rock the boat, but can at times take control of situations which agitates Sue.
- Viki Wilson (Nicola Harness) – the youngest of the volunteers who is quieter than the rest and is often taken advantage of by Sue and her boyfriend Dwayne. She is creative and is often seen making her own greetings cards and other craft items. Viki plays the keyboard and performs songs with her friend Madalicat363. She also rescues a dog whom she names Dodo and is upset when she has to give her away.

=== Recurring ===
- The Cameraman (Stuart Edwards) – The cameraman who films the documentary inside the shop and serves as the narrator for the series. He often breaks the fourth wall and communicates with Sue and the volunteers, and is sometimes heard laughing during scenes.
- Dwayne (Chris Sainty) – Viki's controlling boyfriend and a local yob. He regularly takes advantage of Viki until she dumps him.
- Crystal (Melanie Jakubiak) – a local delinquent who regularly causes trouble, namely urinating outside the shop and excreting in the changing room. She is also featured in a love triangle with Dwayne and Viki
- Madalicat363 (Alison Darksus) – Viki's internet friend who regularly hangs out at the shop. She is also a singer and provides the vocals for the songs used in the series.
- Gloria (Becky Matter) – a volunteer who does not wish to be filmed and therefore refuses to be shown on camera. She later suffers a panic attack. Sue forces her to take three weeks off as she doesn't want her bad energy reflecting on the shop ahead of Janet's visit.
- Belinda (Jackie Edwards) – Sue's sister with whom she has a strained relationship with. She sticks her fingers up at Sue whilst walking past the shop and later gets involved in argument with her over their mother's belongings and ends up storming out. She later runs into the shop to use the toilet, and Sue gives her a stack of newspapers as a substitute for toilet paper.
- Herself / angry customer (Vicky McClure) – McClure appears as herself in the Christmas special and visits the shop as part of an appeal. She also appears as an angry customer who barges into the staff room because she wants serving in the sixth episode of the series.

=== Guest ===
- Vinny (Vincent Hunter) – a market trader who Sue mistakenly calls "Billy" that flirts with her before she buys some vegetables from him.
- Sharon (Käthe Shipman Shirl) – a customer who Sue helps find a new outfit and questions what dress size she is before styling her in a velour tracksuit.
- Joe (Charlie Wesson) – a recently widowed gentleman who visits the shop to donate some of his wife's possessions, including a "Royal Lady" which Sue cons him into thinking is fake.
- Mystery man (Shane Meadows) – a man whom Sue meets outside the front of the shop after it is closed to sell him Crystal's soiled knickers.
- Antique Hunt contestants (Karen Chesney / Peter Chesney / Tom Frankenburg) – members of the public that are holding their antiques in various locations for Sue to evaluate during her antique hunt.
- Mum (Khia Bianca) & Child on tram (Adreanna Bianca) – a mother and child on the tram during Sue's antique hunt who Sue attempts to pressurise into looking for a man holding her donation.
- Mike (Phil Green) – a collection man that Sue falsely accuses of touching her breast as an excuse to explain to Kersch why a fridge hasn't been collected. After Sue tells Viki to back up her story, she mistakenly tells Kersch that Mike touched her breast too, but when Kersch calls him he denies this and Sue says she was joking.
- Customer opening oven (Michelle Long) – a customer who Sue forces to open an oven door as part of her latest scheme of putting cuddly toys in the oven to entice a purchase. The same customer later backs up the young mum's story after her son accidentally breaks the cabinet.
- Young Mum (Dina Gold) & Child breaking cabinet (Louis Gold) – a mother who is visiting the shop alongside her son, the latter of whom breaks Sue's wooden cabinet, with Sue attempting to get him to do Saturday work or use his pocket money to pay for the damage.
- Man buying book (John Birch) – a man who attempts to buy a book from the shop but is coerced by Sue into putting money in a donation tin for Mable, a volunteer who recently died.
- Dodo the Dog (Lula Chettle) – a dog that Viki rescues and hides upstairs in the shop, before Kersch finds her a new home.
- Grace (Bo Olawoye) – a woman who Sue finds waiting for a refund on a jacket she bought. Sue gives her the refund but takes a cut of the money back, charging her for the coffee one of the volunteers had made her.
- Mr Stubbs (Stuart Lawrence) – a man who calls Sue demanding back a bag of his mother's items that were dropped off at the shop. When Sue tells him they've already gone, he asks for compensation and threatens to go to the press.
- Pamela Jenkins (Penny Linfield) – a woman who Kersch discovers online to come and rescue Dodo the Dog, and subsequently ends up arguing with Sue after the latter asks for a donation.
- Dolly customer (Joanne Johnson) – a frustrated customer who wanted to buy a doll for her mother but changed her mind and became irritable because the shop wasn't open on time due to Sue having a nosebleed.
- Janet (Michelle Bowen) – the area manageress who pays a visit to Sec*hand Chances to discuss the prospect of having to close down the Bulwell branch due to a lack of revenue and complaints from head office. She also appears to be friends with Vera which doesn't sit well with Sue.

== Episodes ==
No. overall	No. in series	Title	Directed by	Written by	Original release date
Christmas Special
19	19	"Charity Shop Sue's Christmas"	Matthew Chesney; Timothy Chesney; Stuart Edwards	Matthew Chesney; Timothy Chesney; Stuart Edwards	21 December 2017
Prior to the events of the series, Sec*hand Chances launches a Christmas appeal video on social media in a bid to encourage donations, however, it draws little interest. Sue chats to a woman called Tanya, and takes the food for her Christmas dinner as a donation. Patron Vicky McClure visits the shop to as part of the appeal. Kersch informs Sue that the bag of items brought in earlier are stolen and are being tracked by the police, so Sue gives them to Vicky McClure, who is questioned by police for handling stolen goods.
Series
1	1	"Sec*hand Chances"	Matthew Chesney; Timothy Chesney; Stuart Edwards	Matthew Chesney; Timothy Chesney; Stuart Edwards	15 October 2019
A cameraman is invited into the charity shop Sec*hand Chances in Bulwell, Nottingham, to film footage for an internet documentary. He is introduced to manager Sue Tuke and her volunteers Vera, Kersch and Viki. Sue announces her plans to expand into online merchandising. Delivery driver Kersch, who joined two years ago on a probation scheme, explains how Sec*Hand Chances helped her and other people gain social skills and get back on their feet.
2	2	"The Makeover"	Matthew Chesney; Timothy Chesney; Stuart Edwards	Matthew Chesney; Timothy Chesney; Stuart Edwards	15 October 2019
Sue visits Bulwell Market where she blags some freebies and some vegetables from Vinny, who she refers to as Billy. Back at the shop, she shows off a new dress she has styled for a mannequin, before recalling on her stylist days in Paris and Milan to pick out an outfit for a customer, which transpires to be a velour tracksuit. Sue berates Kersch for her selling skills and tells her to improve, before rescuing Viki from a group of yobs outside the shop.
3	3	"The Refurb"	Matthew Chesney; Timothy Chesney; Stuart Edwards	Matthew Chesney; Timothy Chesney; Stuart Edwards	15 October 2019
Viki and her internet friend Madalicat363 are playing about with a keyboard, which gives Sue an idea to create and film a pop video inside the shop. Gloria, another volunteer, expresses her dismay at being filmed and storms out. Meanwhile, at the back of the shop, Sue reveals her more than ambitious plans for the refurbishment, should their branch win the franchise competition, which includes decking, a cocktail bar and a slide for kids.
4	4	"Royal Lady"	Matthew Chesney; Timothy Chesney; Stuart Edwards	Matthew Chesney; Timothy Chesney; Stuart Edwards	22 October 2019
Viki is involved in a love triangle, which erupts into an argument between her boyfriend Dwayne and Crystal. Whilst on a phone call with Bernie, the husband of volunteer Mable, Sue argues that Mable's age is not an excuse for her not turning up for work. Sue attempts to sell a damaged oven, before widower Joe comes in to donate a Royal Lady, but Sue manages to swindle him into believing the items are knock-offs so she can sell them online.
5	5	"Panic Attack!"	Matthew Chesney; Timothy Chesney; Stuart Edwards	Matthew Chesney; Timothy Chesney; Stuart Edwards	22 October 2019
Gloria, who is still refusing to partake in the filming, suffers a panic attack and Sue is quick to try and defuse the situation with her ten step plan, but becomes frustrated when Kersch resolves things instead. Viki shows off her homemade greetings cards. Sue is furious when Crystal comes in and excretes in the changing room. Vera explains that the former manager was more lenient with Crystal and tells Sue that she should be more understanding of her situation.
6	6	"Rot Test Challenge"	Matthew Chesney; Timothy Chesney; Stuart Edwards	Matthew Chesney; Timothy Chesney; Stuart Edwards	22 October 2019
Sue and the volunteers embark on the "Rot Test Challenge", which entails posting photos of stained items of clothing on social media and asking the public what they think the stain is. An angry customer enters the staff room and wants serving, while Viki injures herself whilst play fighting with Kersch. Kersch is upset as her girlfriend has her prison sentence extended. Sue tries to cheer Kersch up by giving her a management guide, before meeting a mystery man whom she sells Crystal's soiled underwear to.
7	7	"Sue's Antique Hunt"	Matthew Chesney; Timothy Chesney; Stuart Edwards	Matthew Chesney; Timothy Chesney; Stuart Edwards	29 October 2019
Sue embarks on an antique hunt around Bulwell, which sees her having to answer riddles and take on challenges to locate items to raise money for charity. At Bulwell Bogs, she encounters a man with a teapot, then finds a £20 note before heading to the tram but is unsuccessful in finding the man holding a donation. Her next antique is a 1950's necklace, but encourages the owner to keep it for sentimental value. When Sue arrives back at the shop and is told by Vera and Viki they have only raised £35, she is not happy.
8	8	"Poophoria"	Matthew Chesney; Timothy Chesney; Stuart Edwards	Matthew Chesney; Timothy Chesney; Stuart Edwards	29 October 2019
Sue's sister Belinda visits the shop to bring some donations, but quickly ends up arguing with Sue over the ownership of their mother's possessions. Sue reprimands Viki for lying on a display sofa and becomes tired of her colleagues slacking off to watch a film in the staff room. An accident in the bathroom leads to Gloria suffering from "poophoria", and after calling Kersch for some advice, Sue attempts to sort the situation.
9	9	"Love Scream"	Matthew Chesney; Timothy Chesney; Stuart Edwards	Matthew Chesney; Timothy Chesney; Stuart Edwards	29 October 2019
Viki secretly meets her boyfriend Dwayne, but does not want Sue to find out, and plays him a song she and Madalicat363 wrote, before Dwayne forces them both to lick an ice cream and asks them to kiss. Sue says Vera has not been working hard enough for days, blaming her for the shop being a mess. In order to explain the mess to Kersch, Sue makes up a story that collection man Mike touched her breast and tries to rope Viki into her lie, which backfires. Sue later admits she was joking but Kersch does not see the funny side, before receiving a phone call from Bernie to say that Mable has died.
10	10	"Grand Designs"	Matthew Chesney; Timothy Chesney; Stuart Edwards	Matthew Chesney; Timothy Chesney; Stuart Edwards	5 November 2019
Viki makes a donation tin in memory of Mable, as well as a sympathy card for her widower Bernie. Sue plans some new designs for inside the shop, including sales techniques such as putting cuddly toys inside an oven, using the inside of a fridge as a book shelf and putting a doll inside a cupboard. After discovering a broken mirror, Sue suspects that Vera's friend is the culprit. Kersch and Vera are less than optimistic about Sue's plans and she overhears them disparaging her ideas.
11	11	"The Funeral"	Matthew Chesney; Timothy Chesney; Stuart Edwards	Matthew Chesney; Timothy Chesney; Stuart Edwards	5 November 2019
Vera and Kersch ask Sue to listen to their ideas, but she is less than keen. Sue is angry when a little boy damages her wooden cabinet and she tries to find a way for him to repay his debt, before accusing Kersch of undermining her. It is the day of Mable's funeral and Viki is disappointed that she cannot attend, while Sue is dressed scantily. Viki asks a customer to put some money in Mable's tin and Sue joins in, asking him to pay up so that they can go to Skegness to scatter her ashes. Viki steals some food from the fridge to help the less fortunate.
12	12	"Sue Returns"	Matthew Chesney; Timothy Chesney; Stuart Edwards	Matthew Chesney; Timothy Chesney; Stuart Edwards	5 November 2019
Kersch explains to Viki that she cannot keep a dog in the shop after she found her tied up. Vera arrives back at the shop and is upset by Sue's outlandish behaviour at Mable's funeral. Whilst Vera is reminiscing with Kersch about her times with Mable, a drunk Sue returns with a tray of buffet food from the wake and starts laughing, which infuriates Vera, and a huge argument erupts between the pair. Sue falls asleep in the staff room, whilst Viki and Kersch attempt to come up with a solution for what to do with the dog.
13	13	"Calmer-Sue-Tra"	Matthew Chesney; Timothy Chesney; Stuart Edwards	Matthew Chesney; Timothy Chesney; Stuart Edwards	12 November 2019
A hungover Sue arrives at the shop with Vera expecting an apology. Sue claims her drink was spiked and says that was the reason for her behaviour, before heading upstairs for some space. However, Sue discovers the dog that Viki has been hiding. After taking the dog for a walk, Sue returns and accuses her staff of deceiving her, fearing a health and safety visit. Kersch explains that she has been trying to re-home her. The missing food from the fridge raises eyebrows at Sec*hand Chances and Sue believes the woman from the local food bank has been stealing from them. Vera tries to cheer Viki up by giving her a voucher for a makeover.
14	14	"The Refund"	Matthew Chesney; Timothy Chesney; Stuart Edwards	Matthew Chesney; Timothy Chesney; Stuart Edwards	12 November 2019
Sue returns to the shop to find a customer called Grace waiting for her who wants a refund for a jacket, sitting reading a book and drinking a coffee. Grace claims there is a stain on the jacket, but Sue tells her that the stain is part of the design. She gives her a £3.50 refund, but takes £2 back for the coffee. claiming it is fair trade. Sue tells Viki not to get attached to the dog and asks her to reimburse the dog food she had to buy. Sue says she is having a lovely afternoon, and her, Kersch and Viki do impressions, before Sue receives a call from a man wanting compensation for his items.
15	15	"Puppy Love"	Matthew Chesney; Timothy Chesney; Stuart Edwards	Matthew Chesney; Timothy Chesney; Stuart Edwards	12 November 2019
Kersch has found a home for the dog, and a woman named Pamela Jenkins arrives to collect her. Sue sees this as an opportunity to make some money, telling Pamela she could have sold the dog instead and a row ensues when she asks Pamela to give a donation. Sue has a chat with the nuns and is ecstatic when a bag of luxury clothing arrives, which inspires her to organise a fashion show.
16	16	"It's the New Me"	Matthew Chesney; Timothy Chesney; Stuart Edwards	Matthew Chesney; Timothy Chesney; Stuart Edwards	19 November 2019
The shop is late opening due to Sue suffering from a nose bleed and a customer is furious because it was not open on time and she could not buy a doll. Viki returns from her makeover and says it's the "new her", but a jealous Sue tells her it is not, and that she should not go to Vera for make-up advice. Mable's death has left a hole in the company and chaos ensues when Sue says she needs a new steamer. Vera and Sue end up arguing again after Vera suggests Sue is making soup in a bid to try and impress Janet ahead of her impending visit.
17	17	"Bad News"	Matthew Chesney; Timothy Chesney; Stuart Edwards	Matthew Chesney; Timothy Chesney; Stuart Edwards	19 November 2019
Sue organises a soup kitchen for the less fortunate, conveniently as the area manager Janet arrives. Sue is not happy when Janet is more interested in talking to Vera than her. Expecting news of the refurbishment, Sue is shocked when Janet tells her that Sec*hand Chances is not bringing in enough revenue and she is considering the possibility of closing it down, not helped by the fact head office have also received complaints about Sue.
18	18	"Fashion Show"	Matthew Chesney; Timothy Chesney; Stuart Edwards	Matthew Chesney; Timothy Chesney; Stuart Edwards	19 November 2019
Viki decides to dump her boyfriend Dwayne, much to his defiance and gives him a card telling him their relationship is over. The fashion show gets into full swing, with Sue and the colleagues modelling various outfits that are for sale. Dwayne breaks into the shop and is angry about Viki modelling, which sees a fight breaks out. It results in Vera being left in a neck brace and a wheelchair. Filming is interrupted by a phone call from head office and Sue declines to participate in any more filming, but gives a statement that reads "As one person I can't change the charity of the world, but I can change the world of charity".

== Reception ==
The series was popular and well received by the LGBTQ+ community. Sue Tuke was described as a "cringeworthy love-to-hate character" and received comparisons to David Brent from The Office and Jill Tyrell from Nighty Night. Mosinski described her character as a "psychopath" and added that "everyone knows a Sue". Nat Harris of The Guardian said finding a show such as Charity Shop Sue on YouTube was a "thrill" and identifies Sue as a "terrifying and brilliant character", with a "passive-aggressive tone and husky smoker's laugh", describing the series as "bleak, relatable and so funny". The series was created by three gay men, who based the character of Sue on several of the women in their lives, and was described as a "safe space" for the queer community. Speaking at The INDI's Film Festival in August 2021, creator Stuart Edwards expressed interest in writing a second series, as well as hopes for the show to be picked up by a broadcasting network.
