= Support band =

A support band may refer to

- Maternity clothing used to compress and support the womb
- Opening act, a band supporting the main performance at a concert

== See also ==
- Harness (disambiguation)
