= Harness =

Harness may refer to:

== Restraints and supports ==
- Bondage harness, a piece of BDSM equipment
- Child harness or walking harness, a safety device worn when walking
- Climbing harness, a belt attached to a safety rope
- Dog harness, straps used to hold or be pulled by a dog
- Five-point harness, a type of seatbelt
- Full harness, a restraint including a belly chain
- Horse harness, straps connecting a horse to its load
- Pet harness, straps used to hold or be assisted by a dog
- Safety harness, a form of protective equipment
- Windsurfing harness, part of the trapeze used in the sport

== People ==
- Arminta Harness (1928–2010), US Air Force engineer
- Charles L. Harness (1915–2005), American science fiction writer
- Cody Harness (born 1991), stage name Crystal Methyd, American drag performer
- Forest Harness (1895–1974), American lawyer and politician
- Henry Drury Harness (1804–1883), British soldier and civil commissioner
- James Harness, (died 2014), mechanic on reality TV series Gold Rush
- Jeffery Harness (born 1978), American attorney and politician
- Jim Harness (1934–2015), American football player
- Kyp Harness (born 1964), Canadian social activist and folk singer
- Marcus Harness (born 1996), English footballer
- Nathan Harness (born 2000), English footballer
- Nicola Harness (born 1987), English actress
- Peter Harness (born 1976), English playwright, screenwriter, actor and producer
- William Curtis Harness Jr. (born 1980), stage name Struggle Jennings, American rapper
- William Harness (1790–1869), English cleric and man of letters
- Wyn Harness (1960–2007), English journalist

== Other uses ==
- Agent harness, a tool for AI agents
- Cable harness or wiring harness, an assembly of electrical cables
- Harness racing, a form of horse racing
- Harness, a type of clinch in grappling
- Harness, Arkansas, a ghost town
- Loom harness, a component of a loom
- Test harness, a tool for verifying software
