= John White (cricketer, born 1855) =

English cricketer

Personal information
- Full name: John White
- Born: 2 March 1855; Bulwell, Nottinghamshire, England
- Died: Unknown
- Batting: Unknown
- Role: Wicket-keeper

Career statistics
Competition	First-class
Matches	3
Runs scored	73
Batting average	18.25
100s/50s	–/1
Top score	62
Balls bowled	–
Wickets	–
Bowling average	–
5 wickets in innings	–
10 wickets in match	–
Best bowling	–
Catches/stumpings	4/2
- Source: Cricinfo, 28 July 2013

John White (2 March 1855 – date of death unknown) was an English cricketer. White's batting style is unknown, though it is known he played as a wicket-keeper. He was born at Bulwell, Nottinghamshire.

White made his debut in first-class for the North of England in the North v South fixture of 1886 at Lords', during which White scored 62 runs batting at number ten in a tenth record stand of 157 runs with John Parnham (who made 90 not out), in what was the highest wicket partnership of the innings. The North won the match by 9 wickets. In that same season he made a first-class appearance for Liverpool and District against the touring Australians, and followed this up with a second first-class appearance for the team in 1890 against Yorkshire. He ended his brief first-class career with 73 runs at an average of 18.25, with four catches and two stumpings to his name.
