= Selina Mosinski =

English actress (born 1981)

- Born: Selina Fay Mosinski; 16 September 1981 (age 44); Derby, Derbyshire, England
- Occupation: Actress
- Years active: 2013–present
- Known for: Charity Shop Sue

Selina Fay Mosinski (born 16 September 1981) is an English actress, known for portraying the fictional charity shop manager and internet personality Sue Tuke, better known as Charity Shop Sue. Mosinski first appeared as the character in the online mockumentary series Charity Shop Sue which was filmed in 2014 and distributed in 2019, set in the fictional charity shop Sec*hand Chances in Bulwell, Nottingham.

Since the show's success, Charity Shop Sue has become popular within the LGBT community and on social media, with Mosinski making various media appearances as the character as a result, including on RuPaul's Drag Race UK and MTV Cribs UK, as well as appearing in an online comedy segment for Strictly Come Dancing and annually at LGBT pride events.

== Life and career ==
=== Career beginnings and Charity Shop Sue ===
Mosinski was born on 16 September 1981 in Derby, Derbyshire. She held various jobs, including working as a stripper and a sales assistant at House of Fraser, as well as running her own online business selling homemade paper craft dolls. Whilst attending drama school, she met the creators of Charity Shop Sue, an online comedy web series, written and directed by Stuart Edwards, Timothy Chesney and Matthew Chesney who asked Mosinski to read for the part of Sue Tuke. Mosinski, who was working at a call centre at the time, began working on skits with group onto the Charity Shop Sue social media accounts in 2013, and the following year, they filmed the series set in the fictional charity shop Sec*hand Chances in Bulwell, Nottingham. Mosinski plays the role of Sue Tuke, a former fashion stylist who previously worked for multiple celebrities in Paris and Milan and is now a domineering, power-hungry and borderline sociopathic manager who is constantly coming up with new ideas in an attempt to boost the failing shop's image and custom, and is often undermining her co-workers Vera Goodard (Joyce Townsley) and Kersch Callahan (Sherrie Johnson) and Viki Wilson (Nicola Harness). The series follows Sue inviting a cameraman into the shop to film a documentary in an attempt to increase revenue and her own popularity. The final episode sees Sue refuse to partake in any further filming.

The character began gaining online attention during the late 2010s as a result of the comedy videos on social media growing in popularity. One clip in particular that gained traction sees Sue exclaim: "Scuse me laydeh, you're supposed to be on the bloody till" to volunteer Viki. In 2017, a Christmas special was filmed which featured a cameo from actress Vicky McClure, who hails from Nottingham. The online series was posted to YouTube in October 2019 and consisted of eighteen episodes.

=== Media appearances ===
Mosinski has made several television appearances as Charity Shop Sue. In November 2019, she was one of the celebrities to join Rylan Clark-Neal during his 24-hour Ka-RY-oke challenge for Children in Need. She also attended the wrap party of first series of RuPaul's Drag Race UK and in March 2021, hosted the final VIQ private screening with the finalists of the second series where Lawrence Chaney was revealed as the winner. In the third series of RuPaul's Drag Race UK, drag queen Krystal Versace, who went on to win the series, portrayed Mosinski in character as Charity Shop Sue in the Snatch Game. The following episode, Mosinski herself appeared as the character as part of a charity shop chic runway challenge. In July 2020, she appeared on the Comedy Central series Dragony Aunts, hosted by Crystal Rasmussen and Candy Warhol. In August 2021, she appeared on MTV Cribs UK, showing viewers around her home in Nottingham. In December 2021, Charity Shop Sue appeared in an online comedy segment for Strictly Come Dancing. Mosinski was interviewed as herself on the Something Soon Podcast in January 2022. In September 2022, Charity Shop Sue made an appearance on GK Barry's podcast Saving Grace and Mosinski did a further interview as herself on the podcast Performer Trauma in December 2022. In May 2023, Mosinski appeared as Charity Shop Sue in an online comedy segment for the Eurovision Song Contest, in which she assumed the role of delegation manager. In August 2023, Mosinski appeared in the music video for "I Am Pulling My Eyes Out" by band The Happy Soul. Later that month, Mosinski embarked on her debut acting role outside of Charity Shop Sue, in the BBC comedy series Starstruck where she portrayed the role of nurse Ashley Deacon.

== In popular culture ==
Charity Shop Sue is popular with the LGBT community and has become a staple of gay culture. Mosinski appears as the character annually at Nottinghamshire Pride. In 2021 and 2022, she appeared at the "Mighty Hoopla" event at Brockwell Park. In June 2022, she appeared at the Victoria Centre in Nottingham to celebrate its 50th anniversary. She also appeared at that year's Manchester Pride, performing on the Alan Turing stage on 28 August.

== Filmography ==
Year	Title	Role	Notes	Ref.
2017, 2019	Ey Up Notts	Sue Tuke / Charity Shop Sue	Notts TV series	
2017	Charity Shop Sue's Christmas	Sue Tuke / Charity Shop Sue	Sky TV special	
2019	Charity Shop Sue	Sue Tuke / Charity Shop Sue	Web series	
2019	RuPaul's Drag Race UK	Sue Tuke / Charity Shop Sue	Series 1, episode 9	
2020	Dragony Aunts	Sue Tuke / Charity Shop Sue	Comedy Central series	
2020	At Home with Hayley	Sue Tuke / Charity Shop Sue	Sky TV series	
2021	RuPaul's Drag Race UK	Sue Tuke / Charity Shop Sue	Series 3, episode 7	
2021	MTV Cribs	Sue Tuke / Charity Shop Sue	Series 3, episode 3	
2023	Starstruck	Ashley Deacon	1 episode	
2024	Alma's Not Normal	Aunty Evie	2 episodes	
2025	What It Feels Like for a Girl (TV series)	Mikey	2 episodes	

=== Music videos ===
Year	Song	Artist	Ref.
2023	"I Am Pulling My Eyes Out"	The Happy Soul	
