= Bulwell =

Town in Nottinghamshire, England

Coordinates: 53.001°N 1.197°W

- Town
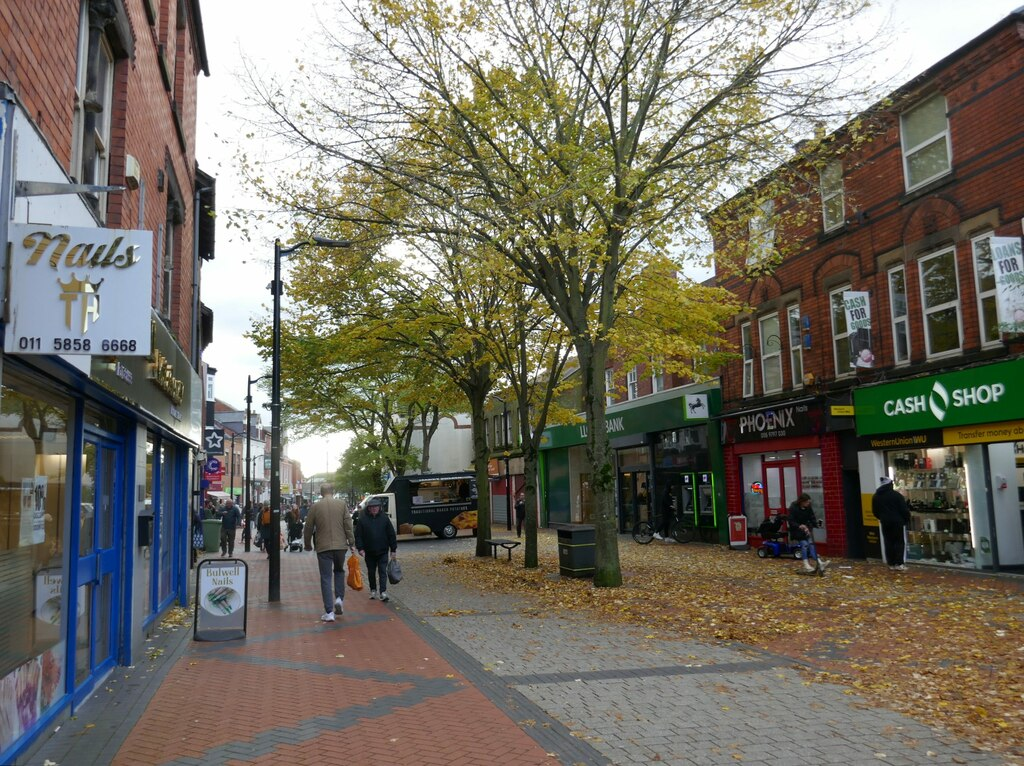
- Main Street

- Location within Nottinghamshire
- Population: 29,771 (Bulwell and Bulwell Forest wards, 2011)
- OS grid reference: SK 53882 45189
- Unitary authority: City of Nottingham
- Shire county: Nottinghamshire
- Region: East Midlands
- Country: England
- Sovereign state: United Kingdom
- Post town: NOTTINGHAM
- Postcode district: NG6
- Dialling code: 0115
- Police: Nottinghamshire
- Fire: Nottinghamshire
- Ambulance: East Midlands
- UK Parliament: Nottingham North and Kimberley

Bulwell is a market town and former civil parish in the City of Nottingham district of Nottinghamshire, England. It lies 3.5 miles (6 km) south-west of Hucknall and 4.8 miles (8 km) to the north-west of Nottingham city centre. The 2011 census recorded its population at 29,771, which amounted to over 10% of the city's population; 16,157 was recorded for the Bulwell ward of Nottingham City Council. The adjacent ward, Bulwell Forest, which includes Highbury Vale, Rise Park and the west of Top Valley, had a population of 13,614 at the same census.

== Toponymy ==
The name is thought to derive from the spring called "Bull Well", which runs out of the Bunter sandstone over a bed of clay, near the north end of the forest. The Place Names of Notts suggests that the first part of the name may stand for an Anglo Saxon person called Bulla or describe the bubbling sound produced by the flowing water of the spring.

One legend has it that the town was named after a bull struck a sandstone rock, causing it to seep water; a now sealed well-housing in the nature reserve off Bestwood Road, is said to be the original. Both Bulwell St Mary's School and the Seventh-day Adventist church next door have illustrations of the tale relief carved into sandstone blocks. Generations of Bulwell's children have grown up with the legend and the city council has erected a statue of a bull goring a well in the market place.

== History ==
=== Early settlers ===
The earliest documented settlements in Bulwell appeared around 800 AD and were most likely built around the same time as the first local bridge across the River Leen. The river was significantly narrower, shallower and slower-moving in Bulwell than in other potential locations along its length, and the threat of highwaymen was a danger on existing cross-country routes; thus a toll bridge was constructed at Bulwell, to allow bona fide travellers a quicker and safer passage from north to south, while impeding others.

The bridge created a rare direct road to Nottingham from the north-west, so introducing regular traffic from across the country to the area for the first time. A gatehouse was built for the toll-collectors; it also gave protection for travellers, and led to the founding of the new settlement. The travellers were an almost captive market, and the abundance of sandstone made it easy to build dwellings. As the volume of traffic using the road increased, so did the size and population of Bulwell.

Bulwell is recorded in the Domesday Book (1086) as "Buleuuelle" and classified as a village. Bulwell was by this time established as a small trading post for all kinds of goods and services, for those living and working in the surrounding area and for those travelling further afield, and this encouraged many others to settle in the wider area.

Local people, particularly the poorer new settlers, often offered space in their homes to travellers requiring overnight stops. For them it was a safer and perhaps more sociable arrangement than continuing to Nottingham. Using the river water, beer was produced locally; this may have led some guests to stay overnight unintentionally.

By around 1200, Bulwell had grown to provide all the facilities to accommodate animals and their drovers, offering full service on what was fast becoming a relatively major road. Trade thrived, and a steady stream of newcomers took advantage of the living that Bulwell could offer them.

However, although the trade was good for the local economy, the many new salesmen and tradesmen split the town in two: the established business owners, who had paid heavily to build and maintain their premises, complained of a growing number of roaming competitors undercutting their prices and taking their trade. Since they were also paying rates to the local landowner, they considered they had a right to a monopoly. In response to the complaints, a local law was enacted (around 1320) forbidding anyone without "fixed... and at least part-covered premises" to sell goods or services close to the original businesses.

The statute was ill-worded; salesmen simply fixed posts in the ground, creating market stalls similar to their modern counterparts. These were covered while in use and uncovered in situ when not, so abiding by the law and forming a permanent sales venue. Customers of these fought also against the richer businessmen and defended the right of marketeers to operate. The location of the Market Place remains almost unchanged. It still bustles on Tuesdays, Fridays and Saturdays.

=== 1100–1600 ===
The population grew steadily throughout the period, but the town itself did not grow much in area; opportunities for betterment and the desire of many to live further from the presumed unhealthy town centres ensured a relatively even flow of traffic in and out of Bulwell.

At some point, the magnesium limestone and the Bulwell sandstone, on which the town lies, began to be quarried. The strong, easily worked and durable rock, a dull yellow-orange magnesium limestone similar to the Bunter sandstone under Nottingham Castle, offered a building material easy to quarry. Many houses, schools, churches and garden walls of Bulwell sandstone stand to this day for miles around the town.

An early example can be found in sections of the wall surrounding Wollaton Hall, which was built using Bulwell stone in the late 16th century. The sheer quantities used there and elsewhere in the city suggest some kind of professional mining operation must already have been in operation by this time. Bulwell stone was later also used to repair the damage caused to the palaces of Westminster during the Second World War.

Coal is also found in abundance close to Bulwell. Running as part of much larger seams criss-crossing the region, the coal lies underneath the layers of sandstone and is in places only a few feet beneath the surface. Coal mines in the area around Bulwell were therefore among the first in the county to operate on a commercial basis, with large-scale mining from around 1500 onward.

Men like of Sir Francis Willoughby made fortunes from the extraction of coal. This allowed Willoughby to build the extravagant Wollaton Hall. One of the world's first railway lines, completed in 1604 between nearby Strelley and Wollaton, was built by Willoughby's heir, to aid transportation of the coal from his mines. Horses and other beasts of burden would pull the rows of trucks filled with coal, with the rails acting as a guide and a smoother surface than the roads of the time.

The church on the hill overlooking Bulwell, built in 1849–1850, stands on the site of an original church dating back to the 13th century or earlier. Towering over most of north-east Nottingham, Bulwell Saint Mary the Virgin and All Souls can be seen from afar and its bells ring across the area each weekend.

=== 1600–1900 ===
In 1667, George Strelley "built a school for the educating and teaching [of] young children of the Inhabitants of the said Parish", a building that survives to this day, along with many other houses built at the time. It is now a private home, but retains many original features. An 1852 act of Parliament allowed a gas pipeline from Basford and the south to be extended and provide street lighting and commercial and domestic service that revolutionised life in the town.

The earliest supply of mains water did not arrive until 1877, to replace many local springs, wells and the river providing for the needs of business and domestic use. Before 1877, water-borne diseases were rife and the river water highly polluted by industry and sewage, leading to high rates of infant mortality in the region. The proportion of children dying before their fifth birthday decreased by over 75 percentage points in Bulwell between 1870 and 1890, although this brought overcrowding and further demand for overstretched services like housing. Health care again suffered through insanitary living conditions, but the population continued to grow fast.

In 1843, bad weather did irreparable damage to the earlier St Mary's Church. The architect of the present one was Henry Isaac Stevens. In 1885, a further church of St John the Divine in Quarry Road was consecrated.

==== Bulwell Hall ====
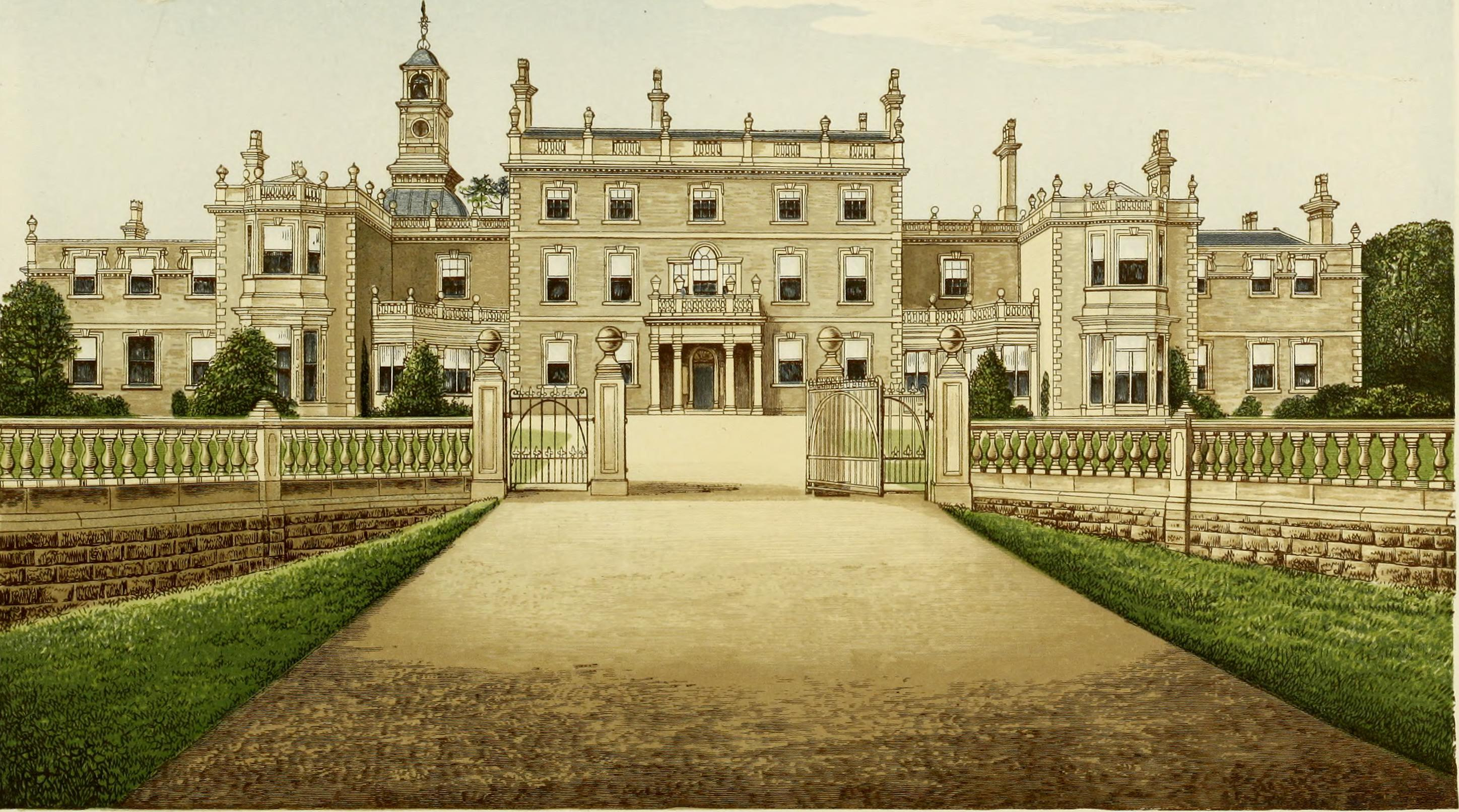
Bulwell Hall in 1879, from The County Seats of the Noblemen and Gentlemen of Great Britain and Ireland, by Francis Orpen Morris

Bulwell Hall was a mansion built in 1770 by the landowner John Newton, set in grounds to the north of Bulwell town centre and known initially as Pye Wipe Hall, a name that stuck locally. Passing to Newton's descendants, Bulwell Hall was sold at auction in 1864 to Samuel Thomas Cooper, along with over 1,000 acres (4.0 km^{2}) of land. It served variously as a sanatorium, an approved school for boys and an Italian prisoner of war camp before its demolition in 1956.

==== S.T. Cooper and the National School ====
The purchase of Bulwell Hall made Samuel Thomas Cooper a lord of the manor in and around Bulwell. Cooper was a philanthropist and paid £3,000 to build another school for local children in 1866; it served up to 518 children, a remarkable feat for the size of the building. Remaining in use as the old building of St Mary's CofE primary and nursery school primary school, it is now listed and serves far fewer pupils than when it was built. (See picture:)

After Cooper's death, his widow, Annie Cooper, donated £600 to Bulwell St Mary's for a better organ. Still in use, though now electrified, the organ houses a plaque marking her donation in memory of her husband. Some sources claim this was the same S.T. Cooper who later enclosed Bulwell Bogs as his own private ground. It is known that Cooper died in 1871, aged 39, and that the protest over the Bogs took place in 1872, but this does not preclude a protest taking place after his death for actions made whilst still alive. There is no other S.T. Cooper recorded as lord of the manor of Bulwell.

==== Civil parish ====
In 1891, the parish had a population of 11,481. On 1 April 1899, the parish was abolished and merged with Nottingham.

==== Boundary changes ====
The Deanery of Bulwell was founded in 1888, four years after the creation of the Diocese of Southwell. Bulwell remained a town in its own right until a boundary change in the 1890s placed it in the City of Nottingham. The ground floor of the 19th-century Old Town Hall is now a retail outlet for fireplaces. The long disused dance floor on the first floor has performed a variety of uses.

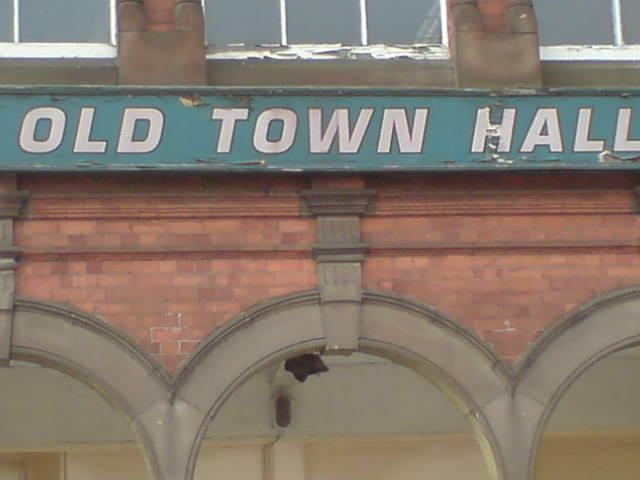

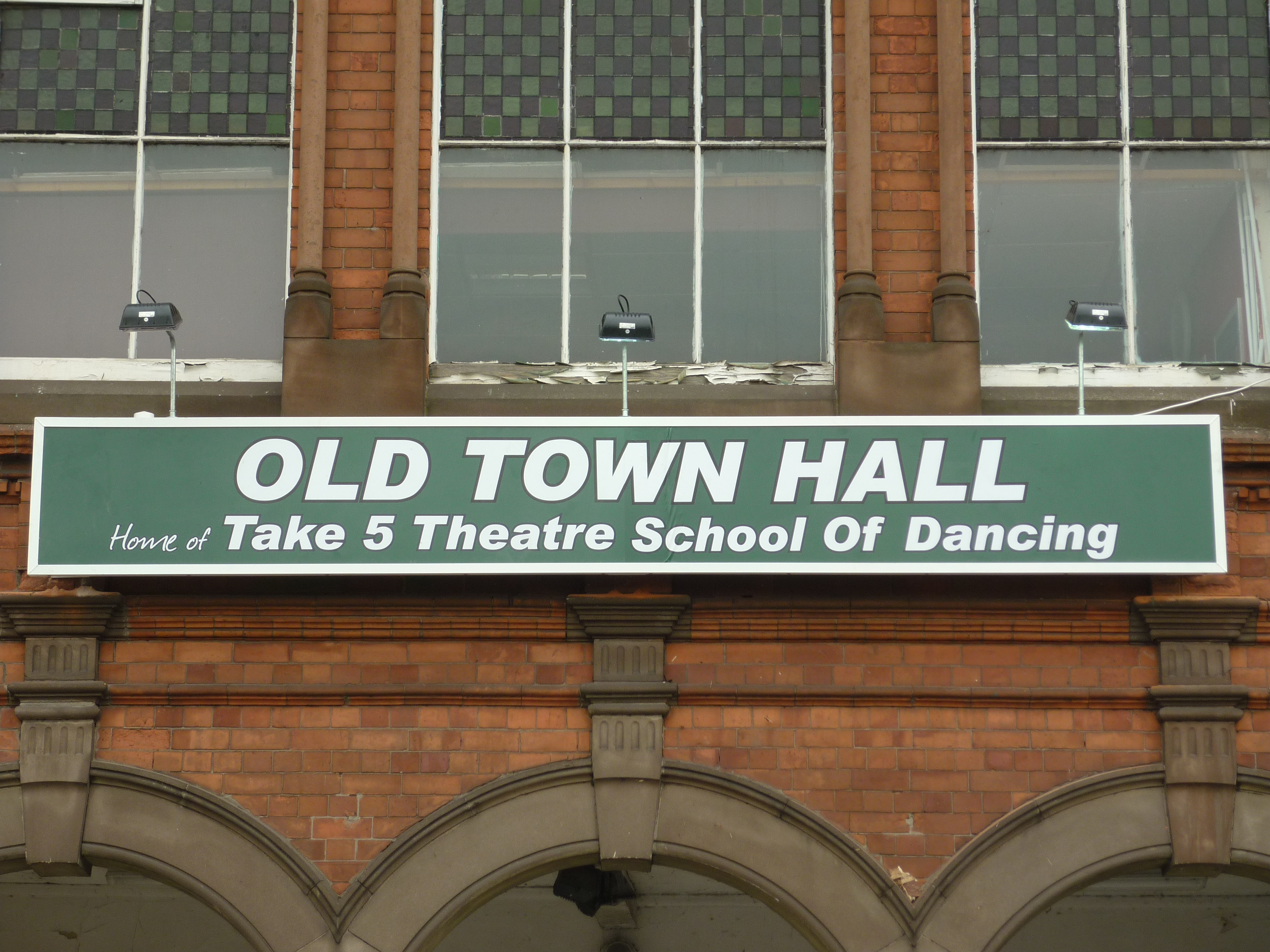

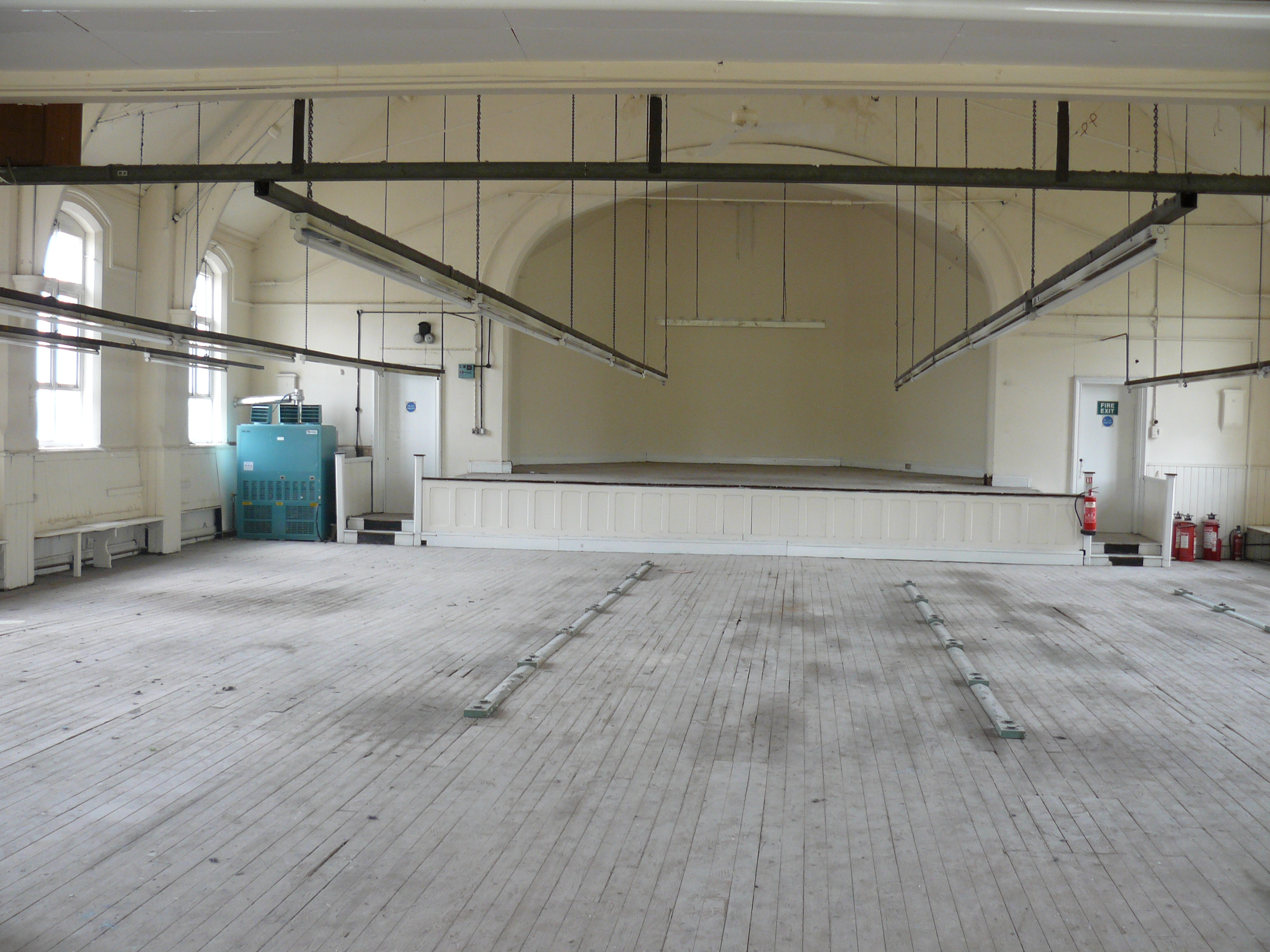

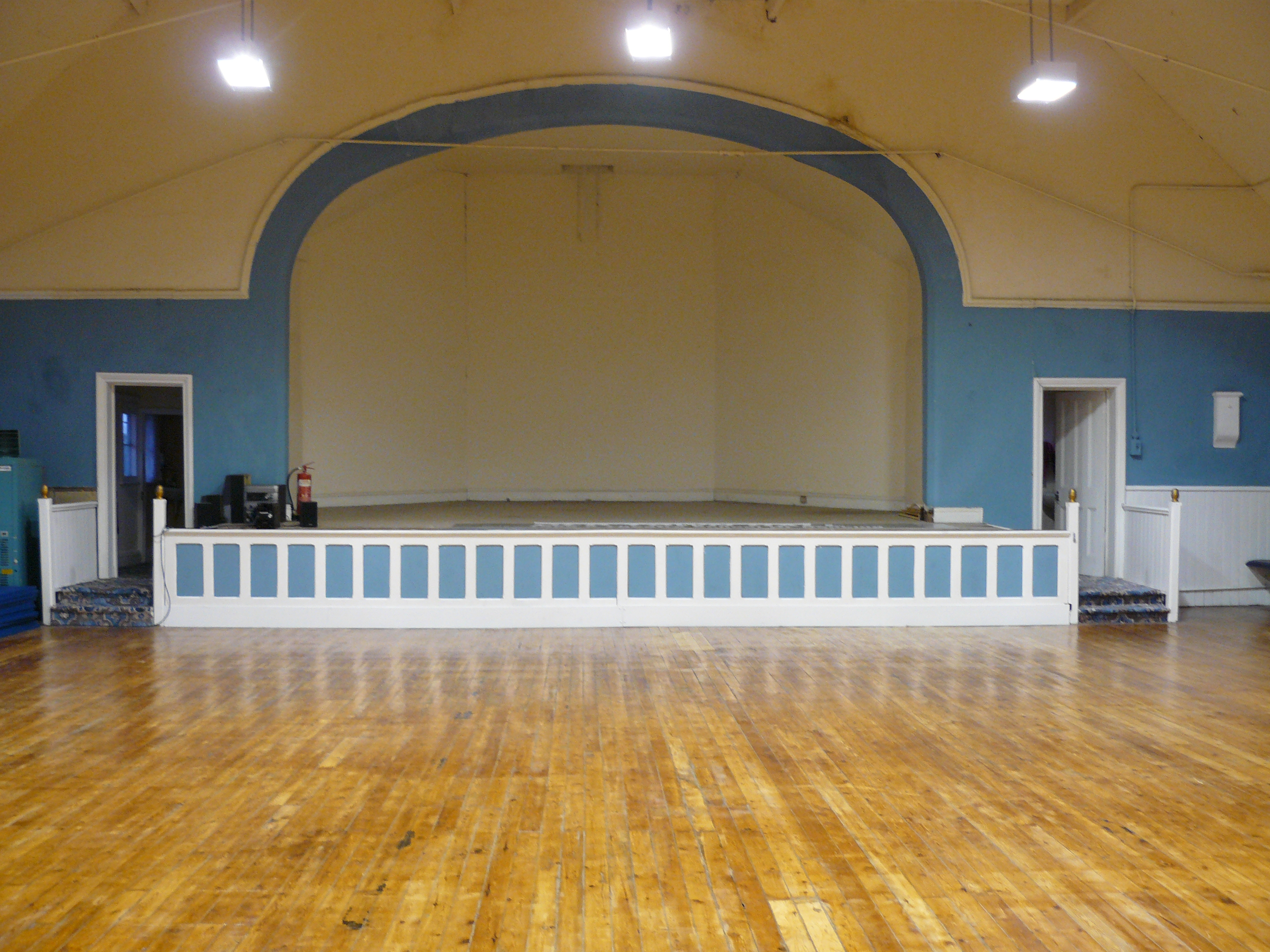

=== 1900–present ===
Over the past century, Bulwell has been much augmented by housing estates such as Crabtree Farm, Snape Wood, Highbury Vale and Hempshill Vale.

Snape Wood and Sellers Wood were parts of a swathe of woodland that bordered the landfill site to the north-west of Bulwell, stretching down to the farmland that became Hempshill Vale estate to the south-west. Both woods were protected under Royal Warrants dating back to the 12th century, but the drastic housing shortage in Bulwell in the 1960s and 1970s led to the protection being set aside.

A token remnant of Snape Wood, in the middle of the new estate, amounts to little more than a fenced copse with three pathways leading through it. Owned by the local authority, Nottingham City Council, the site was designated a local nature reserve, but years of neglect have left it rubbish-strewn and in need of a structured management plan. Despite the fly-tipping and lack of active conservation, the site surprisingly supports a wide variety of wildlife, from rare wildflowers to mammals such as grey squirrels, hedgehogs and urban foxes, and up to 20 different species of bird. In February 2009, plans to set up a community group to take on the maintenance and conservation of the site on behalf of the local authority were moved.

More of Sellers Wood remains, also with a local nature reserve, but actively managed by Nottinghamshire Wildlife Trust for the local authority. Sellers Wood was declared a Site of Special Scientific Interest by English Nature in 1981 as "a fine example of broad-leaved semi-natural woodland... of regional importance".

Bulwell no longer has a working quarry, landfill site, coal mine or brewery to employ its residents. Designated industrial areas, such as those found in Greasley Street and Commercial Road, were built in the latter half of the 20th century; these were followed in the 1980s and 1990s by smaller developments of offices and light industrial units, such as those in Pottery Way, off Sellers Wood Drive.

The larger developments for industry built in Sellers Wood in the 1980s (off Blenheim Lane, Camberley Road and Dabell Avenue) were augmented in the 1990s. Many other such buildings have sprung up in the surrounding area since and the area looks set to grow outwards once more in the near future. It includes warehousing and distribution for national food retailers, printing factories, office blocks of all sizes, and small to medium-sized units for various goods and services. A large Cash and Carry wholesalers recently joined the supermarket, petrol station and small row of fast-food outlets between this industrial estate and the rest of Bulwell. This utilises another piece of the land that was used for landfill until the 1960s–1970s, leaving only two large fields without any development.

Next to the supermarket is a precipitous slope, formed by the edges of a long-abandoned limestone quarry.

== Geography ==
Bordering the Ashfield and Broxtowe districts, "Greater" Bulwell has an area of some 3.5 square miles, though many argue its catchment area still includes the Bestwood, Bestwood Park, Heathfield and Leen Valley estates of the past, increasing the size to some five square miles. As designated by the city council, it includes Top Valley, Heron Ridge, Crabtree Farm, Bulwell Hall, Snape Wood, Sellers Wood, Highbury Vale, Hempshill Vale, Bulwell Forest, Bulwell Central, Moorbridge, the area entitled Bulwell Village and much of Rise Park.

Although the Bestwood estates were also originally suffixed Bulwell, ward and local-area boundaries have been changed to link the whole Greater Bestwood area with Basford and Sherwood. The seven fields between Bulwell and Bestwood have been largely developed, but the historic links between the areas remains. The newer estates covering the fields have just added to the satellite list.

=== Bulwell Bogs ===
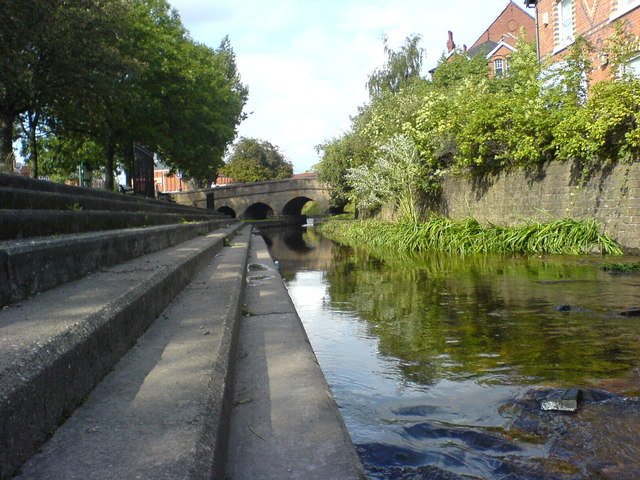
Bulwell Bogs

The centre of Bulwell lies in a valley along the River Leen. The Bog area beside the Leen, known for over 900 years as "Bulwell Bogs", has been set aside as a place for children to play, paddle and fish.

After an 1872 attempt by the lord of the manor to enclose the land around the Bogs, the people of Bulwell staged a peaceful protest, massing in hundreds to protect their common land. Described in the official records as "impeccably well behaved and peaceable to a man; indeed rather joyous of spirit!" the people of Bulwell marched a short distance before enjoying lunch by the river. Thereafter the crowd is said to have "dispersed quietly and as directed with no further disturbance," later winning the fight to designate the land for the "pleasure and leisure of the people of Bulwell".

The whole Bogs area was set to be demolished in 2002 to make way for a road bridge and transport interchange for buses, trams, taxis and trains. Fierce local opposition produced a campaign to prevent the plans, which the city council eventually scrapped. With help from local community groups and residents, the facilities at Bulwell Bogs were instead upgraded in 2003 to produce a bigger play-park, a safer paddling pool and a cleaner feel, and won a Green Flag Award in 2004 for work done to regenerate the area.

There is a further area about a mile upstream, near present-day Moorbridge, which used to attract children from miles around to play; this led to the nickname "Bulwell-on-Sea". The building of an outdoor Lido pool further encouraged families to travel across the city to spend a day by the water in Bulwell. Despite strong local opposition, the Lido was demolished in 2006 and the land sold off for private housing development.

== Transport ==
Bulwell is a transport hub for north Nottingham:

=== Tram ===
There are three stops in the town on the Nottingham Express Transit tram system: Bulwell, Bulwell Forest and Moor Bridge. These lie on Line 1, which links Hucknall to the north, Nottingham station and Toton Lane to the south.

=== Railway ===
Next to the tram stop is Bulwell railway station; East Midlands Railway operates services on the Robin Hood Line between Nottingham, Mansfield and Worksop.

=== Buses ===
The area is well served by the following bus operators and routes:

CT4N:

- 19: Bulwell, Top Valley, Bestwood Park, Arnold, Plains Estate, Mapperley, Sherwood Vale
- L14: Nottingham, Alfreton Road, Hyson Green, Perry Road, City Hospital, Basford, Bulwell.

Nottingham City Transport:

- 17: Nottingham, Hucknall Road, City Hospital, Bulwell.
- 35: Nottingham, QMC, Wollaton Vale, Bilborough, Strelley, Broxtowe, Cinderhill, Bulwell.
- 68/69: Nottingham, Sherwood Rise, Basford, Bulwell, Hempshill Vale, Snape Wood.
- 70/71: Nottingham, Sherwood Rise, Basford, Bagnall Road (70), Cinderhill (71), Bulwell, Norwich Gardens, Morrisons.
- 79: Nottingham, Nuthall Road, Aspley, Cinderhill, Bulwell, Rise Park, Top Valley, Bestwood Park, Arnold.

Nottsbus Connect:

- 528: Bestwood, Bulwell, Phoenix Park, Moorgreen, Selston.

Trent Barton:

- 3A/B/C The Threes: Nottingham, Sutton, Mansfield.

== Education ==
Schools around Bulwell have long been among the UK's worst performers. The whole Bulwell area was designated an Education Action Zone in 1999, under a scheme to address the problems. Standards have risen since, but deficiencies persist. The north Nottingham region has the UK's lowest level of students progressing to higher education. The 2006–2007 league tables for secondary education showed Nottingham schools to be the country's second worst achievers.

Marcia Puckey, head of Hempshill Hall Primary before she retired in the summer of 2005, was the longest-serving school head in Britain. She received an OBE for her services to education in the Queen's New Year's Honours List 2006.

Bulwell's flagship new school, The Bulwell Academy, was officially opened in September 2009, with all pupils from the former Henry Mellish School and the former Alderman Derbyshire School (later River Leen School) moving into the new building by August 2010.

== Amenities ==
Bulwell has a library, a swimming pool, many churches and fast food restaurants.

There are also two golf courses, a youth club, a police station and a Tudor-style arcade hidden down an alleyway off the Market Place.

The town has many community-based initiatives to improve the area, with local volunteers playing a role. The Bulwell Credit Union, One Vision Partnership (OVP) and the active Brownies, Girl Guides, Rainbows and Cubs packs, the Bulwell and Basford Rotary Club and Bulwell Community Toy Library are just a few of these.

There is a site for travellers of Irish heritage in Bulwell; it is one of only a few permanent sites in the country to cater for both traveller and static populations. Much has been done by nearby schools to integrate traveller children – work that has won praise from police, community leaders and travellers' rights groups.

== Life in Bulwell ==
The Scots' Grey public house, now closed, featured in a television programme on The Ten Hardest Pubs in Britain. Housing a successful boxing club, it provided champion boxers such as Dominic Wilmot in 2008 and Aaron Brenton in 2009, and trained hundreds of amateur boxers for generations. However, its reputation for toughness comes as much from fights outside the ring as in it and stretches back many years. Fights were regularly held in the nearby Market Place after closing time on Saturday night, with scores being settled and money made or lost on the outcomes. Spectators formed a ring around the bare-knuckle fighters, who would fight until a knock-out. Betting, challenging (i.e. money offered to any man able to knock down the "hero") and "purses" offered by crowds were regular sidelines to the fights, which continued into the 1990s. The pub was closed because it was seen as too "rough" to control and now houses a Barnardo's charity shop.

Despite the closure, the pub's football team, The Scots' Grey F.C., continue to play in the local Sunday League. It won all three senior trophies in Nottinghamshire for two years running, as the first team to accomplish the feat.

=== Crime ===
Crime levels are high in the area, compared to Nottingham and national averages. In January 2003, Bulwell gained national attention after a Nottingham police constable, Ged Walker, was killed in the line of duty. Walker was dragged to his death as he tried to arrest the driver of a stolen taxi. Local drug addict David Parfitt was later sentenced to 13 years for manslaughter. A memorial stone, marking the spot where PC Walker died, was vandalised in January 2006, with a hammer being used to deface and damage the engravings.

Another officer was badly injured in a similar incident on 10 October 2006. The special constable required extensive reconstructive surgery after being dragged along the road by a car when trying to arrest a man on Bulwell Hall estate. Four people were arrested.

The fatal shooting of local man Marvin Bradshaw outside a Bulwell pub in 2003, led to gangland-style reprisal attacks that attracted international interest. A passenger in the car Bradshaw had been driving on the night of his murder, whilst unhurt in the attack, himself died within months of the event, leading friends and family members to seek revenge on his behalf. The mother and stepfather of Michael O'Brien, the man convicted of Bradshaw's murder, were targeted, despite moving into a "safe house" on the Lincolnshire coast; they were both murdered soon after.

O'Brien had been sentenced to 24 years in prison for Bradshaw's murder. Three of the eight men arrested on charges of conspiracy to murder John and Joan Stirland, O'Brien's mother and stepfather, were found guilty, in a case still being investigated by the Independent Police Complaints Commission. "Extremely serious matters" are said to have been found in the way the police handled it. It has been shown that corrupt police officers passed information to gang boss Colin Gunn about the time of the murders. Gunn received a sentence of 35 years for conspiracy to murder the Stirlands and a further nine years for bribery and corruption of police officers. He was implicated and arrested, but never charged with the murder of Marian Bates, a jeweller.

On 1 July 2006, the day after the three were sentenced for the Stirlands' murders, a riot broke out on the Bestwood estate, the former home of Gunn and his gang. Lasting several hours and causing an estimated £10,000 worth of damage, the riots were said to have been triggered by the outcome of the murder trial. Nine people were convicted over the disturbances.

On 7 August 2006, an 18-year-old local died after an attack outside the Moon & Stars pub: Aaron Smith suffered severe head injuries in the attack, which occurred on 3 August. A local 24-year-old man, Jordan Carter, pleaded guilty to Smith's manslaughter. Another local man was shot in the neck and back outside the Lord Nelson in November 2006, then abducted, tied up, driven to a country road and left for dead. Three people were arrested and bailed in connection with the crime, which left the 27-year-old victim from Aspley with serious injuries.

== In popular culture ==
Bulwell is the setting for the online comedy series Charity Shop Sue (2019). It was created by Matthew Chesney, Timothy Chesney, and Stuart Edwards, and was directed and produced by them alongside Vicky McClure and Shane Meadows. The series, a mockumentary, follows Sue Tuke (played by Selina Mosinski as the manager of a fictional charity shop on Bulwell Main Street.

== Notable people ==
- Albert Ball (1896–1917), First World War Royal Flying Corps pilot and air ace awarded the Victoria Cross, the Military Cross and the Croix de Guerre before dying in battle aged 20
- John Bird (1936–2022), satirist, actor and comedian, educated at High Pavement Grammar School.
- Brothers Jason Booth (born 1977) and Nicky Booth (born 1980), boxers holding concurrent British and Commonwealth titles at Flyweight and Bantamweight respectively, attended Henry Mellish School.
- Stephen Brown (born 1948), composer, conductor and teacher
- Emily Campbell (born 1994), olympic weightlifter
- Steve Chettle (born 1968), former football player for Nottingham Forest, educated at Alderman Derbyshire School (which was on the site of what is now Bulwell Academy)
- Neil Cossons (born 1939), former director of the Science Museum and chairman of English Heritage, educated at Henry Mellish School
- Les Leston (also known as Alfred Lazarus Fingleston, 1920–2012), Grand Prix-winning F1 driver
- Bertie Mee (1918–2001), association football player and manager of Arsenal for their first ever Double win
- Georgie Mee (1900–1978), footballer, older brother of Bertie
- Stanley Middleton (1919–2009), Booker Prize-winning novelist and grammar school teacher
- Selina Mosinski, manager of fictional shop Sec*hand Chances
- Wilfrid Reid (1884–1973), professional golfer and golf-course designer
- Malcolm Starkey (born 1936), English footballer
- John White (1855-unknown), cricketer.

== See also ==
- Listed buildings in Nottingham (Bulwell ward)
