= Notts TV =

Local television channel in Nottingham, United Kingdom

- Country: United Kingdom
- Broadcast area: Nottinghamshire
- Headquarters: Confetti Media Group, Antenna building, Beck Street, Nottingham

Programming
- Language: English
- Picture format: 576i (16:9, SDTV)

Ownership
- Owner: Notts TV Limited
- Parent: Nottingham Trent University

History
- Founded: 9 April 2014
- Launched: 27 May 2014
- Closed: 29 August 2025

Links
- Website: Notts TV

Availability

Streaming media
- Notts TV On Demand: Watch Notts TV On Demand

Notts TV was a British commercial local television channel broadcasting to the city of Nottingham and the surrounding areas via Freeview on channel 7 from the Nottingham relay TV transmitter which is transmitted via the Waltham transmitter which also broadcast the station.

Notts TV was owned and most of its programming was produced by a consortium of four Nottingham based media-related organisations: Nottingham Trent University (NTU), Nottingham Post, Confetti Media Group and Inclusive Digital. Other local independent producers contributed content.

As of September 2025, its website is dormant with some past-programming available via an on-demand section.

== History ==
Ofcom granted the channel a 12-year licence.

Notts TV launched on 27 May 2014 on Freeview channel 7 followed by Virgin channel 159.

From opening in 2014, the BBC contributed to the funding of Notts TV for the first three years.

In July 2015, the channel also became available on Sky channel 117; the carriage ended in September 2017.

In April 2016, Notts TV moved to channel 7 on Freeview (the number previously occupied by BBC Three which closed as a linear channel the month before).

On 17 February 2025, the station's parent organisation, NTU, announced it would not renew its licence, valid until 25 November 2025, due to insufficient students undertaking training, and would shut down. At the time of the decision, the channel had an average staff of nine. OFCOM confirmed the window for continuation licence applications would close on 31 March 2025. On 21 August 2025, the channel announced that it would shut down earlier than anticipated on 29 August due to loss of key personnel.

The channel closed at 12:00AM on 30 August 2025 during its commercial break. A repeat of the final edition of Notts Today aired on the channel as its actual final programme but only its first part aired prior to the closedown as the commercial break suddenly cut to a closedown slide at 12:00AM stating that it had stopped broadcasting after 11 years on air. The channel’s final programme aired in full beforehand was an edition of Splendour 2025. Archived content from the channel's 11 years on air will continue on its YouTube channel.
