= Listed buildings in Nottingham (Mapperley ward) =

Mapperley is an electoral ward in the city of Nottingham, England. The ward contains 24 listed buildings that are recorded in the National Heritage List for England. Of these, one is listed at Grade II*, the middle of the three grades, and the others are at Grade II, the lowest grade. The ward is a mainly residential area to the north of the city centre. Most of the listed buildings are houses and associated structures, and the others include churches and a vicarage, a former lodge, three boundary markers, a former hospital chapel and theatre, and a former cinema.

== Key ==
Grade	Criteria
II*	Particularly important buildings of more than special interest
II	Buildings of national importance and special interest

== Buildings ==
Name and location	Photograph	Date	Notes	Grade
Mapperley Hall; 52.97427°N 1.14322°W	—	1792	A country house that was extended in 1845 and in 1889–90 and later divided, it is stuccoed, on a plinth, with stone dressings, floor bands, an eaves cornice and blocking course, and hipped slate roofs. There are three storeys, five bays, and two parallel rear wings flanking a courtyard. The garden front has a slightly projecting centre under a pediment, and a double flight of steps with a balustrade leading up to a landing. On the front is a portico with pilasters and an entablature, above it is a Venetian window with a cornice and a balcony on brackets, and the other windows are sashes. To the right is a screen wall with Doric columns. On the left return are two bay windows, one canted, the other square. At the rear is a square service wing with a pyramidal roof, linked by a curved corridor.	II
St Andrew's House, coach house and wall 52.96475°N 1.15223°W		c. 1840	A house that was remodelled in 1886, including the addition of a coach house, by Watson Fothergill, and later used as offices. It is in red brick on a plinth, with dressings in blue brick and stone, floor bands, and tile roofs, the gables with arched bargeboards. There are two storeys and attics, and a front of two bays. On the right is a full-height canted bay window with timber framing in the attic, and a hipped roof. On the left corner is a round tourelle with a spire roof and a finial. Most of the windows are sashes with segmental heads. At the left is a single-storey extension with a timber-framed porch and a triangular bay window. The coach house has two storeys and a large through-eaves dormer, and the boundary wall is in brick with gabled coping.	II
196 and 198 Mansfield Road; 52.96445°N 1.15202°W		c. 1850	A pair of houses, later offices, they are stuccoed, on a plinth, with an eaves cornice and a slate roof. There are three storeys and four bays. In the middle bays are sash windows with moulded surrounds. The outer bays are flanked by pilasters under open pediments, and contain doorways with moulded surrounds and cornices, above which are round-arched windows.	II
200 and 202 Mansfield Road; 52.96461°N 1.15211°W		c. 1850	A pair of houses, later offices, they are stuccoed, on a plinth, with wooden eaves and a hipped slate roof. There are three storeys and four bays, and recessed flanking porches. In the middle bays are sash windows with moulded surrounds. The outer bays are flanked by pilasters, and contain round-arched windows. The porches contain a doorway with a fanlight, above which is a round-arched window.	II
14 Mapperley Road; 52.96529°N 1.15073°W	—	Mid 19th century	The house, which was extended in 1887 by Watson Fothergill, is in red brick, the ground floor rendered, with dressings in stone and terracotta, and hipped slate and tile roofs. It is in two and three storeys, and has a main range of three bays. On the left of the front is a square three-storey tower with a pyramidal roof and a finial. To its right are two two-storey canted bay windows, between which are casement windows, one in the upper floor set in applied timber framing with brick nogging, and a doorway with a moulded surround and a sloping hood on brackets. On the right return is an octagonal tower with a spire roof.	II
Forest Lodge; 52.96643°N 1.15386°W		1857	The former lodge to the racecourse, now the Forest Recreation Ground, was designed by Henry Moses Wood In Greek Revival style. It is stuccoed, on a plinth, with an entablature on all sides, lead coped parapets, and a slate roof. There is a single storey, and a cruciform plan with a tetrastyle Doric portico and a pediment on each side. The windows are sashes with moulded surrounds. At the rear is a blocked door with an Egyptian architrave.	II
45 Mapperley Road; 52.96813°N 1.14678°W	—	c. 1865	The house is in stone, with a timber-framed upper storey, on a plinth, with patterned slate roofs and a truncated flèche. There are two storeys and a cruciform plan with three bays, and the windows are casements. The entrance front has a projecting gable, a two-light window with a pointed arch, and a porch. The street front has a truncated gable and a four-light window.	II
Boundary wall, 43 and 45 Mapperley Road; 52.96805°N 1.14679°W	—	c. 1865	The wall is in stone with a blue lias band, and moulded ramped coping. On the right is a square pier with a plinth and rebated corners.	II
Boundary marker by 52 Redcliffe Road; 52.96928°N 1.14845°W		1869	The boundary marker is in cast iron with a semicircular section and a domed top. On the top are inscribed the name of the town and its coat of arms, and on the body are the names of the mayor, the sheriff, the foreman and the town clerk, and the date.	II
Boundary marker at junction of Redcliffe Road with Mansfield Road; 52.96920°N 1.15358°W		1869	The boundary marker is in cast iron with a semicircular section and a domed top, and is about 1 metre (3 ft 3 in) high. On the top are inscribed the name of the town, its coat of arms and the date, and on the body are the names of the mayor and the sheriff.	II
Boundary marker at junction of Redcliffe Road with Mapperley Road; 52.96910°N 1.14486°W		1869	The boundary marker is in cast iron with a semicircular section and a domed top. On the top are inscribed the name of the town and its coat of arms, and on the body are the names of the mayor, the sheriff, the foreman and the town clerk, and the date.	II
St Andrew's Church and wall 52.96505°N 1.15240°W		1869–71	The church was designed by William Knight, and the baptistry was added in 1884 by S. R. Stevenson. The church is built in stone with dressings in limestone and blue lias, and has slate roofs. There is a cruciform plan, consisting of a nave with a clerestory, a west baptistry, north and south aisles, north and south porches, north and south transepts, a chancel with side chapels and a vestry, and a steeple at the crossing. The steeple has a two-stage tower, large bell openings with shafts, tourelles with arcaded turrets and spires, and a broach spire with two tiers of lucarnes. The churchyard is enclosed by a stone wall with chamfered coping, and it contains a gateway to the south with a wrought iron lamp bracket.	II*
St Andrew's Vicarage; 52.96536°N 1.15208°W	—	1871	The vicarage, designed by William Knight, is in red brick on a plinth, with dressings in blue brick and stone, polychrome bands, and slate roofs with coped gables. There are two storeys and attics, a double range plan, three bays, and a rear wing. On the street front, the middle bay projects under a gable, and contains a doorway with a pointed-arched head and a hood mould. Most of the windows have pointed-arched heads and some are shouldered. In the left return is a bay window, and at the rear is a porch with a hipped roof.	II
Malvern House and wall 52.96798°N 1.14763°W		1874	The house is in sandstone on a plinth, with moulded eaves, and slate roofs with coped gables. There are two storeys and attics, and fronts of three and five bays. Most of the windows are sashes with mullions. In the centre is a porch with a traceried parapet and a pointed-arched opening with shafts, and a doorway with a fanlight. Above it is a two-light window and a dormer with a four-light window. Over this is a tower with modillion eaves, and a pyramidal roof with a cast iron crest. The right bay contains a two-storey bow window with a trefoil-arched frieze and a conical tower. The left bay is gabled, and contains a square bay window with a pediment containing a monogram, above which are a pair of segmental-arched windows flanking a statue, a sundial, and a three-light window. The courtyard wall is coped, and contains gate and intermediate piers with pyramidal caps and ball finials.	II
Gate piers and wall, Malvern House; 52.96792°N 1.14718°W		1874	Flanking the entrance to the drive are two square sandstone gate piers, each with chamfered corners, a polychrome band, shafts in the upper stage, and an elaborate cross-gabled cap surmounted by a ringed cast iron lamp standard, the lamp missing. Outside there are smaller simpler gate piers flanking the pedestrian entrances. The boundary wall is in stone with chamfered coping, and extends for about 30 metres (98 ft).	II
Lamp standard, Malvern House; 52.96800°N 1.14725°W	—	c. 1874	The lamp standard in the grounds of the house is in cast iron. It has a square base, a baluster stem entwined with dolphins, a tapered upper stem with a leaf base, and a moulded ladder rest. The lamp is missing.	II
43 Mapperley Road and wall 52.96809°N 1.14694°W		1875–76	The house is in stone on a plinth, the upper floor timber framed with plaster infill, with stone dressings, and a patterned slate roof with a tile crest and gables with bargeboards. There are two storeys, two bays and a later rear extension. In the centre is a doorway with a pointed arch and a moulded surround. To the left is a gabled wing with a canted ground floor, containing a casement window with a pointed arch and tracery in the tympanum. Elsewhere, there are casement windows with pointed arches, and a raking dormer. At the rear is a two-stage octagonal turret, the upper stage timber framed, with hipped gables and a conical lead roof. The boundary wall to the east is in stone with chamfered coping.	II
Chapel and theatre, Mapperley Hospital; 52.97883°N 1.12516°W		1887	The former hospital chapel and theatre were designed by G. T. Hine. They are in red brick on a moulded stone plinth, with stone dressings, a dentilled cornice, and slate roofs with stone coped gables and kneelers. On the southwest gable is a bellcote. Most of the windows are mullioned and transomed with segmental heads, and there are windows with pointed-arched heads and a wheel window. At the top of the central buttress is a gabled niche.	II
208 Mansfield Road; 52.96581°N 1.15279°W		c. 1893	A red brick house on a plinth, with dressings in brick and stone, string courses and a tile roof. There are two storeys and attics, and two bays. The left bay projects and is gabled, and has a canted bay window in the ground floor, and timber framing with brick nogging in the gable. On the right is a round corner tower with a conical spire roof and a finial. Most of the windows are sashes with mullions and transoms. The entrance front on the right has a doorway with sidelights and a glazed canopy on brackets, to its right is a triangular bay window, and in the left return is a segmental-headed stair window.	II
Tufa arch and rockery, 208 Mansfield Road; 52.96568°N 1.15276°W	—	c. 1893	In the garden to the south of the house is an irregular rock arch spanning the path, which is linked on the south side to an irregular mass of natural rock below a cliff face. The cliff was formerly the working face of a sand quarry, with mine entrances below, and it has been adapted as a garden feature.	II
Church of Christ Scientist and wall 52.96432°N 1.15188°W		1898	Originally a Congregational church designed by Brewill and Baily, it is in stone with stone slate roofs, and consists of a nave with a clerestory, north and south aisles, north and south porches, a meeting room and a southwest tower. The tower has three stages, angle buttresses, and a segmental-arched recess on the south containing two doorways. Above are two mullioned windows, six-light flat-headed bell openings, and a shaped embattled parapet with corner pinnacles. The boundary wall is in brick with stone coping, and facing the entrance is a gateway with a wrought iron overthrow.	II
Beech Wood; 52.96843°N 1.14525°W		1904	A house designed by Watson Fothergill and Lawrence Summers in red brick on a plinth, with dressings in blue brick and stone, a floor band, some timber framing with brick nogging, and tile roofs. There are two storeys and attics, and fronts of three bays. On the street front is a central round-arched doorway with a fanlight. The left bay projects and is gabled, and contains a canted bay window with a hipped roof, above which is a through-eaves dormer and timber framing. On the right corner is a two-stage turret, the lower stage canted, and the upper stage timber framed and jettied, with a conical spire roof. In the right return is a through-eaves dormer, and on the right corner is an angled bay window.	II
Boundary wall, Beech Wood; 52.96833°N 1.14545°W		1904	The wall enclosing the garden on two sides was designed by Watson Fothergill. It is in stone with coping, and each side extends for about 35 metres (115 ft), with a rounded corner. Opposite the main entrance is a gateway, and at the end is a pier with a square cap.	II
Former Majestic Cinema; 52.98055°N 1.13033°W		1929	The cinema was designed by Alfred John Thraves, and has since been used for other purposes. It is brick, with render on the front in rough semicircles, and has a pantile roof at the front, and a flat roof over the auditorium. At the front are three bays, the middle bay recessed with an entrance, above which is a loggia. Each outer bay has a brick plinth, moulded cornices, overhanging eaves, and a hipped roof. They each contain three narrow vertical recesses with windows at the top and the bottom.	II
