= Over the Wall =

Over the Wall may refer to:

- Over the Wall (charity), a charity providing camps for seriously ill children in the UK
- "Over the Wall" (song), a single by Echo & the Bunnymen
- "Over the Wall", song by Testament from the album The Legacy, 1987
- Over the Wall (band), a Glasgow-based pop band
- Over the Wall (film), a 1938 film
- Over the Wall (short film), a 1944 film
- Over the Wall (novel), a 2000 novel by John H. Ritter

== See also ==
- Over the Garden Wall (disambiguation)
- The Wall (disambiguation)
