= Page Hannah =

American actress

- Born: Chicago, Illinois, U.S.
- Other name: Page Adler
- Occupations: Actress; philanthropist
- Years active: 1981–1994; 2017–2018
- Spouse: Lou Adler (m. 1992)
- Children: 4
- Relatives: Daryl Hannah (sister); Tanya Wexler (half-sister)

Page Adler (née Hannah) is an American philanthropist and former actress.

== Life and career ==
Hannah was born in Chicago, Illinois. She is married to producer Lou Adler, and the couple have four sons. She is the younger sister of actress Daryl Hannah. Other relatives include Tanya Wexler, Haskell Wexler, Yale Wexler, and Don Wexler.

In 1999, Hannah and her husband founded The Painted Turtle Camp in Lake Hughes, California, with Paul Newman. The camp is part of the Hole in the Wall Gang Camp network founded by Newman. The camp's programs give children with life-threatening illnesses and chronic medical conditions the opportunity to experience traditional camping experiences. The camp also has an outreach program that visits hospitals in the greater Los Angeles area. Hannah is currently chairman of the organization's board of directors.

== Filmography ==
=== Film ===
Year	Title	Role	Notes
1981	On the Right Track	Sally	
1984	Racing with the Moon	High School Girl	
1985	My Man Adam	Sabrina McKay	
1986	My Little Girl	Angela	
1987	Creepshow 2	Rachel	Segment: "The Raft"
1988	The In Crowd	Lydia	
1988	After School	Annie	
1989	Shag	Luanne	
1990	Gremlins 2: The New Batch	Tour Guide #1	
1994	Whit & Charm		
2017	The Landing	Sandy Cunningham-Bates	
2018	Paradox	Lady	Credited as Page Adler

=== Television ===
Year	Title	Role	Notes
1984–1985	Search for Tomorrow	Adair McCleary	4 episodes
1986	Fame	Kate Riley	8 episodes
1986	Spenser: For Hire	Laura Findley	Episode: "White Knight"
1988	Monsters	Maura Warren	Episode: "The Vampire Hunter"
1989	Freddy's Nightmares	Emily	Episode: "Deadline"
1989	Murder, She Wrote	Sybil Reed	Episode: "The Sins of Castle Cove"
1997	Muppets Tonight	Herself	Episode: "Johnny Fiama Leaves Home"
2011	The Apprentice	Herself	Episode: "Unhappy Campers"; Credited as Page Adler
