= Listed buildings in Nottingham (Bulwell ward) =

Bulwell is a former electoral ward in the city of Nottingham, England. The ward contained 14 listed buildings that are recorded in the National Heritage List for England. All the listed buildings are designated at Grade II, the lowest of the three grades, which is applied to "buildings of national importance and special interest". The ward contains the village of Bulwell and the surrounding area. The listed buildings include houses, cottages and associated structures, farmhouses and farm buildings, two bridges, a school, a church and a cemetery chapel.

== Buildings ==
Name and location	Photograph	Date	Notes
Strelley House; 53.00214°N 1.19808°W		1667–69	The house, which has been altered and extended, is in red brick on a stone plinth, with blue brick diapering and moulded brick dressings, the rear wing is in stone, and to the east is a later rendered extension. The roofs are tiled and have moulded shaped gables, and most of the windows are casements. There are two storeys and four bays. On the front is a two-storey tower porch with string courses and a shaped gable. In the ground floor are three rusticated round-arched openings with an impost band, and above is a coat of arms in painted terracotta.
Bulwell Dovecote; 53.00168°N 1.19823°W		Late 17th century	The dovecote is in stone, and has a pantile roof with stepped brick coped gables and kneelers. There are two storeys, an L-shaped plan, and a single storey. The dovecote contains a doorway flanked by windows, and above is a flight hole with a shelf. Inside there are nesting boxes with round-arched openings.
Blenheim Farmhouse and barn 53.00908°N 1.21807°W	—	Early 18th century	The farmhouse and barn are in limestone with tile roofs. The farmhouse has two storeys and attics, and three bays. There is a central porch, and a doorway with a hood on brackets. The windows are casements with wedge lintels. The barn to the right has a stable door with a stone wedge lintel. In the gable end is a small fixed window flanked by stable doorways with wooden lintels. Above is a pair of ledges, between which is a panel containing pigeon openings.
Barn and stable range, Hempshill Hall Farm; 52.99182°N 1.21870°W		Mid 18th century	The farm buildings have roofs of slate and pantile. The threshing barn is in brick, with coped gables and kneelers, and has four bays. It contains threshing doors, a small window, and vents. To the north is a single-story outbuilding, and to the south is a stone stable range with two storeys, containing stable doors, vents, a hayloft opening, and an external stairway. Attached to the northeast is a single-storey stable and cartshed with a pair of cart openings.
Bagnall Cottages and wall 52.99087°N 1.19977°W		c. 1800	A row of former miners' cottages in stone, with brick dressings, and a pantile roof with a Staffordshire blue tile margin. There are two storeys and five bays. On the front are three gabled porches with blue tile roofs, and the windows are casements with rendered lintels. To the right is a curved boundary wall in coped stone, extending for about 5 metres (16 ft).
Former barn and stable, Strelley House; 53.00228°N 1.19793°W	—	c. 1800	The outbuildings, later used for other purposes, are in stone with pantile roofs. The former barn has four bays, and contains casement windows and blocked doorways. The stable to the left is lower, and has full-width board doors with a central pier and a common lintel.
Stone bridge 53.00008°N 1.19625°W		1833	The bridge carries Station Road over the River Leen. It consists of five pointed segmental arches with keystones, the central arch the largest. The bridge has a string course, balustrade walls with gabled coping, and square piers with square domed caps. The corners are rounded.
Stable at Blenheim Farmhouse; 53.00914°N 1.21793°W	—	Mid 19th century	The stable is in limestone with a pantile roof, and has two storeys and three bays. There is a central stable door flanked by windows, all with segmental stone lintels, and above is a hayloft door.
Garden wall, Strelley House; 53.00199°N 1.19813°W	—	Mid 19th century	The garden wall is in rock-faced Bulwell stone with rubble coping. The south range extends for about 70 metres (230 ft) and contains a gateway with square piers and a wrought iron gate, and the west range is about 40 metres (130 ft) long and contains a pair of wooden gates.
Stable Range, Bulwell Hall; 53.01596°N 1.20992°W		1865	The stable range to the demolished house is now a ruin. It is in stone on a plinth, with a sill band, and the windows were sashes. There are two storeys and nine bays. The front is symmetrical with a projecting centre and end bays, and at the rear are buildings surrounding a yard. In the centre of the front is a round-arched carriage entrance with a moulded surround, shafts and a dated double keystone. Above the entrance is a Venetian window with chamfered corners, and there is another Venetian window in the right end bay.
St Mary's School and walls 53.00488°N 1.19402°W		1866–67	The school, designed by R. C. Sutton, is in stone on a plinth, with quoins, buttresses, a string course, and artificial slate roofs. There is a single storey, seven bays, and two parallel ranges. On the left is a gabled cross-wing, and on the roof at the crossing is a truncated turret. On the right is a gabled projection and a gabled porch. The windows contain Geometrical tracery, and on the roof are gabled ventilators. The grounds are enclosed by a boundary wall in coped stone containing, on Main Street, a gateway with a pair of square piers with pyramidal caps.
Iron Footbridge; 52.99919°N 1.19661°W		c. 1880	The footbridge crossing the River Leen is in wrought iron, and consists of a single segmental arch with a span of about 5 metres (16 ft). It has riveted lattice balustrades with overhung curved brackets.
Church of St John the Divine; 53.00378°N 1.20453°W		1882–85	The church, which was designed by William Knight, is in Bulwell stone with blue lias dressings and tile roofs. It consists of a nave with a clerestory, north and south aisles, a north porch, north and south transepts, and a chancel with an apse. There are round windows in the transepts and at the west end.
Chapel, Northern Cemetery; 52.99927°N 1.20934°W		1902–03	The cemetery chapel is in stone with slate roofs, and consists of a nave, a south aisle, a chancel, a vestry, a west porch and a southwest steeple. The steeple has a tower with three stages, angle buttresses, pointed arched doorways on the north and south sides, slit lights, three-light bell openings, and a broach spire with gabled lucarnes. The porch has angle buttresses and a coped parapet.
