= Jordan River Village =

Vacation village in Israel for children with life-limiting conditions

- כפר נהר הירדן
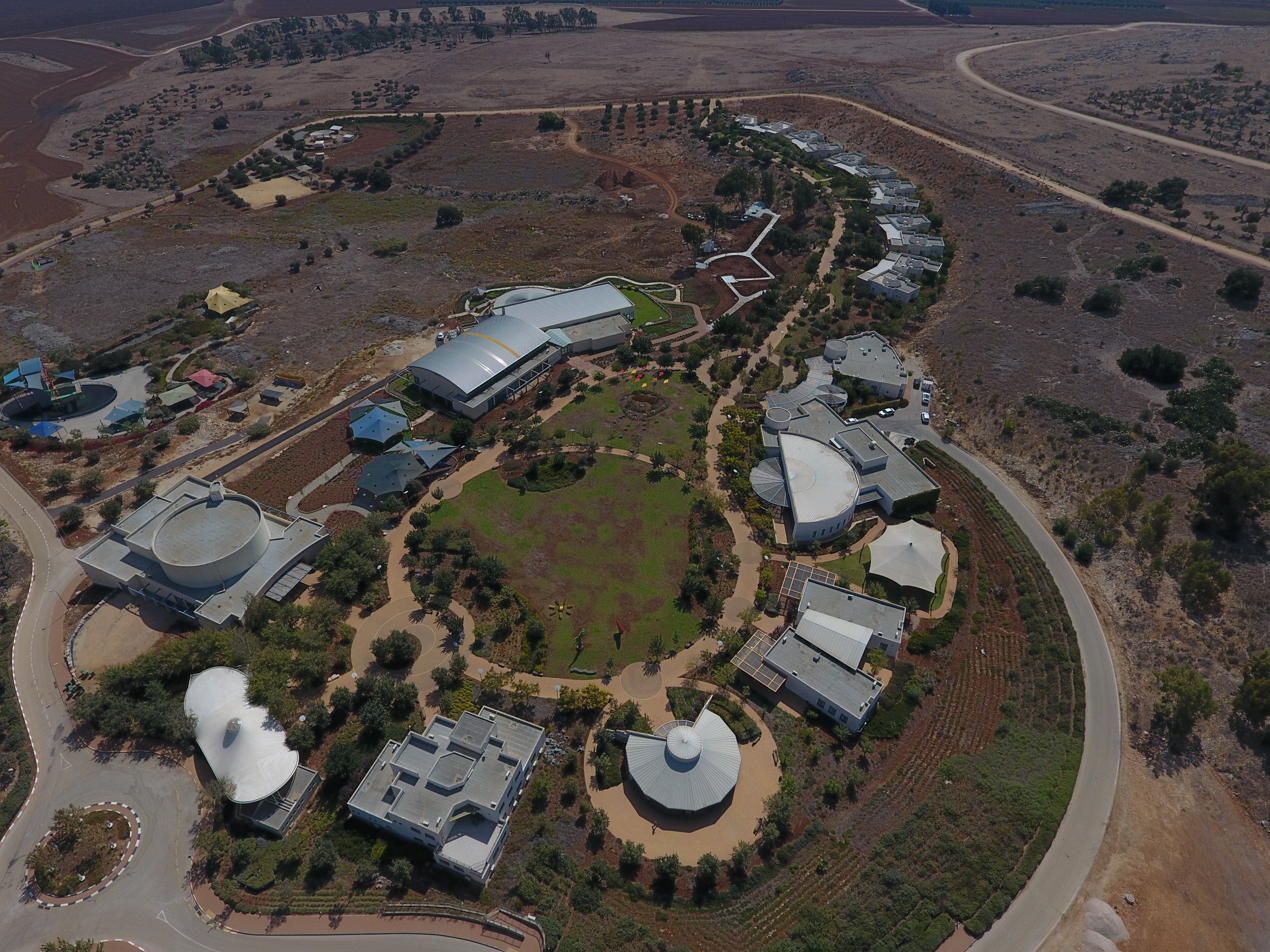
- View of the village from above
- Formation: 2011; 15 years ago
- Type: Non-profit
- Headquarters: Near Giv'at Avni, Lower Galilee, Israel
- Services: Free, fun-filled, empowering camping experiences for children with serious illnesses

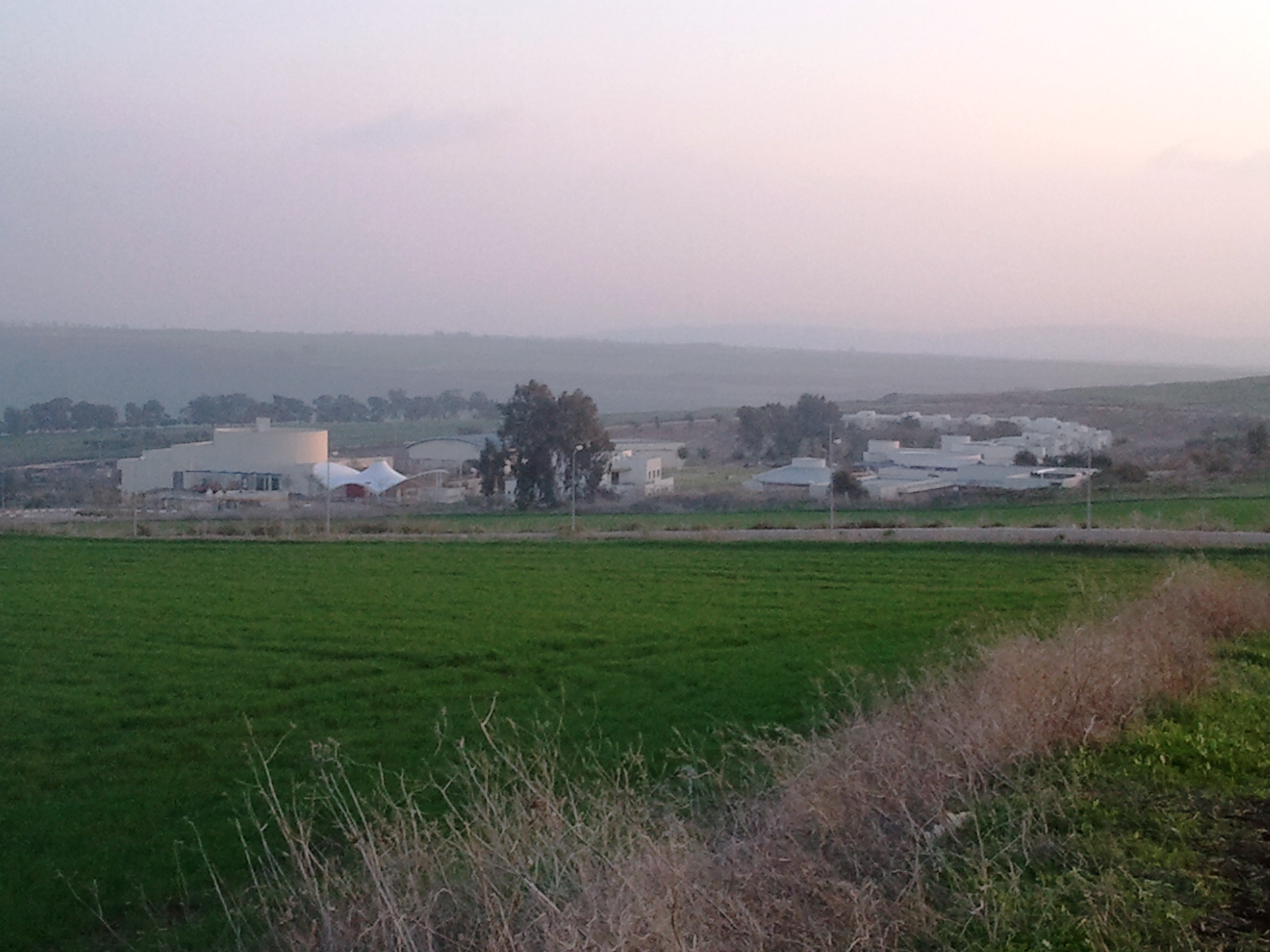
Jordan River Village

Jordan River Village is a vacation village in Israel for children with life-limiting conditions (serious illnesses, chronic illnesses, genetic diseases, special needs). The facility is located near Giv'at Avni in the Lower Galilee.

== History ==
The goal of the village is "to enrich the lives of Jewish and Arab children, in Israel and in the neighboring countries, suffering from serious illnesses and life-threatening conditions by creating free, fun-filled, memorable, empowering, medically sound and safe camping experiences". After more than 10 years of planning, raising funds, working with the Israeli government, and building relationships around the world Jordan River Village began operations in August 2011. The Village is part of Paul Newman's SeriousFun Children's Network, formerly the Association of Hole in the Wall Camps, a global community of 30 camps and programs for seriously ill children.

The Village is modeled after the Hole in the Wall Gang Camp, founded in 1988 in Connecticut by Paul Newman. Newman played Ari Ben Canaan in the 1960 film Exodus, filmed in the same region of Israel as the camp is located.

The Israeli government contributed 20% of its budget.

Israeli actor Chaim Topol served as chairman of the board. He described it as the philanthropic project to which he was most connected.

The Village covers an area of 25.4 hectares (63 acres), and includes an indoor swimming pool equipped for hydrotherapy, sports facilities, a gymnasium, a theater, an art and crafts center, a camping area, an adventure tower and a state-of-the-art medical center.

== See also ==
- Health in Israel
