= Over the Wall (charity) =

Over The Wall
- Founded: 1999
- Website: http://otw.org.uk

Over The Wall is a UK charity that provides residential summer camps for children and their families coping with serious illnesses and conditions. It is a member of the SeriousFun Children's Network, a worldwide association of camps for seriously ill children. The charity was co-founded by Joe Woods and Paul Newman in 1999 as The Over The Wall Gang Camp in the style of the American Hole in the Wall Gang Camp set up by Paul Newman.

== Camp Programme ==
The camp currently provides around 10 camps a year for children and families affected by serious illness. All of the camps are provided completely free of charge. There are currently three different types of camp offered throughout the year:

- Seriously ill children ages 8–17 years (5 nights)
- Siblings of seriously ill children aged 8–17 years (4 nights)
- Family groups, with a child with a serious illness (2 nights)

In 2013, the charity held summer camps in England and Scotland for 444 children between the ages of 8 and 17, with over 130 different medical conditions, including blood disorders, cancers and tumours, cerebral palsy, genetic disorders, epilepsy, heart conditions and many more, including extremely rare illnesses. The camps for siblings of children with serious illness are typically organised in the Easter Holidays, and shorter family camps are organised throughout the year.

Whilst at camp the children are able to try a wide variety of activities often including; wall climbing, abseiling, fishing, canoeing, horse riding, archery, swimming, arts and crafts, music, drama, sports, talent night and a disco.

Until 2024, and unlike other camps in the SeriousFun Children's Network, Over The Wall had no permanent site and held camps in multiple locations in the UK, including at Bryanston School, Tulliallan Castle, and Strathallan School. However, in April 2024 Over The Wall signed a forty year lease with the Moravian Union to take occupancy of the former Ockbrook School, located at Ockbrook, near Derby. Over The Wall will utilise the site as its new headquarters and location for residential camps, with the first camp due to take place in summer 2026.

== Aims of the Camps ==
While hospitals and healthcare staff aim to take care of the physical aspects of serious illness in a child, living with a serious illness can impact children in a number of ways. The diagnosis of a serious illness at an early age, and the subsequent lengthy process of treatment and hospital visits are likely to result in a lack of confidence and self-esteem in most children. Over The Wall aims to rebuild their confidence and esteem through a programme of Therapeutic Recreation, all whilst letting children "kick back, relax and raise a little hell".

In summer of 2012, The Child Study Center at Yale Medical School began a study to measure the impact of SeriousFun camps on children with serious illness. 254 families using 12 SeriousFun camps including Over The Wall were studied and a number of outcomes were monitored one month after attending camp and then reevaluated six months after camp. The study found significant improvements in outcomes including self-esteem, maturity, independence, quality of life measures and positive coping strategies, which were still maintained at the six month follow-up.
