= SeriousFun Children's Network =

International network for seriously ill children

- Founded: 1988
- Founder: Paul Newman
- Formerly called: The Association of Hole in the Wall Camps

SeriousFun Children's Network is a global community of 30 camps and programs for seriously ill children. All camps and programs offer free recreational experiences to children with serious illnesses and their family members. The first SeriousFun camp was launched in 1988 by founder Paul Newman.

SeriousFun camps and programs serve children living with over 50 medical conditions, including those with cancer, HIV/AIDS, sickle cell disease, endocrine disorders, orthopedic conditions and severe asthma. Since 1988, SeriousFun camps and programs have served over 1.3 million children and their family members from more than 40 countries.

== History ==
The organization was founded by Paul Newman, who wished to establish a place where children living with serious illnesses could enjoy their childhood.

- In 1988, the first SeriousFun camp, The Hole in the Wall Gang Camp, was opened. By 1994, two more camps opened, expanding the network to Europe.
- In 2007, Bátor Tábor joined the SeriousFun Children’s Network and has since become one of Hungary’s leading nonprofit organizations supporting children with serious illnesses in the Central European region.
- In 2008, SeriousFun's Global Partnership Program was begun. The program provides camp experiences to children with serious illnesses throughout Africa, Asia and the Caribbean by partnering with locally operated, internationally trusted organizations.
- In 2012, SeriousFun Children's Network unveiled its new brand name and logo (formerly known as The Association of Hole in the Wall Camps). The title "SeriousFun" was said to acknowledge Newman's playful humor and the impact that fun can have on the lives of children with serious medical conditions.

== Camps and programs ==
All SeriousFun camps and programs deliver a recreational camp experience, adapted to meet medical needs and intentionally programmed to foster psychological and social development. Programs include Residential Camp, Hospital and Community Outreach, Family Weekends, Sibling Camp, Bereavement Sessions and Winter Adaptive Camp. SeriousFun camps and programs serve children living with over 50 medical conditions. These include, but are not limited, to cancer; rheumatologic, blood, endocrine, gastrointestinal, genetic, immunologic, metabolic, neurological and vascular disorders; orthopedic, cardiology, pulmonary and skin conditions; and ventilator dependencies. The organization aims to make its services universally accessible and inclusive.

=== Asia ===
- Japan – Solaputi Kids' Camp
- Israel – Jordan River Village

=== Europe ===
- France – L'Envol
- Hungary – Bátor Tábor
- Ireland – Barretstown
- Italy – Dynamo Camp
- United Kingdom – Over the Wall

=== United States ===
- California – The Painted Turtle
- Colorado – Roundup River Ranch
- Connecticut – The Hole in The Wall Gang Camp
- Florida – Camp Boggy Creek
- Michigan – North Star Reach
- New York – Double H Ranch
- North Carolina – Victory Junction
- Ohio - Flying Horse Farms
- Washington – Camp Korey

== Global Partnership Program ==
The Global Partnership Program (GPP) offers camp experiences to children living with serious illnesses in Africa, Asia and the Caribbean. SeriousFun Children's Network collaborates with international organizations to implement locally designed, culturally relevant programming in the countries listed below. The camp employs therapeutic play and education.

=== Africa ===
- Botswana – Camp Hope
- Ethiopia – Camp Addis
- Lesotho – Camp 'Mamohato
- Malawi – Camp Hope
- South Africa – Camp Footprints
- Eswatini – Sibancobi Camp
- Eswatini – Sivivane Camp
- Tanzania – Salama Camp
- Uganda – Sanyuka Camp

=== Asia ===
- Cambodia – Camp Lotus
- India – Camp Rainbow
- Vietnam – Camp Colors of Love

=== Caribbean ===
- Haiti – Kan Etwal

== Impact ==
Since 1988, SeriousFun camps and programs have served 1.3 million children and family members, serving 127,153 children and family members in 2015 alone. The name SeriousFun is said to acknowledge Paul Newman's playful humor and the belief that it is important to take fun seriously. The positive effects of time spent at camp on the physical and psychological well-being of children with illnesses have been supported by scientific research. According to a 2014-2015 Outcomes Evaluation conducted by Yale's Child Study Center, 79% of camper parents reported an increase in their child's confidence, 74% reported an increase in their child's independence and 80% reported greater openness in their child's willingness to try new things after camp. According to the Global Partnership Program Camp Outcomes Evaluation conducted by San Diego State University in 2013, there was a 58% improvement in campers taking their ART (antiretroviral therapy) medicines in Ethiopia, India and Vietnam after having attended camp.

== Structure ==
SeriousFun Children's Network is a registered nonprofit 501(c)(3) American organization. Within its global network, 16 are Full Member camps, which are independently managed and financed nonprofit 501(c)(3) organizations. SeriousFun camps and programs are located in the United States, Europe, Africa, Asia and the Caribbean. The Support Center, based in Westport, Connecticut, provides technical expertise and professional development to support member camp sustainability. The center also facilitates the global delivery of camp programs through the Global Partnership Program and assists donors interested in providing financial support to multiple camps.

== Partnerships ==
- On February 17, 2015, the Ben & Jerry's co-founders appeared on the Tonight Show with Jimmy Fallon and unveiled a new flavor of ice cream, The Tonight Dough. All proceeds of the ice cream flavor support SeriousFun Children's Network.
- On February 9, 2016 Shire plc marked its 30th anniversary with its Future Generation program and a three-year, $3 million commitment to SeriousFun Children's Network. Shire's support was planned to enable almost 1,000 children with rare illnesses to attend SeriousFun camps.
- In April 2016, retailer Abercrombie & Fitch Co. announced a five-year, $15 million commitment to SeriousFun Children's Network. Its employees contributed more than 7,000 hours of volunteer service at Flying Horse Farms, a SeriousFun camp in Ohio, over the course of five years.
