= St Andrew's Church, Nottingham =

Church in Nottinghamshire, England

Coordinates: 52°57′55″N 01°09′10″W

St. Andrew's Church, Nottingham
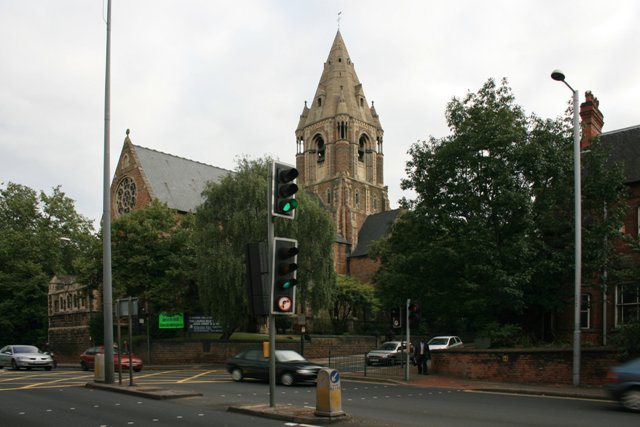
- St. Andrew's Church, Nottingham
- Denomination: Church of England
- Churchmanship: Evangelical
- Website: www.standrewsnottm.org.uk

History
- Dedication: St. Andrew

Administration
- Province: York
- Diocese: Southwell and Nottingham

Clergy
- Vicar: The Revd Jonny Hughes

St. Andrew's Church, Nottingham in Nottinghamshire, England, is a parish church in the Church of England.

== History ==
The church was built as a daughter church to St. Ann's Church, Nottingham between 1869 and 1871 by William Knight, and extended by Sidney Roberts Stevenson in 1884.

In 2023, St Andrew's Church merged into Trinity Church Nottingham, a church that had been planted on the same road in Nottingham by the HTB network in 2016. The Revd Jonny Hughes, priest-in-charge (lead pastor) of Trinity Church, Nottingham (Bishop's Mission Order), was made vicar of St Andrew's Church, Nottingham on 5 March 2023.

== Incumbents ==
- 1871 Henry Jemson Tebbutt (afterwards vicar of St George's Church, Doncaster)
- 1886 Frank Woods
- 1896 Frederick Richard Pyper
- 1911 Ernest John Bardsley (afterwards rector of St George's Church, Barton in Fabis)
- 1929 John Waring
- 1939 Robert Deaville (formerly Home Secretary of the Northern Province)
- 1967 Richard Crowson
- 1974 John Burgess
- 1980 Ronald Gordon Lacey
- 1984 Reginald Arthur Walton
- 1992 Richard Clark
- 2014 Claire Goode

== Stained glass ==
The stained glass windows are by Heaton, Butler and Bayne.

== Organ ==
The organ contains historic pipework from 1777 by John Snetzler taken from the organ formerly installed in St. Mary's Church, Nottingham. It was installed in St. Andrew's Church in 1871 by Lloyd and Dudgeon. In 1876 the organ was re-built by Bishop and Starr, and a further re-build took place in 1898 by Conacher and Co. Other work was carried out by Charles Lloyd in 1914 and 1922. In 1926, Roger Yates added a Tuba. The last re-build was in 1934 by Hill, Norman and Beard.

=== Organists ===
- Stephen Moore 1871-1874/5
- Dr. Briggs 1876
- Herbert Stephen Irons 1876-1905 (formerly organist and Rector Chori at Southwell Minster)
- Frederick Edward Hollingshead, FRCO. 1905 (formerly organist of Uttoxeter Parish Church, later organist of St. James' Church, Standard Hill)
- Dr. Samuel Corbett, FRCO 1905 - 1908 (afterwards organist at St Mary the Virgin's Church, Bottesford)
- Leonard Henniker, Mus.B. (Oxon), FRCO, ARCM., 1908 - 1950
- Robert Dickinson Sep 1950 - May 1951
- Charles Pickard May 1951 - May 1953 (previously organist of Holy Trinity Church, Lenton)
- Harry Williams May 1953 - July 1957
- Harold E.F. Bebbington July 1957 - Feb 1962 (previously organist of St Peter's Church, Nottingham and Church of St. John the Evangelist, Carrington)
- Kenneth J. Eade Feb 1962 - June 1969
- David Wilson 1969-1977
- Peter Price 1978-1990
- Leslie Roberts 1990-1992
- John Churchill 1992-2020

== See also ==
- Grade II* listed buildings in Nottinghamshire
- Listed buildings in Nottingham (Mapperley ward)
