= Church of St John the Divine, Bulwell =

Church in Nottinghamshire, England

Coordinates: 53°00′14″N 01°11′58″W

St John the Divine, Bulwell
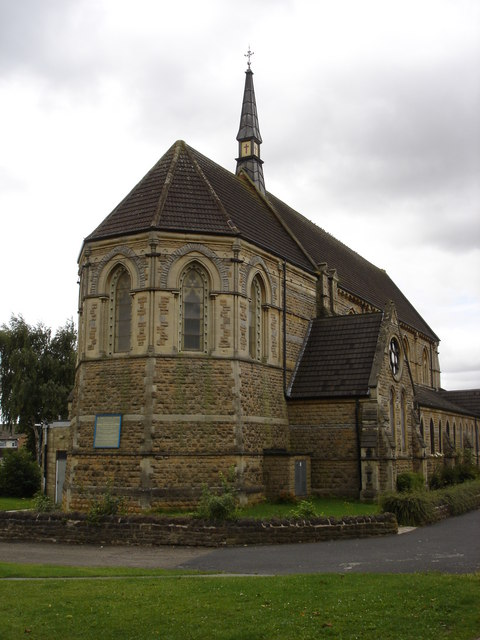
- St John the Divine, Bulwell
- Denomination: Church of England
- Churchmanship: Evangelical
- Website: www.stjohnsbullwell.org

History
- Dedication: St John the Divine

Administration
- Province: York
- Diocese: Southwell and Nottingham
- Parish: Bulwell

Clergy
- Vicar: Interregnum

The Church of St John the Divine, Bulwell is a parish church in the Church of England.

The church is Grade II listed by the Department for Digital, Culture, Media and Sport as it is a building of special architectural or historic interest.

== History ==
It was constructed between 1884 and 1885 and the architect was William Knight. It is situated on Quarry Road in Bulwell. Quarry Road no longer exists, and the Church is now situated off Keys Close.

== Stained glass ==
There is some stained glass by James Powell and Sons from 1892.

== Incumbents ==
- Revd S Bradney
- Rev Charles W Whitacre 1935
- Rev Charles W Young 1947
- Rev Michael Hall 1973
- Revd Jeffrey P Fewkes 1981
- Revd Christopher Wade 1998
- Revd David Gray 2004

== See also ==
- Listed buildings in Nottingham (Bulwell ward)

== Sources ==
- Pevsner, Nikolaus (1979). Nottinghamshire (Pevsner Architectural Guides: Buildings of England). Harmondsworth, Middx. Penguin. ISBN 978-0300096361.
