= PacifiCare Health Systems =

Former American health insurance provider

PacifiCare Health Systems, Inc.
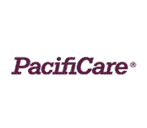
- Industry: Health insurance
- Founded: 1983; 43 years ago
- Founder: Samuel J. Tibbitts
- Defunct: December 21, 2005; 20 years ago
- Fate: Acquired by UnitedHealth Group
- Headquarters: Cypress, California
- Number of employees: 7,500

PacifiCare Health Systems, Inc. was a provider of health insurance based in Cypress, California. It was acquired by UnitedHealth Group in 2005.

== History ==
The predecessor of the company was founded in 1978 by Samuel J. Tibbitts as a subsidiary of the Lutheran Hospital Society of Southern California. PacifiCare was incorporated in 1983.

In 1985, PacifiCare of Oregon was created. In 1993, Alan Hoops replaced Terry Hartshorn as president and CEO. The company also acquired Freedom Plan, California Dental Health Plan, and Advantage Health Plans. In 1996, it acquired FHP.

In December 2005, the company was acquired by UnitedHealth Group. At that time, the company had 705,000 Medicare enrollees.

The company continued to market health plans under the PacifiCare and SecureHorizons names until 2011, when it changed to the UnitedHealthcare name.

== Sponsorship and philanthropy ==
The company sponsored Newman/Haas Racing for the 2003 CART season, the 2004 Champ Car season, and the 2005 Champ Car season and donated to support The Painted Turtle. It was replaced as a sponsor in 2006.
