= The Painted Turtle =

Summer camp in Lake Hughes, California

Coordinates: 34.670201°N 118.431281°W

- Founded: 1999; 27 years ago
- Founder: Paul Newman, Page & Lou Adler
- Location: Lake Hughes, California, United States
- Website: www.thepaintedturtle.org

The Painted Turtle is a Summer camp located near Lake Elizabeth in Lake Hughes, California. The camp is for children who are faced with life-threatening and chronic illnesses. Many of these children would not have the opportunity to have a camping experience due to their illness. The year-round programming for campers and their families is provided free of charge.

== History ==
The Painted Turtle was founded in 1999 by Paul Newman and Page and Lou Adler. The camp was conceptualized by Adler and soon was able to get Newman to sponsor it as a part of his Hole in the Wall Gang Camps. The camp got its name from the painted turtle, a widespread species found in most of the United States (but not native to California). Adler says, "It's an animal that has a tough exterior and a soft interior, very much like these kids that we're serving." The camp opened its doors in the Fall of 2003.

The camp suffered damage during the Power House Fire in 2013. Several outbuildings and facilities were destroyed in the fire which caused the organization to cancel all summer sessions that had been planned for the year. Beside the direct damage from the fire itself, the air conditioning systems located in cabins and buildings throughout the camp had been compromised by smoke and ash and had to be cleaned.

The camp resumed its summer camp program in June 2022 following a two year shutdown due to the global COVID-19 pandemic. During the shutdown, several concrete paths were added in order to improve access to various activity areas for people with limited mobility.

== Camp experiences ==
Activities include horseback riding, ropes course, arts and crafts, woodshop, archery, team building experiences, fishing, boating, singing and dancing. Campers stay in small dormitory type housing units called bales.

Many different groups come through the camp every year and stay for about a week. These groups include:

1. Crohn's disease and ulcerative colitis (inflammatory bowel disease)
2. Skeletal dysplasia (dwarfism)
3. Asthma
4. Kidney transplant
5. Diabetes
6. Arthritis
7. Liver transplant
8. Spina bifida
9. Hemophilia
10. Muscular dystrophy
11. Primary immunodeficiency disease

Several family weekends are also held in the spring and fall where families of children can get a taste of the camp experience. The facility also offers a program that takes the camp experience to children who are hospitalized and too ill to attend the camp.

== Corporate contributions ==
Several companies have made substantial contributions in order to help the foundation build the facilities at the camp. PacifiCare Health Systems (now part of UnitedHealth Group) provided funds to build the camps "Well Shell" building. This building is staffed by a team of medical professionals during camp sessions treating campers requiring routine treatment for their illnesses like infusions and Dialysis along with the normal scrapes, cuts and bruises suffered during their time at the camp. Rooms throughout the facility are decorated to resemble a tiki hut and other scenery.

The Los Angeles Lakers provided the floor for the camp's gymnasium and Sea World provided funding for the camp's swimming pool which is shaped like a killer whale.

== Volunteers ==
The Painted Turtle is run with the help of volunteers. In 1995, the then Hole in the Wall Camps became The Phi Kappa Tau fraternity's national philanthropy program. Now known as SeriousFun Children's Network, the Fraternity recognises this camp and the entire network as their national philanthropy program. In June 2006 a national collegiate sorority, Delta Zeta, partnered with The Painted Turtle. Given this partnership the camp became a part of the sorority's national philanthropy program.

== See also ==
- Hole in the Wall Camps
