= Ockbrook School =

Location
- The Settlement; Derby, Derbyshire, DE72 3RJ; England
- Coordinates: 52.921°N 1.3761°W

Information
- Type: Private day and boarding
- Motto: Vicit Agnus Noster Eum Sequamur ("Our Lamb has conquered, let us follow Him") (church motto) In Christo omnia possum ("I can do all things through Christ", from Phil 4:13)(school motto)
- Religious affiliation: Moravian Church
- Established: 1799; 227 years ago
- Closed: July 2021
- Local authority: Derbyshire
- Department for Education URN: 113007 Tables
- Headmaster: J M Shipway
- Gender: Boys and Girls
- Age: 3 to 18
- Enrolment: 300~
- Houses: Cennick, Budowa and Comenius
- Colour: Scarlet
- Website: http://www.ockbrooksch.co.uk/

Ockbrook School was an independent coeducational day and boarding school for children aged 3–18 years situated in rural Derbyshire between the cities of Nottingham and Derby. Boarding was for boys and girls from age 11–18 years. On Monday 7 June 2021 the school announced it was closing at the end of the summer term.

Ockbrook was founded by the Moravian Church and its Christian heritage is evidenced by its school emblem, which features the Agnus Dei, and the school motto, which is also the motto of the Church.

== History ==
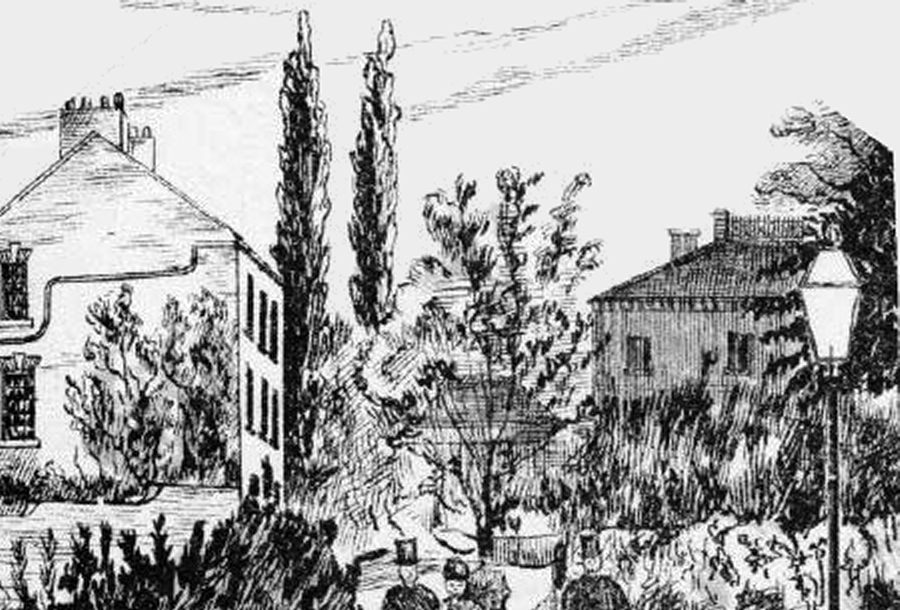
An extension to the Ladies school in the 1880s.

Ockbrook was founded in 1799 by the Moravian Church and continued to maintain a Christian ethos. The school was originally a ladies' school and the boys' school did not open until 1813. It became a girls-only school in 1915. The primary section later became coeducational, although this was later extended throughout the school.

The Church continued to be responsible for the school but in the later years responsibility was exercised largely through the school's local board of governors.

A history of the school was published in 2000 as part of the bicentenary celebrations (1799–1999).

In March 2012 the board of governors announced the decision to extend the 11+ intake to boys beginning in September 2013 as a step towards coeducation. The school was fully coeducational from September 2016.

== Buildings ==
The main building in the school, referred to as "main school" was used for most lessons and housed the English, Maths, Humanities and Languages departments, along with other smaller classrooms for 6th form use. The main school also provided form rooms for years 7–13.

The Grange was a primary building located near to the main school, next to the Birtill Hall (named after a previous Head Teacher.) The Mount was a further primary building, housing nursery and years 1, and 2. Pupils moved over to The Grange for years 3, 4, 5 and 6.

The school also had a Sports Complex, Arts and Technology complex (named Mallalieu Centre), Music block, Lecture Theatre and Science complex (opened in 2003).

The school also operated 3 boarding houses: Mews, Liley House and Broadstairs located on the campus.

== Closure ==
On 7 June 2021, the school announced to staff, students and parents that the school would close at the end of the summer term. On 8 June the school announced that it remained "significantly loss-making", a situation made worse by the COVID-19 pandemic

As of 31 March 2024, the school's former grounds are set to be converted to encampments for the Over The Wall charity starting in 2026.

== Notable alumni ==
Valerie Domleo – physicist, rally co-driver and farmer

Alex Hamilton – BBC Presenter and weather presenter

Kate Oates – British television producer, known for her work on the soap operas The Archers, Emmerdale, and Coronation Street.

Squash Falconer – adventurer, mountaineer, motivational speaker and presenter

Sidney Roberts Stevenson – architect

Former pupils are entitled membership of the Ockbrook School Leavers' Association (OSLA).
