= Mapperley Hospital =

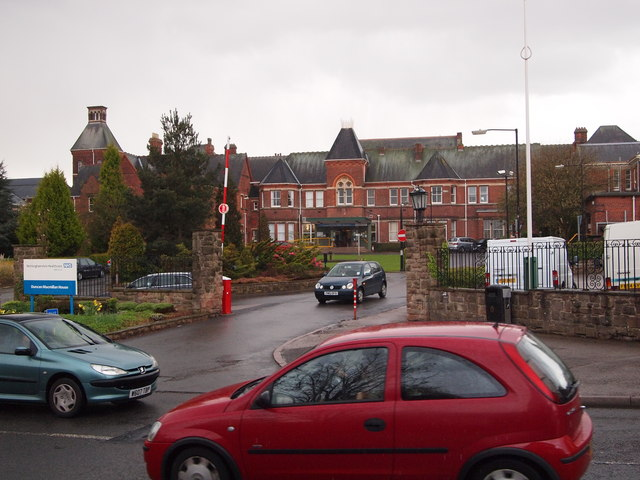
- Mapperley Hospital

- Shown in Nottinghamshire

Geography
- Location: Mapperley, Nottinghamshire, England
- Coordinates: 52.9799°N 1.1276°W

Organisation
- Care system: NHS
- Type: Specialist

Services
- Emergency department: N/A
- Speciality: Psychiatric Hospital

History
- Founded: 1880
- Closed: 1994

Links
- Lists: Hospitals in England

Mapperley Hospital was a mental health facility on Porchester Road in Nottingham, England.

== History ==
The hospital, which was designed by George Thomas Hine using a linear corridor layout, opened as the Nottingham Borough Lunatic Asylum in August 1880. It was extended in 1889 and joined the National Health Service as Mapperley Hospital in 1948.

After the introduction of Care in the Community in the early 1980s, the hospital went into a period of decline and closed in December 1994.

Today, most of the original buildings still remain, but have been repurposed. The north end of the campus has been renamed "Duncan Macmillan House" and is now used as the headquarters of the Nottinghamshire Healthcare NHS Foundation Trust while the south end of the campus has been renamed "Nightingale House" and has been converted into privately owned apartments. Meanwhile, a modern mental health facility, known as the Wells Road Centre, has been established to the west of the site and provides low secure in-patient services.

== See also ==
- Listed buildings in Nottingham (Mapperley ward)
