= Sidney Roberts Stevenson =

English architect

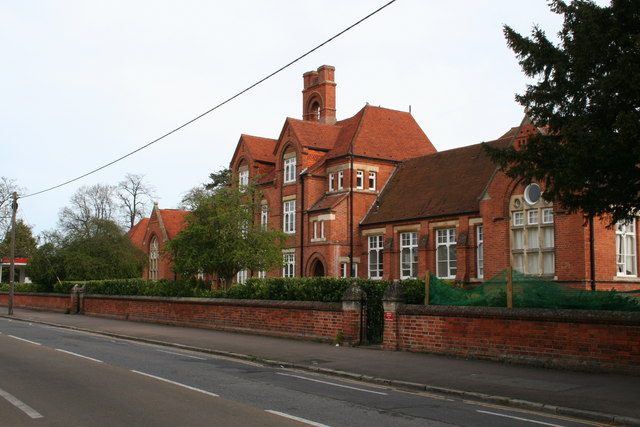
Wallingford Grammar School, 1875-77

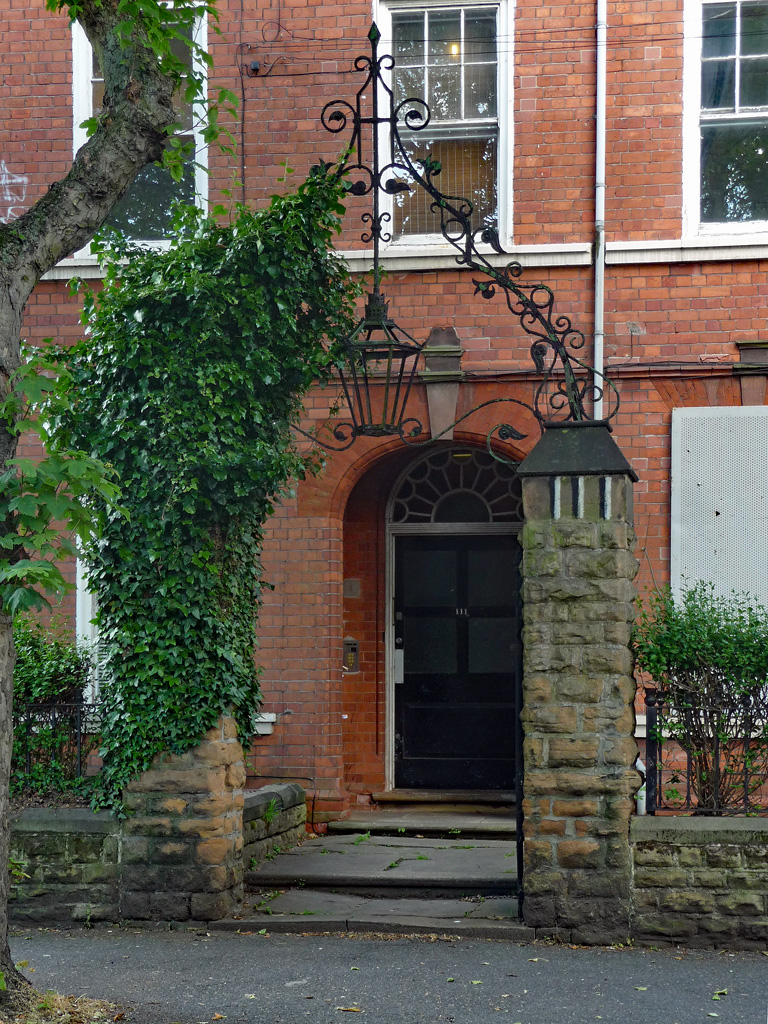
Detail of 111 Forest Road West, Nottingham 1884

Sidney Roberts Stevenson FRIBA (1850 - 21 January 1928) was an English architect based in Nottingham.

== Career ==
He was born in 1850 in Nottingham and educated at Ockbrook School and later in Leamington. He studied at Nottingham School of Art at which he won a 12 month Free Art Studentship and was articled to Richard Charles Sutton. He began independent practice as an architect in Nottingham in 1871 and was initially based in offices in Victoria Street, but later moved to Queen’s Chambers, King Street in Nottingham.

In 1873 he submitted plans into a competition for St Paul’s Church, Chester. Sir Gilbert Scott acted as the judge and awarded the prize to Sidney Stevenson.

In 1908 he moved from his office in Burns Street and started to work in collaboration with John Rigby Poyser.

He was appointed a Fellow of the Royal Institute of British Architects in 1925.

He married Cecilia Farmer, fourth daughter of John Farmer of Colville Street, Nottingham, at St. John the Baptist's Church, Leenside, Nottingham on 31 July 1873 and they had the following children:

- Gertrude M Stevenson (b. 1875)
- Mary C. Stevenson (b. 1877)
- Norah Roberts Stevenson (b. 1881)
- Amy Dorothy Stevenson (b. 1882)

He died on 21 January 1928 in London and left an estate valued at £2,412 16d 7d (equivalent to £183,600 in 2023).

== Notable works ==
- New Factory (possibly Victoria Works) for H. & F. Simpson, High Church Street, New Basford, Nottingham 1872-73
- Sixteen cottages, (29-59?) Gawthorne Street, New Basford, Nottingham 1873
- New Factory for Hardy, Turney and Co, Thoroton Street, Alfreton Road, Nottingham 1873-74
- Nottingham Town Club House, 10 Wheeler Gate, Nottingham 1874 (demolished 1950s)
- McIvor House, 93 Forest Road West, Nottingham 1874 (now demolished)
- Wallingford Grammar School, Berkshire 1875-77
- School on Melton Road, between Nether Broughton and Upper Broughton 1876 (demolished ca. 2018)
- Villa residence for Thomas Appleby Stephenson M.D., 33 Burns Street/2 Gedling Grove, Nottingham 1877
- Girls’ Upper School, Burton Street, Loughborough 1878-79
- 5 Broadway, Nottingham 1882 (additions)
- House for Dr. Rupert Cecil Chicken (surgeon), 111 Forest Road West, Nottingham 1884
- St Andrew's Church, Nottingham 1883 West extension and new porch
- St Andrew's Church, Nottingham 1884 addition of baptistry
- St James’ Church, Brightwell-cum-Sotwell, Oxfordshire 1884
- Shop, 49 Bridlesmith Gate, Nottingham 1897-98
- Dwelling house and solicitor’s office for Mr. Parker Woodward, Station Street, Nottingham 1899 New chancel and organ chamber
- St Peter's Church, Wallingford 1904-05 New chancel and organ chamber
