= Over the Garden Wall (disambiguation) =

Over the Garden Wall is an American television series created by Patrick McHale for Cartoon Network.

Over the Garden Wall may also refer to:

- Over the Garden Wall (1919 film), a lost 1919 American film directed by David Smith
- Over the Garden Wall (1934 film), a British comedy film
- Over the Garden Wall, a 1948-1950 British radio comedy show starring Norman Evans
- Over the Garden Wall (1950 film), a comedy sketch and feature film based on the radio show
