= William Knight (architect) =

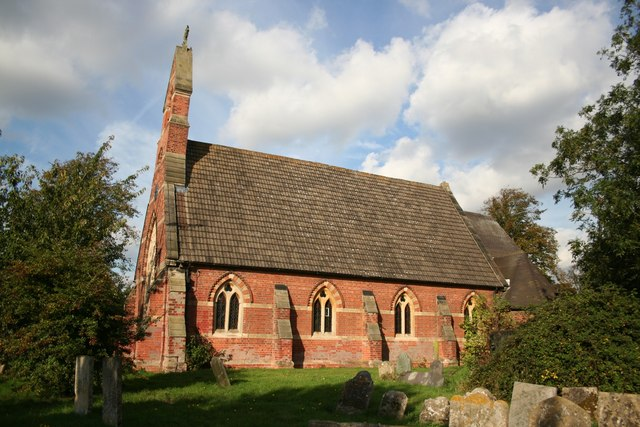
St Michael's Church, Hoveringham 1865

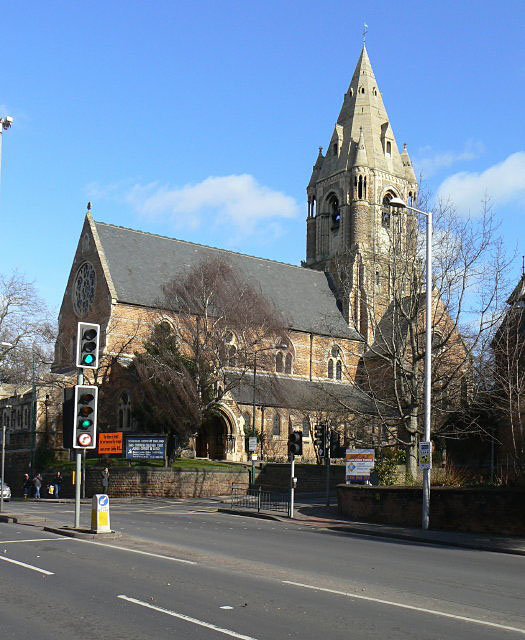
St Andrew's Church, Nottingham 1870-71

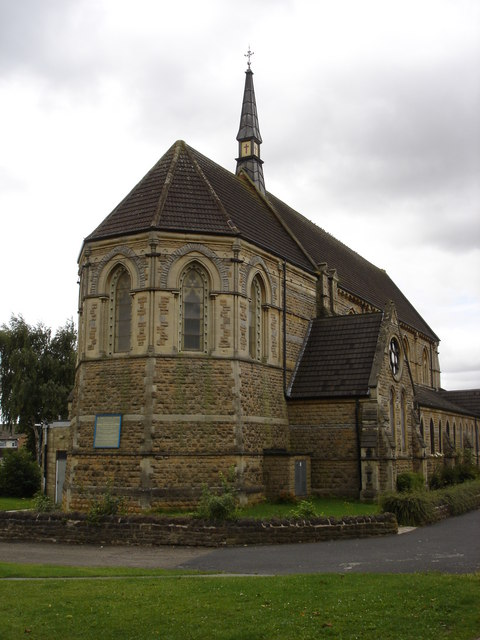
Church of St John the Divine, Bulwell 1884-85

William Knight (1840 - 21 November 1923) was an English architect based in Nottingham.

== Career ==
He was born in Sneinton, Nottingham, the son of William Knight (1808-1897), timber merchant, and Mary Ann (b. 1817).

He had offices at 28 Derby Road, and in 1882 moved to East Circus Street, Nottingham.

He married Elizabeth Lindsay Symington (1842-1894), 3rd daughter of James Symington, on 3 April 1872 in St Helen's Church, Oxendon, Leicestershire and they had the following children:

- William P. Knight (b. 1873)
- Harold Knight (1874-1961)
- Ethel Lindsay Knight (1875-1941)
- Agnes Mary Knight (1877-1950)
- Edgar Knight (b. 1881)

He retired to Great Bowden, Leicestershire, where he died on 21 November 1923.

== Notable works ==
- St Michael's Church, Hoveringham 1865 (rebuilding)
- St Andrew's Church, Nottingham 1870-71
- Vicarage to St Andrew’s Church, Chestnut Grove, Nottingham 1871
- National Schools, Carlton Road, Nottingham 1872
- Christ Church, Bexley Heath 1872-77
- No. 3, Plumptre Place, Lace Market, Nottingham 1879
- Nether Broughton Church, 1882 (restoration of the tower)
- Church of St John the Divine, Bulwell 1884-85
- Fairlawn, Leicester Road, Market Harborough (for Captain Robert Symington) ca. 1880s.
