= The Hole in the Wall Gang Camp =

American nonprofit summer camp

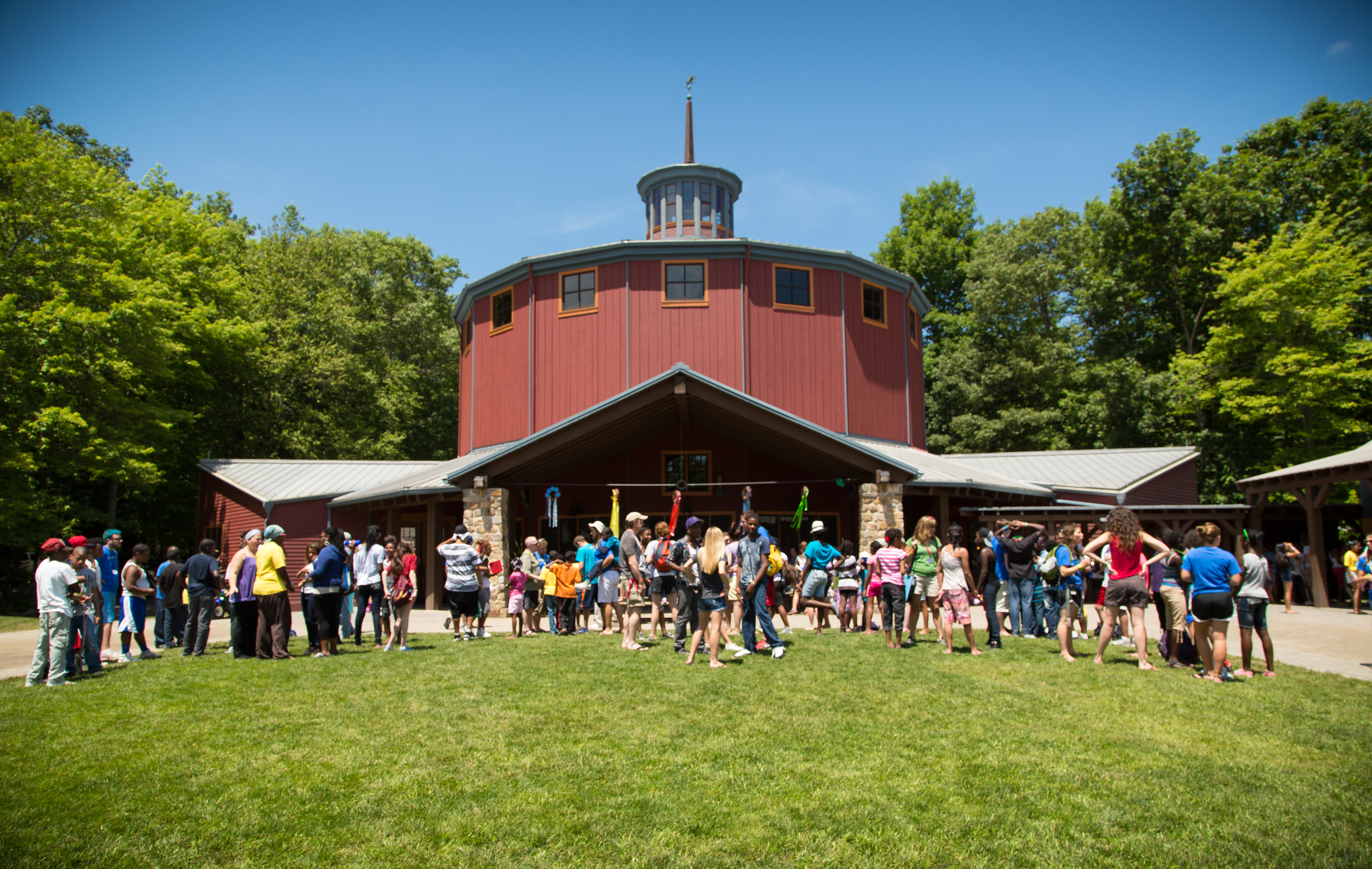
- The Dining Hall at the Ashford location
- Abbreviation: THITWGC
- Founded: 1988
- Founder: Paul Newman
- Tax ID no.: 06-1157655, 31-1794455
- Location: 565 Ashford Center Road Ashford, Connecticut 06278
- Coordinates: 41°53′06″N 72°07′03″W
- CEO: Hilary Axtmayer
- CFO: James Takami
- Camp Director: Jimmy Guity
- Board of directors: List of Board Members: Jeffrey H. Horstman (Chair); Khaled F. Alhegelan; Gregory Brousseau; Steven Choi, M.D.; Bradley Cooper; Terry Coughlin; Andy Crowley; Bonnie Ferro; Ursula L. Gwynne; Christina Horner; Adam C. Jed; Paula A. Johnson, M.D.; Daniel R. Kail; Richard D. Kayne, M.D.; Sandy Koufax; Gary Kupfer, M.D.; Raymond Lamontagne; Jay Levine; Stefani LiDestri; Bridget Moynahan; James Naughton; Melissa Newman; Allison E. Picott, J.D.; Kingdar Prussien; Erin Rodliff; Peter B. Schottland; Matt Sheeleigh; Ana Villafañe; Luke Wilson; Dan Zabrowksi
- Affiliations: SeriousFun Children's Network American Camp Association
- Revenue: $24,758,765 (2025)
- Expenses: $22,435,106 (2025)
- Endowment: $177,597,435 (2025)
- Website: www.holeinthewallgang.org

The Hole in the Wall Gang Camp, based in Ashford, Connecticut, is a nonprofit 501(c)(3) organization, residential summer camp, and year-round center serving children and their families coping with chronic illnesses such as cancer, sickle cell disease and many others.

== History ==
The Hole in the Wall Gang Camp was founded by actor Paul Newman in 1988. The camp is named after the gang in Newman's film Butch Cassidy and the Sundance Kid. The camp is a 300-acre (1.2 km^{2}) parcel of land including a 44-acre (180,000 m^{2}) lake.

== Services ==
The camp's programs include year-round outreach to hospitals and clinics, and ongoing services for children, families and caregivers. These programs serve 20,000 children and family members annually. All of the services are provided free of charge.

=== Summer Camp ===
Each summer, the camp offers seven one-week sessions for children aged seven to fifteen diagnosed with cancer, sickle cell anemia, hemophilia, metabolic and mitochondrial disorders, and other serious illnesses and conditions and one session for their healthy siblings. Weekend programs that run in the fall and spring provide a camp experience for the family unit. Activities at the camp include horseback riding, boating, swimming, fishing, crafts, archery, sports and recreation.

The organization also offers regional family outreach programming across the Northeast for the families it serves.

=== Hospital Outreach Program (HOP) ===
The hospital outreach program serves children in hospitals across the Northeastern United States. The camp's staff members make regular visits to these children, introducing services that are consistent with the spirit and programs offered in the camp's Ashford facility.

As of June 2024, HOP serves 33 medical centers in New England, New York City, and Philadelphia.

=== Team Hole in the Wall ===
Team Hole in the Wall is an athletic fundraising initiative managed by the Hole in the Wall Gang Camp. Amateur athletes join up to raise a specified amount of funds and receive entrance to a marathon, bike ride or other athletic event in support of seriously ill children served by The Hole in the Wall Gang Camp or one of its associated camps around the world. Established in 2005, Team Hole in the Wall offers entrance into more than two dozen marathons and cycling events, including the New York City Marathon, Boston Marathon and AngelRide cycling event in Connecticut. New Canaan resident and Newman's Own Vice President of Marketing Michael "Mike" Havard ran in the ING New York City Marathon prior to 2004, but in that year he decided to use his participation to raise funds for The Hole in the Wall Gang Camp, raising nearly $40,000. The next year, he served as captain of the first Team Hole in the Wall team of 40 runners, raising $150,000. The number of Team Hole in the Wall members and events has risen each year since. In 2010, more than 1,800 Team Hole in the Wall members are expected to participate in 20 athletic events.

== Funding ==
The camp relies upon contributions from individuals, corporations, foundations, and organizations, receiving support from more than 25,000 annual donors and many organizations, including Newman's Own, AngelRide Charitable Trust, Travelers Championship, the International Longshoreman's Association Children's Fund, and Newman's college fraternity, Phi Kappa Tau.

The camp also provides advice and financial support to other camps with similar missions, as part of the SeriousFun Children's Network, a worldwide association of camps for seriously ill children.

== See also ==
- The Painted Turtle
- Double H Ranch
- Barretstown
- Therapeutic recreation
- Childhood cancer
