= Black Boy (disambiguation) =

Black Boy is a memoir by American author Richard Wright published in 1945.

Black Boy, black boy, or blackboy may also refer to:

- "Black Boy" (song), a 1984 song by Aboriginal Australian band Coloured Stone
- Black Boy Hotel, a former hotel in Nottingham, England
- Black Boy Inn, a hotel and pub in Caernarfon, Wales
- Black Boy Island, an island in the Thames River near Windsor, England
- Blackboy (plant), an obsolete name for species in the plant genus Xanthorrhoea

== See also ==
- Black Boys Bridge, a road bridge in Newbury, Berkshire, England
- Blackboy Hill, Bristol, the upper part of Whiteladies Road in Bristol, England
- Blackboy Hill, Western Australia
- Black Boy Shine (c. 1908–1952), stage name of Harold Holiday, an American blues pianist and singer-songwriter
- Blackboys, a village near Framfield in East Sussex, England
