= Watson Fothergill =

British architect

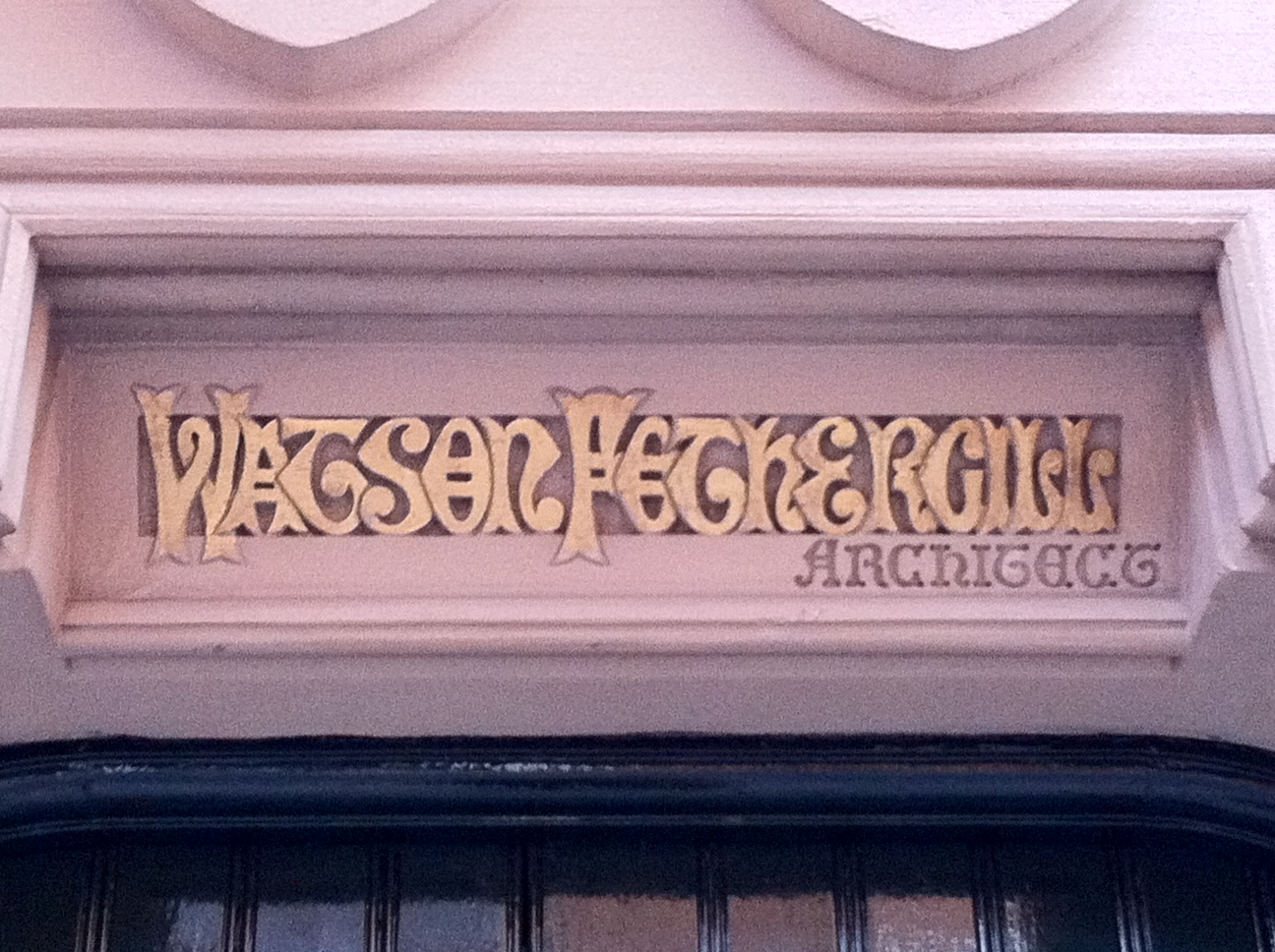
- Title above the door of the Watson Fothergill offices at 15 George Street, Nottingham
- Born: 12 July 1841; Linden, Chesterfield Road, Mansfield
- Died: 6 March 1928 (aged 86); 7 Mapperley Road, Nottingham
- Other name: Fothergill Watson
- Occupation: Architect
- Spouse: Ann Hage
- Practice: Associated architectural firm[s]
- Buildings: Nottingham and Nottinghamshire Bank, Thurland Street, Nottingham

Watson Fothergill (12 July 1841 – 6 March 1928) was a British architect who designed over 100 unique buildings in Nottingham in the East Midlands of England. His influences were mainly from the Gothic Revival and Old English vernacular architecture styles.

His work dates from 1864 (when he set himself up in practice) to around 1912. His earliest surviving known building dates from 1866.

== Early life ==
Born Fothergill Watson in Mansfield, Nottinghamshire in 1841, he was the son of wealthy Nottingham Lace merchant Robert Watson and Mary Ann Fothergill. He changed his name to Watson Fothergill in 1892 to continue his maternal family name.

== Family ==
He married Anne Hage in 1867 at St. John's Church, Mansfield. They had the following children:

- Marian Watson (1868–1955)
- Annie Forbes Watson (1869–1930)
- Edith Mary Watson (1871–1936)
- Eleanor Fothergill Watson (1872–1946)
- Samuel Fothergill Watson (1875–1915)
- Harold H Watson (1877-1905)
- Clarice Watson (1877–1955)

His father-in-law was Samuel Hage, one of the founding partners of Mansfield Brewery.

His half-brother was Robert Mackie Watson, chairman of the Mansfield Improvement Commission and the Brunts' Charity.

== Career ==
In 1856, he entered the St Peter's Gate office of Frederick Jackson, an architect and surveyor in Nottingham. In mid-1860 he moved as assistant to Isaac Charles Gilbert who was based in Clinton Street, Nottingham. After spending around 18 months with Gilbert, he moved in early 1862 to join the office of Arthur William Blomfield in London. In 1864 he was working with John Middleton in Cheltenham, but in the same year, left to set up his own office at 6 Clinton Street, Nottingham. He remained at Clinton Street until it was demolished by the works in connection with the arrival of the Great Central Railway in 1894. He moved to a new temporary office at 18 George Street and arranged to rebuild 15 George Street opposite which he completed the next year and moved in on 12 December 1895.

He is credited as having had a great impact on the architecture of the major British industrial city of Nottingham, and designed over a hundred buildings in the city, from offices, banks and warehouses, to churches and private dwelling houses. His easily recognisable style includes the use of contrasting horizontal bands of red and blue brick, dark timber eaves and balconies, and elaborate turrets and stone carvings.

On his death in 1928, he left an estate valued at £73,908 5s 11d (equivalent to £4,010,000 in 2025).

List of major works

All Nottinghamshire unless otherwise stated.

1860s

- Cemetery Chapels, High Street, Ongar (joint architect with Isaac Charles Gilbert) – 1866

1870s

- Dwelling House, Mapperley Road, Nottingham (Fothergill's own house) – 1870
- Two Villas, 5 & 7 Lenton Road, The Park, Nottingham – 1873
- Temperance Hall (later Albert Hall), North Circus Street, Nottingham – 1873–1876
- Nottingham and Nottinghamshire Bank, Church Street, Mansfield – 1874–1875
- Nottingham Daily Express Offices, Printing Works and Shops, Parliament Street, Nottingham – 1875
- King's Arms, Ratcliffe Gate and Newgate Lane, Mansfield – 1875–1877
- Cattle Market, Nottingham Road, Mansfield – 1876–1878
- Congregational Church (later United Reformed), Westgate, Mansfield – 1876–1878
- Nottingham and Nottinghamshire Bank and Residence, Thurland Street, Nottingham – 1877–1882

1880s

- Villa, Crow Hill Drive, Mansfield – 1880
- Six Dwelling Houses, Shops and Carriage House, Castle Road and Houndsgate, Nottingham – 1882–1883
- Five Houses and Shops, Derby Road, Nottingham – 1884
- Institute and Coffee Tavern, High Street, Hucknall – 1884
- Nottingham and Nottinghamshire Bank, Cattle Market, Loughborough, Leicestershire – 1885
- Villa, Loscoe Hill (Clawson Lodge), 405 Mansfield Road, Nottingham – 1885
- Institute and Coffee Tavern (Budworth Hall), High Street, Ongar, Epping Forest, Essex – 1885–1887
- Villa (Walton House), 39 Newcastle Drive, The Park, Nottingham – 1886
- St. Nicholas' Church Rectory, Castle Gate, Nottingham – 1886–1887
- Pair of Villas, Loscoe Hill, 409 and 411 Mansfield Road, Nottingham – 1886–1887
- Nottingham and Nottinghamshire Bank, Kirk Gate, Newark on Trent 1885–1887
- Rebuilding Black Boy Hotel (first major rebuild / extension), Long Row, Nottingham – 1886–1888
- Pair of Villas, 62 and 64 Castle Boulevard, Nottingham – C1888
- Pair of Villas, 3 and 4 Huntingdon Drive, Nottingham – C1888
- Samuel Smith & Co's Bank, 24 Market Place, Long Eaton, Derbyshire – 1889
- Warehouse (Milbie House), 33 Pilcher Gate, Nottingham – 1889

1890s

- Villa, (Elberton House), Cavendish Hill, 9 Hardwick Road, Nottingham – 1890
- Eight Ladies' Homes – Norris Almhouses, Berridge Road, Nottingham – 1892–1893
- Emmanuel Church, Woodborough Road (1883–1893) – demolished 1972
- Woodborough Road Baptist Church, Woodborough Road and Alfred Street North, Nottingham – 1893–1895
- Simons and Pickard Paper Warehouse, Lenton (Castle) Boulevard, Nottingham – 1893–1894
- House, Kingswood, Bulcote – 1893
- Two Semi-Detached Villas (Cleave House), 1 and 3 Sherwood Rise, Nottingham – 1894–1895
- Rebuilding of Nos 15 & 17 George Street, Nottingham (Watson Fothergill's offices) – 1894–1895
- Jessops' Shop and Workrooms, 14–30 King Street, Nottingham – 1894–1897
- Four Shops and Offices (Queen's Chambers), Long Row and King Street, Nottingham – 1896–1899
- Shop and Office (Furley and Co) (now Lloyds Bank), Parliament Street and Clinton Street, Nottingham – 1896–1897
- Ellenborough House, 3 South Road, The Park, Nottingham – extended 1896–1897
- Cuckson, Hazeldine and Manderfield Warehouses, Stoney Street and Barker Gate, Nottingham – 1897–1898
- Black Boy Hotel Additions and Two Shops (second major rebuild/extension), Long Row, Nottingham – 1897–1900
- Rebuilding of the Rose of England Inn, Mansfield Road, Nottingham – 1898–1900
- Brewery, Mar Hill, Carlton – 1899
- Nottingham and Nottinghamshire Bank and House, 111 Carrington Street, Nottingham – 1899

1900s

- Nottingham and Nottinghamshire Branch Bank, St Ann's Well Road, Nottingham – 1900–1901
- Sixteen Houses, Foxhall Road, Nottingham – 1901–1902
- Union of London and Smith's Bank, Market Place, Bulwell – 1904
- Villa, Mapperley Road, Nottingham (Joint Architect with Lawrence George Summers) – 1905
- Four Houses, Mansfield Road and Bingham Road, Nottingham – 1906–1907

== Gallery ==
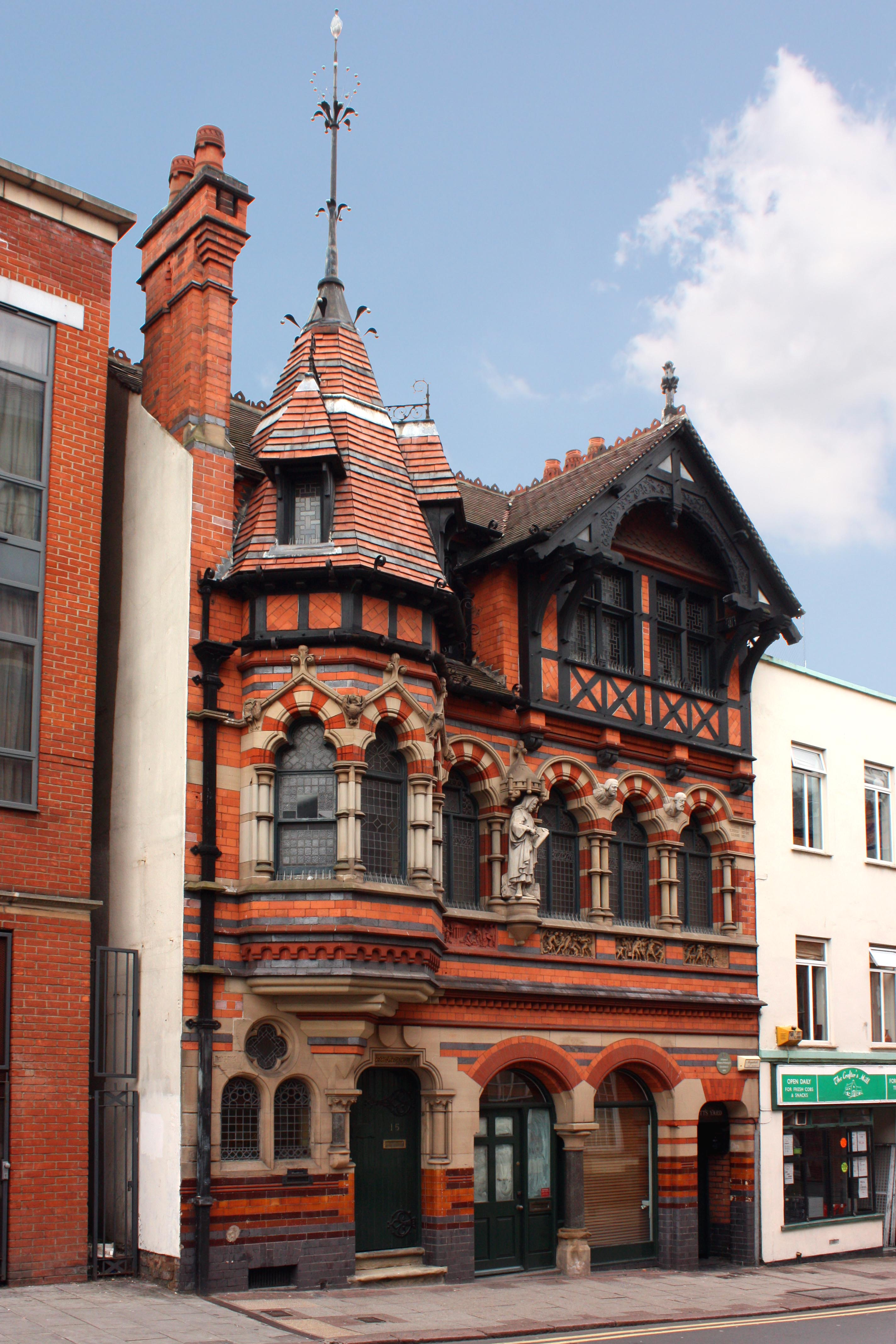
Watson Fothergill's office at 15–17 George Street, Nottingham

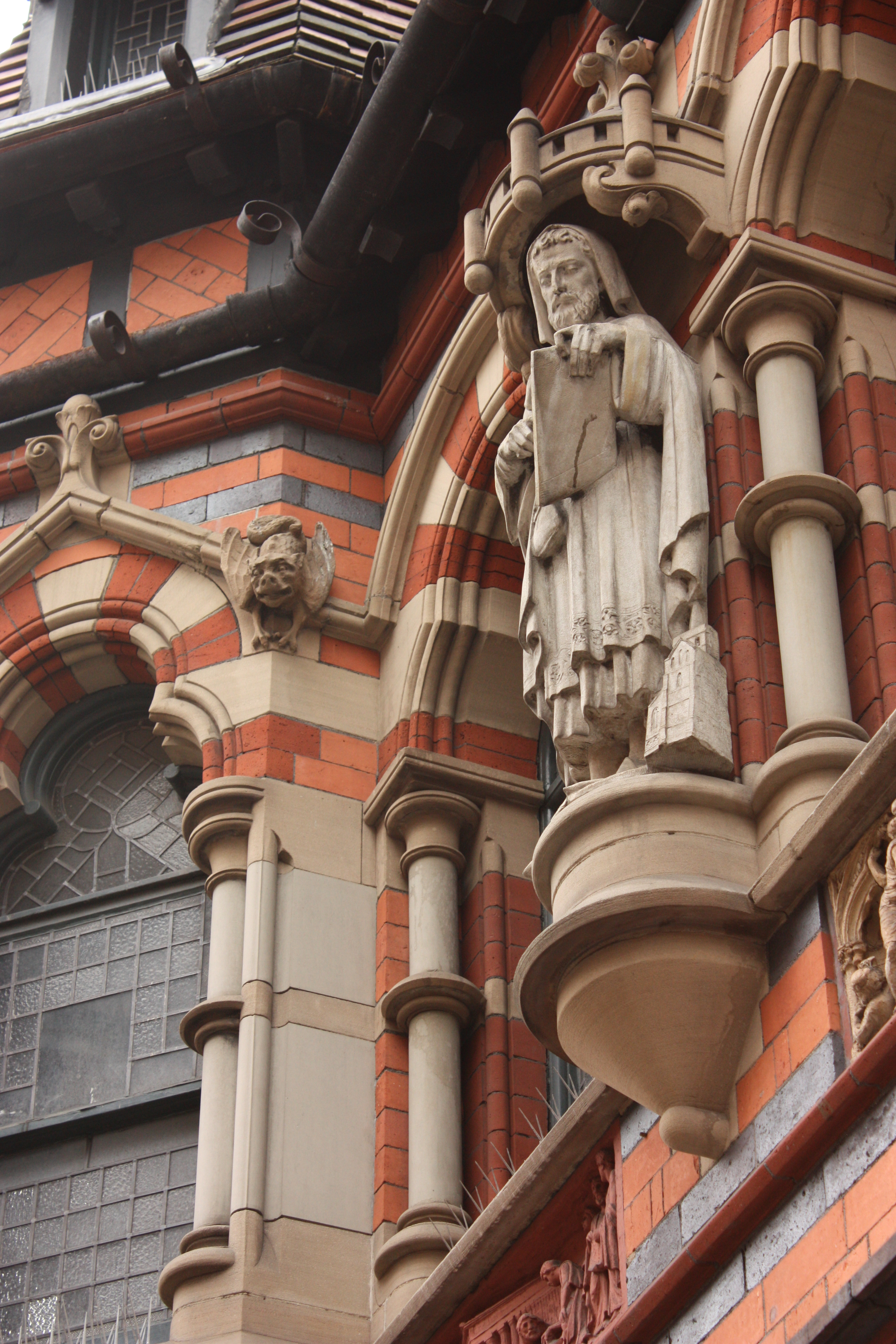
Statue (by Nathaniel Hitch) on the frontage of Watson Fothergill's office

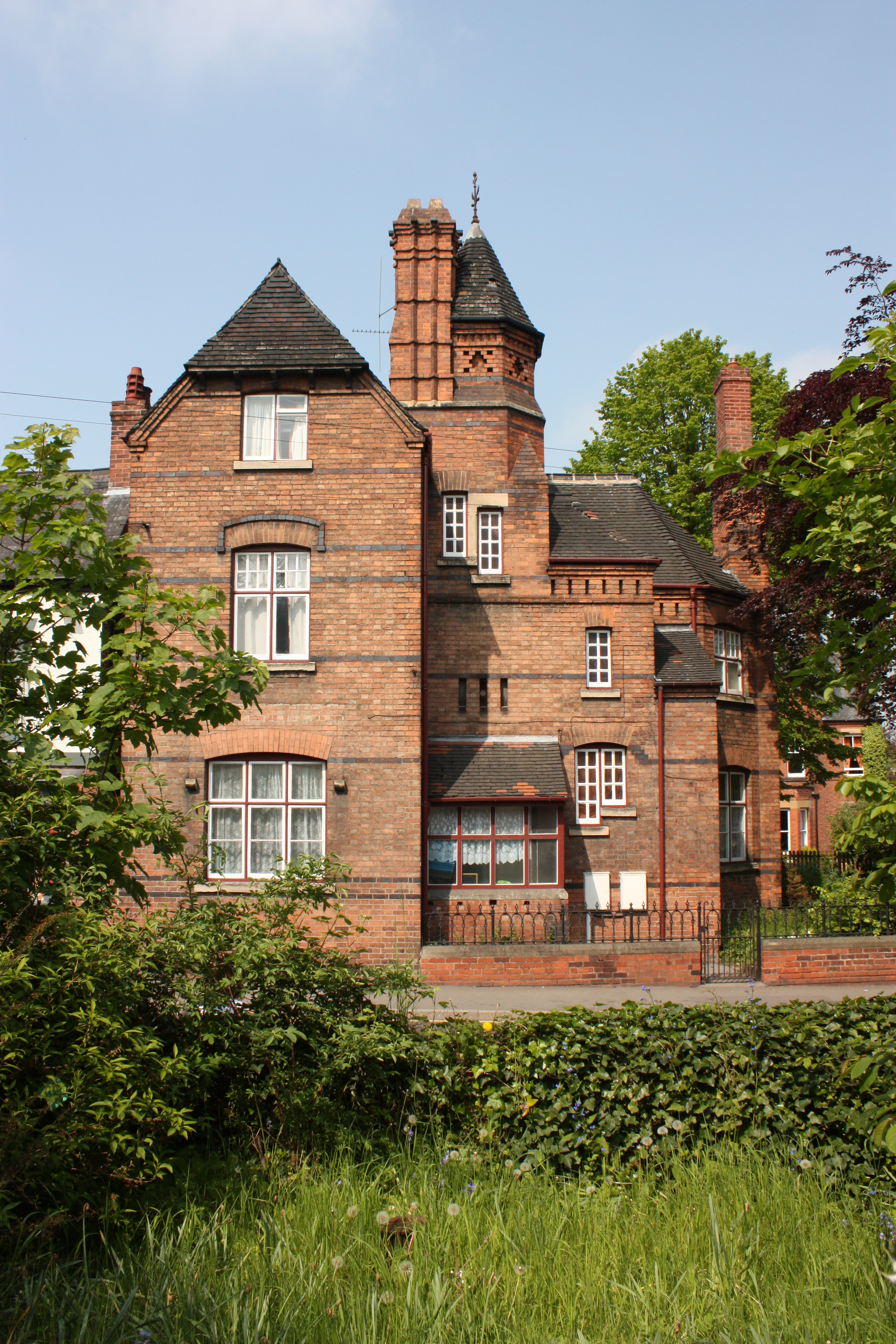
Villa at Bridgegate in Retford

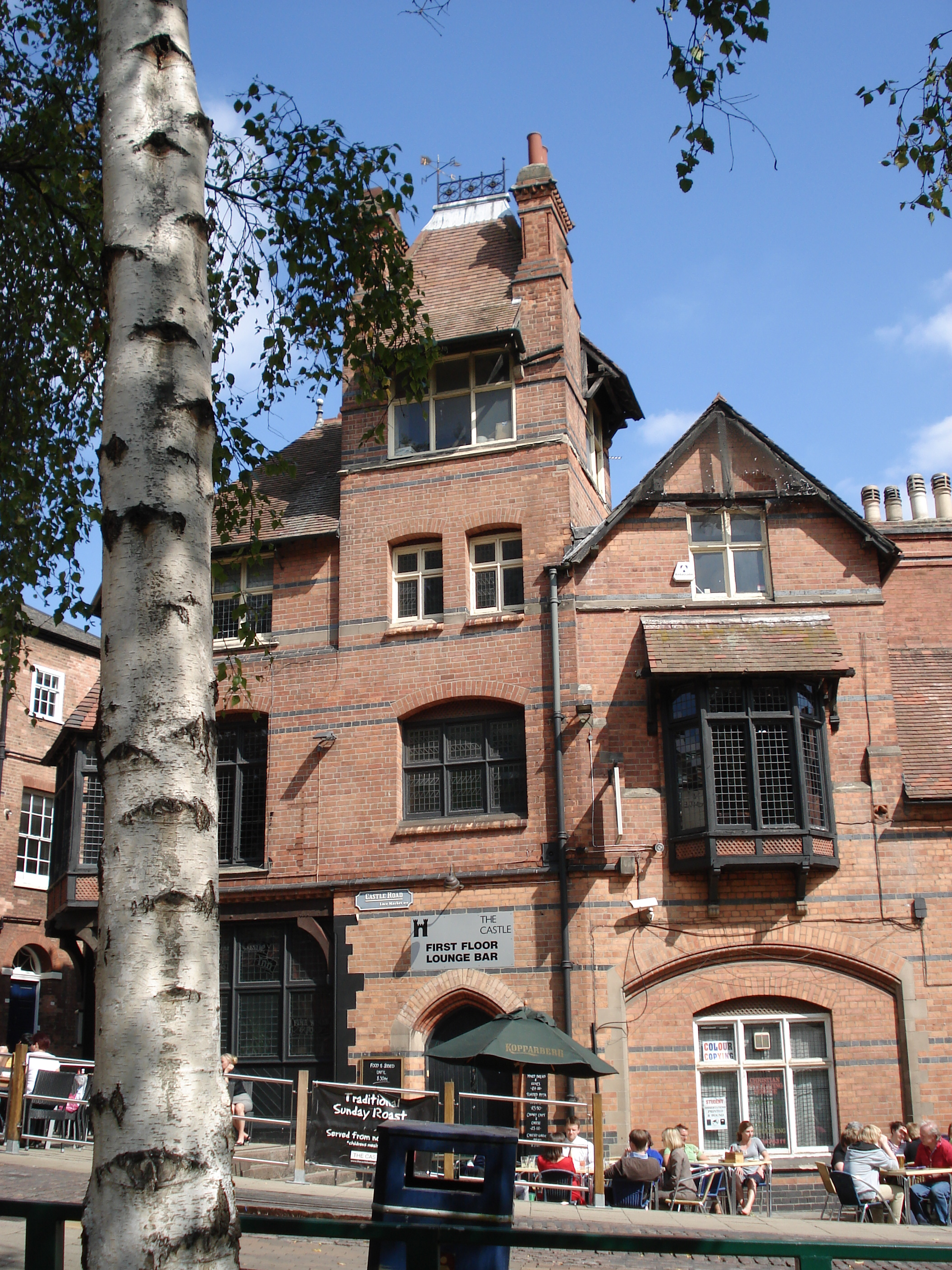
Houses and Shops at Castle Road in Nottingham

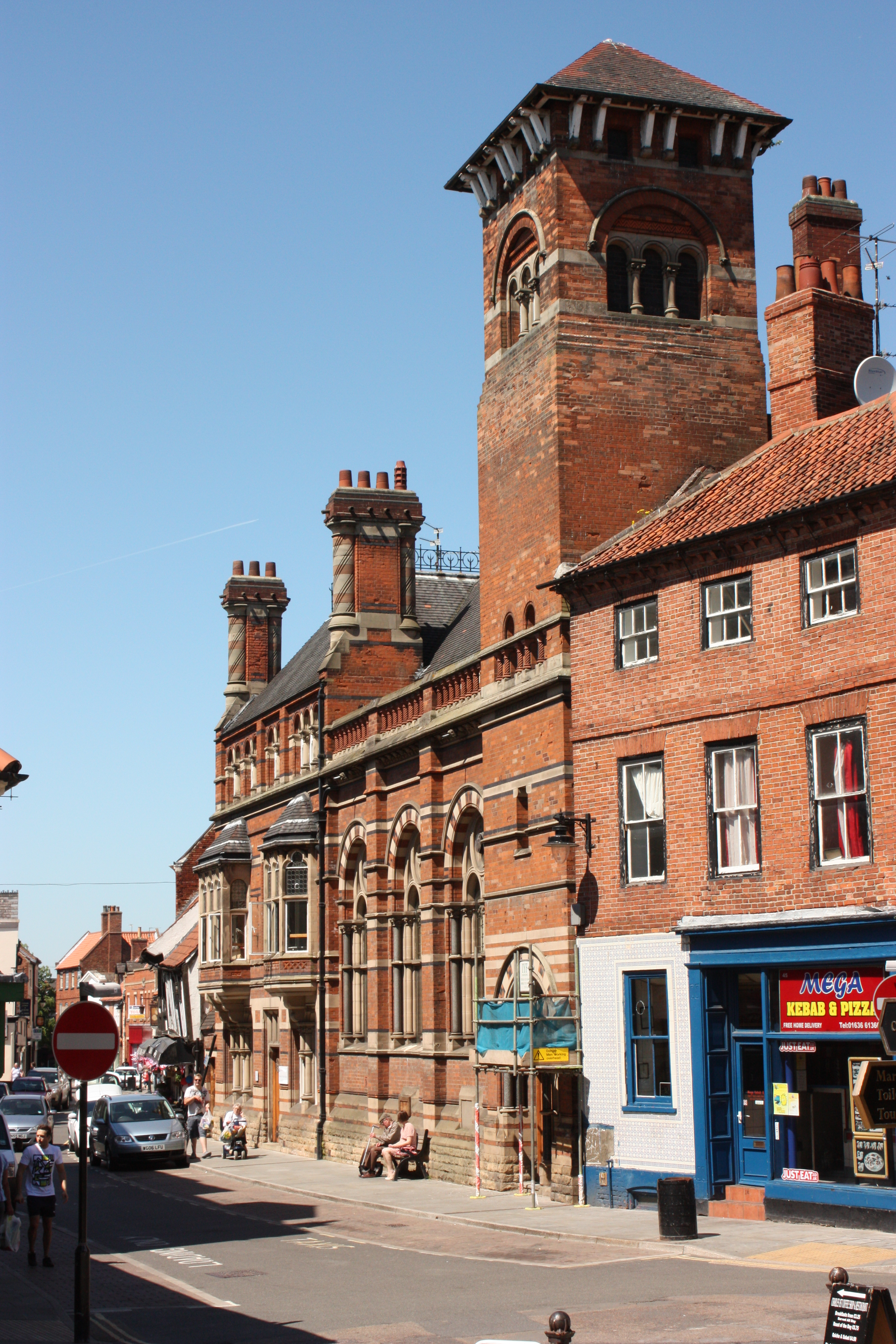
Banking House at Kirkgate in Newark

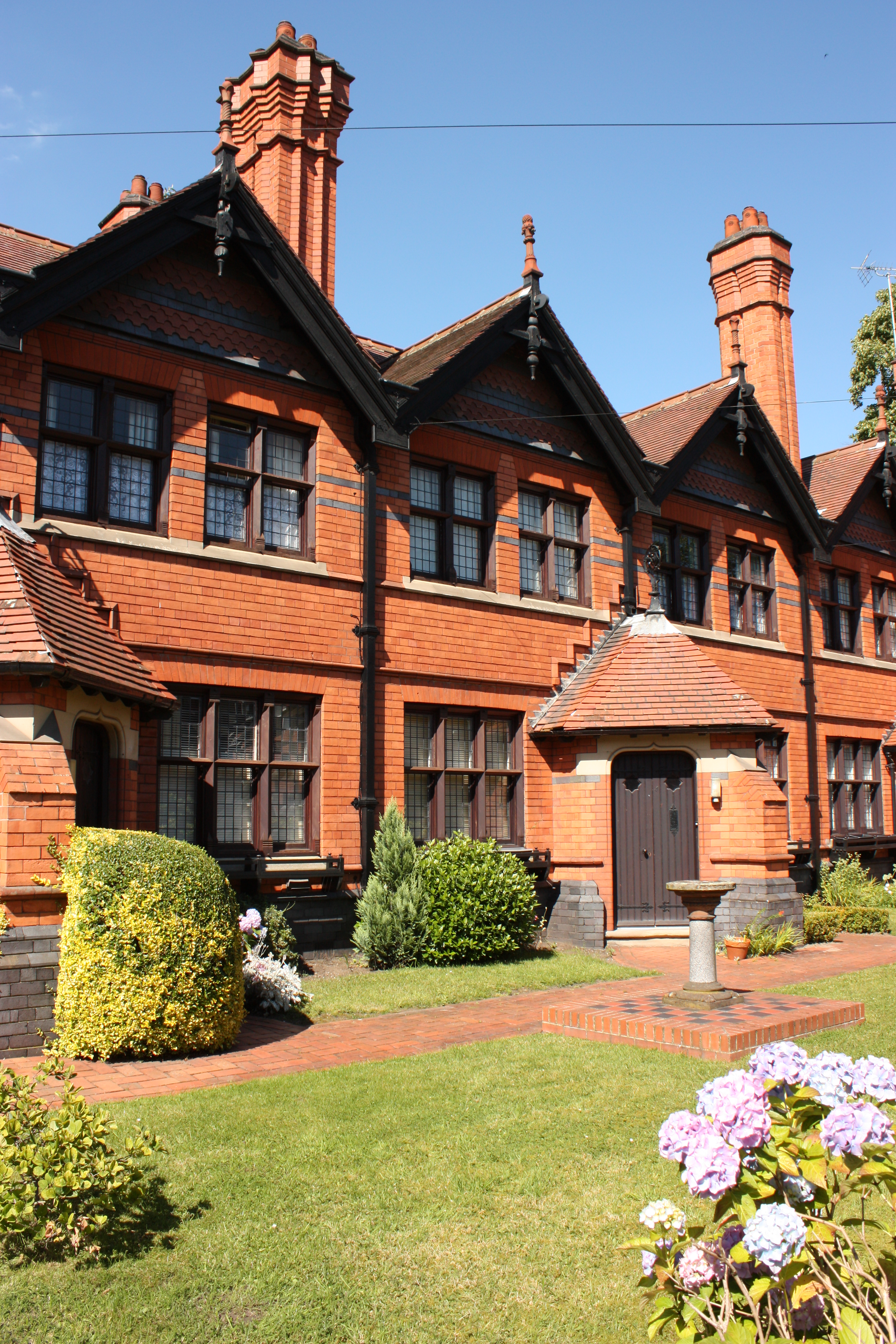
Eight Ladies Homes at Sherwood Rise in Nottingham

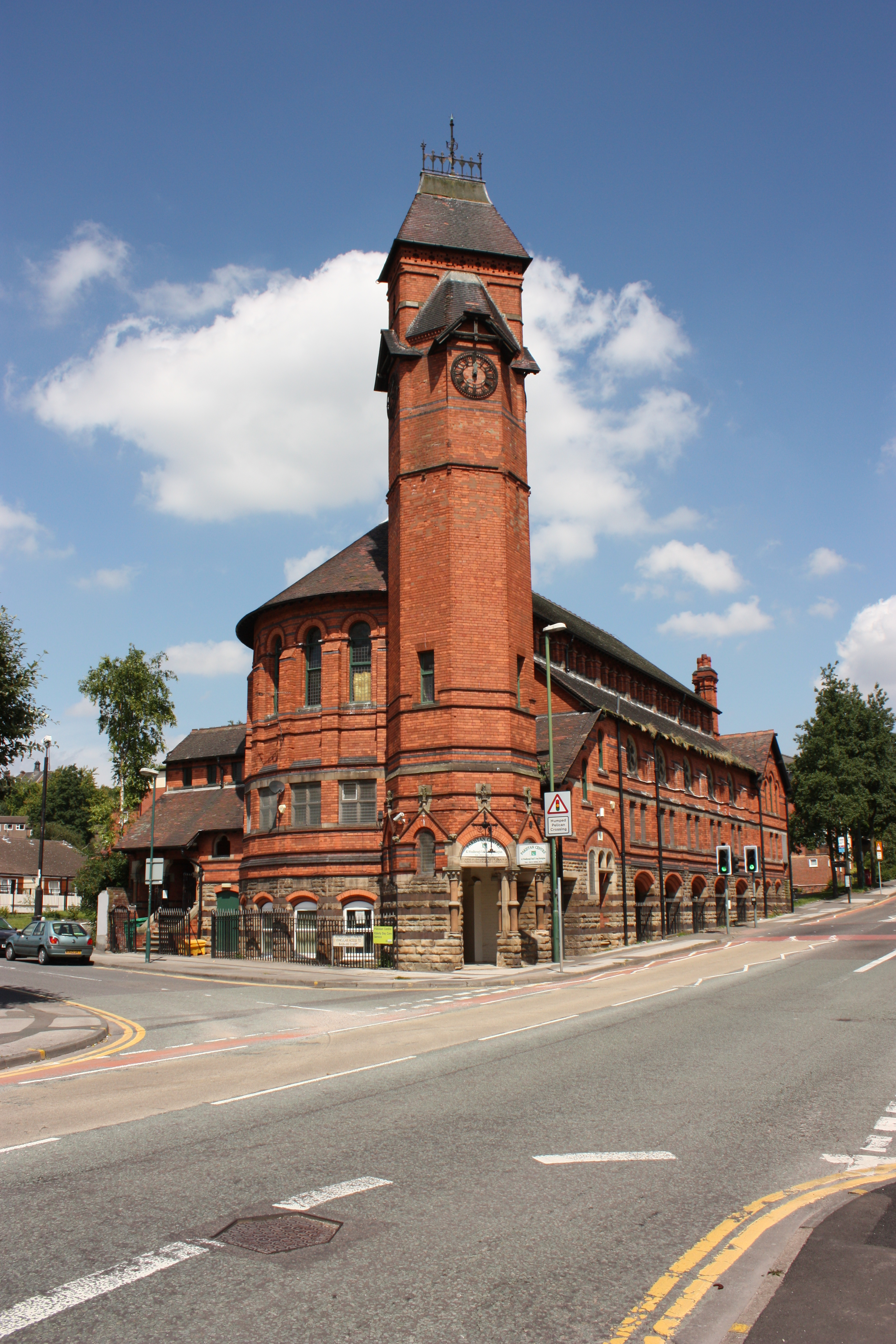
Woodborough Road Baptist Chapel

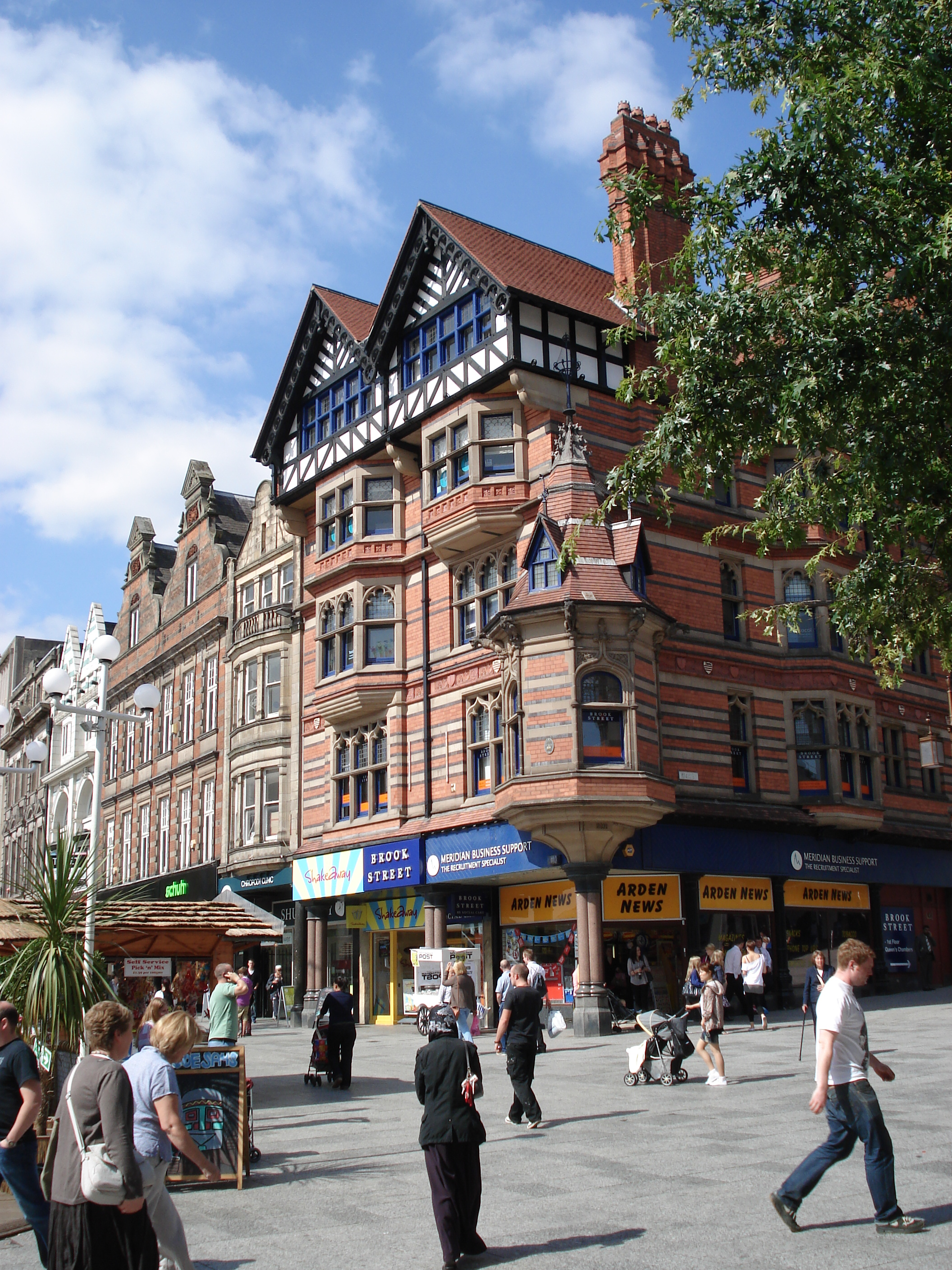
Queen's Chambers at Long Row and King Street in Nottingham

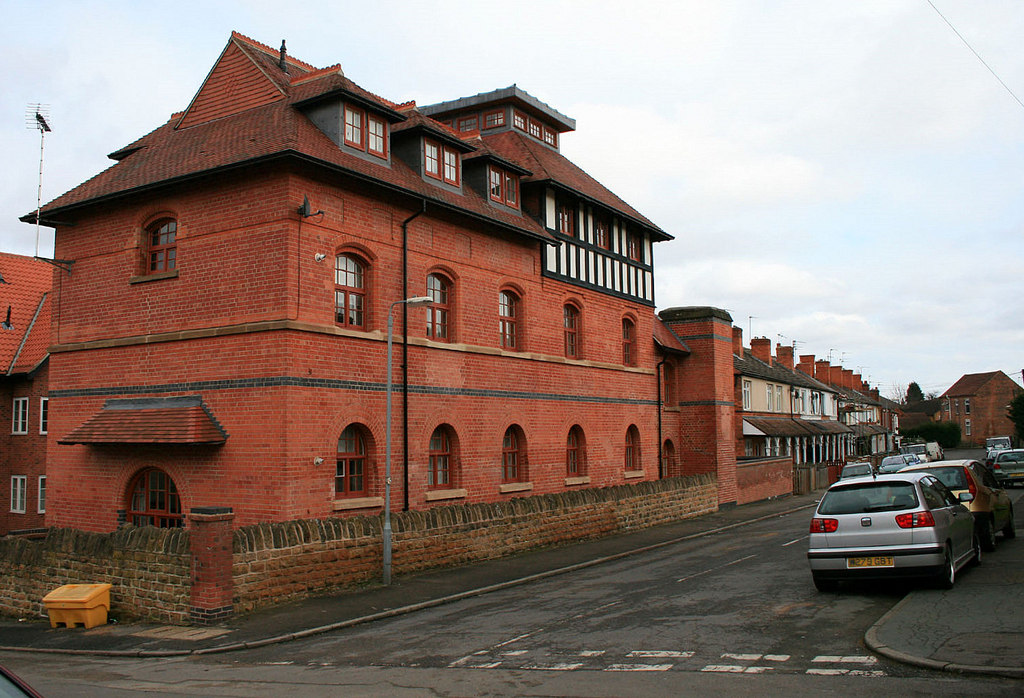
Carlton Laundry

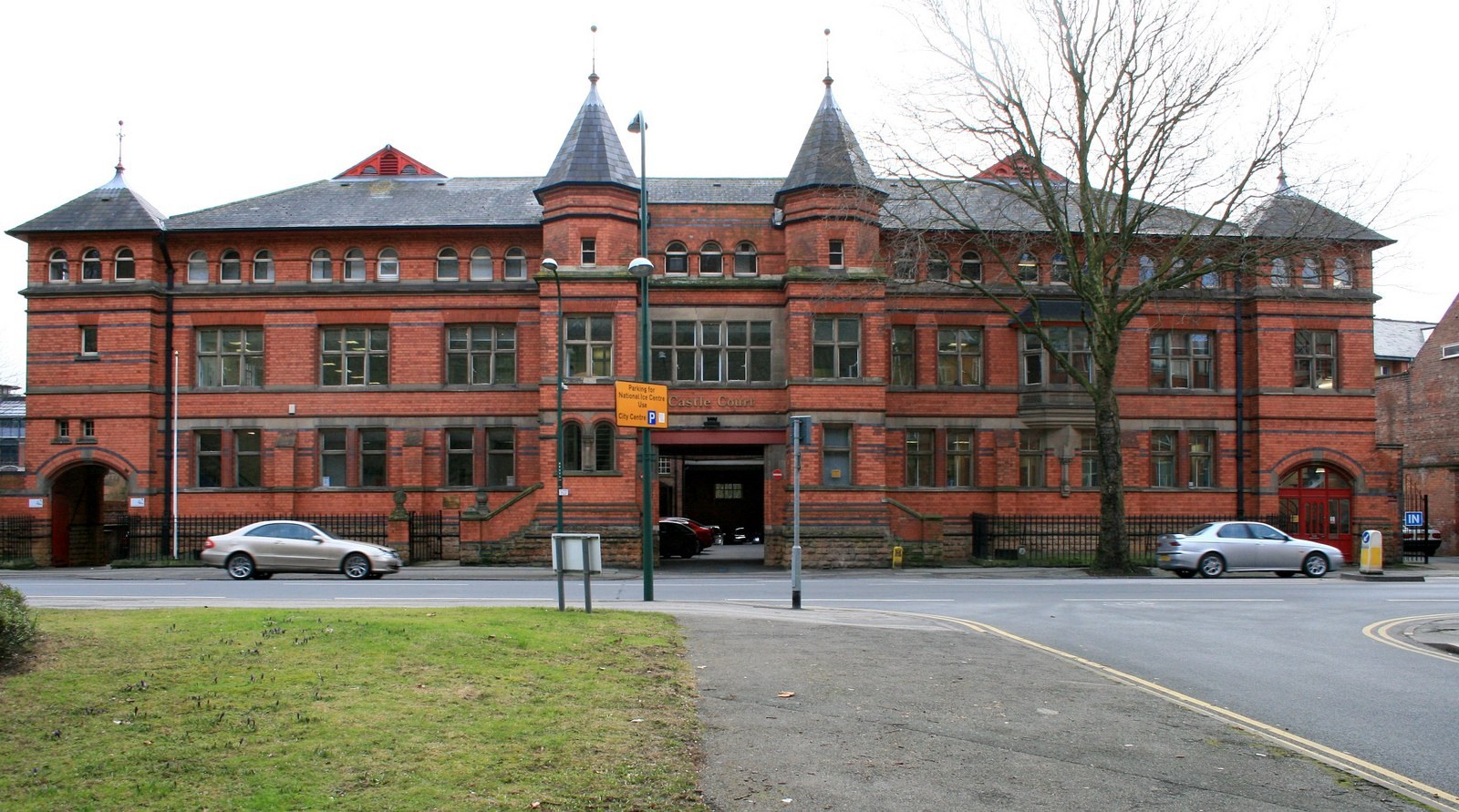
Castle Court, Castle Boulevard

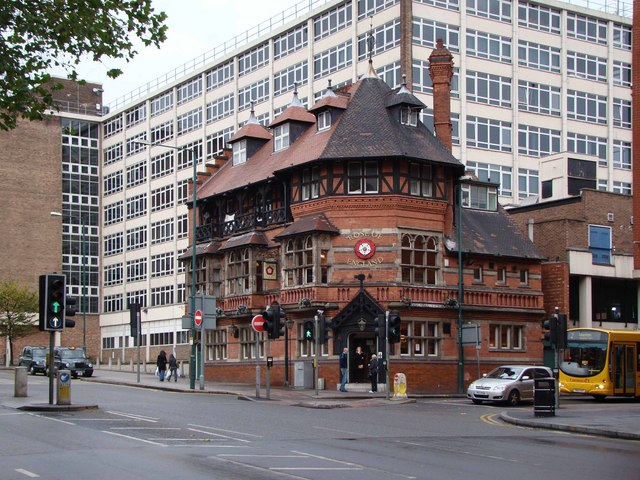
Rose of England public house, Mansfield Road, Nottingham

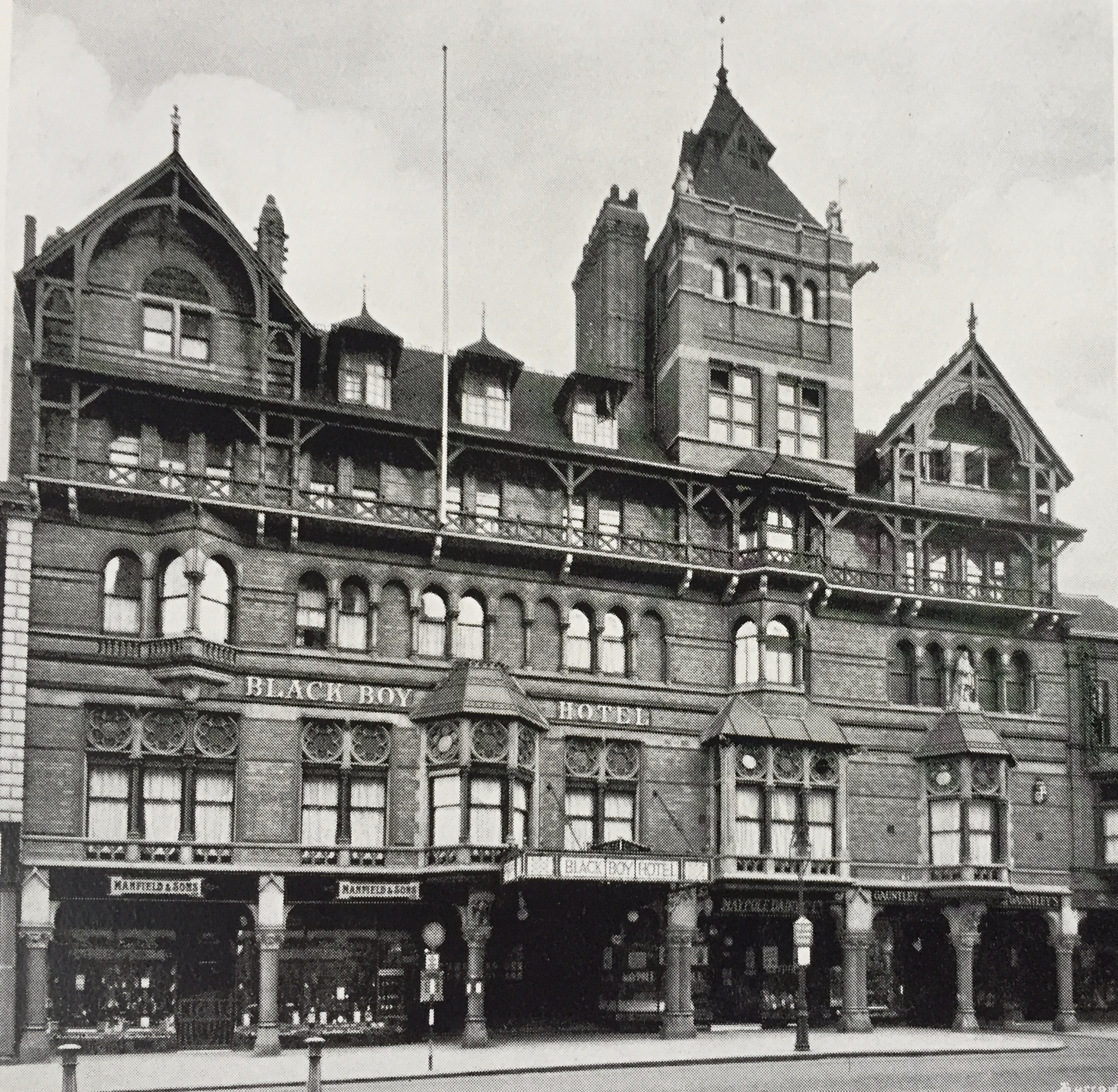
Black Boy Hotel, Long Row, Nottingham
