= Pearsons of Nottingham =

Former department store in Nottingham

Pearson Brothers was a department store located in Nottingham, England, which closed in 1988.

== History ==
Pearson Brothers started out in 1899 when Frederick Pearson bought a former ironmongery store called Wigglesworth based at 56 Long Row, which was rented. Frederick changed the name of the business to Pearsons and employed his two sons, Charles William and Tom, a porter and a small boy. The business not only had a shop but an office and a cellar with a water pump.

By 1894, electricity was being introduced to Nottingham, and Pearsons employed an electrical engineer to do contract work for customers. The store supplemented the electrical contract work by selling electrical goods within the store, becoming an official dealer for many products, including The Hoover Company in 1925. The business was growing quickly and the first of many extensions was built in 1898 at the rear of the store to accommodate a showroom for the new firegrates that the company had designed.

Over the next three decades, the business expanded the store in both size and the goods that it sold. However, the business slumped during the 1920s while the Council House was being built, as did many companies in the vicinity. But, in the 1930s, the business grew again by expanding the store and purchasing a secondhand motor vehicle for deliveries. The gramophone listening room was converted into a café during this decade, and the lease was extended with the property owner, Mr Joseph Darby, in 1934. During the 1930s, Laurie Pearson, son of Tom (one of the Pearson Brothers), invented and patented the first safe and practical electric blanket, while a special lift was added to cope with the different levels of floors.

After the war, the business celebrated its Diamond Jubilee in 1949, and by the end of the 1950s had become an authorised dealer for His Master Voice products from EMI, Coke and Gas burning appliances from East Midlands Gas Board, Redfyre Oil Heaters from Newton, Chambers and Co Ltd, and the sale of Silver from Mappin & Webb, among others. The company was also providing street lighting to the city and fire fighting equipment.

In 1966, the next major development to the store opened, with the new entrance on Upper Parliament Street in a Scandinavian style to try and modernize the firm's appearance. By 1986, the store had a coffee shop and a Planters restaurant, and opened a new £100,000 fashion floor.

== Closure ==
The freeholders for the property where the store was built wanted to redevelop the location as an arcade and gave notice in 1987 to the grandson of the founder Robert Pearson. A fight was put up but unfortunately, by October of that year, the business accepted the offer for the lease. In January 1988, the store closed its doors for the last time, with the loss of 115 jobs.

After the development failed to materialize, it was dropped during 1990 by the owners Grosvenor Properties of London after their plans to demolish the Georgian façade was objected to. In 1993, planning permission was given to turn the site into a multi-storey car park and government offices. By 1996, no work had taken place and a fire destroyed the interiors of the building. The Upper Parliament building was eventually demolished to make way for the multi-storey development, while the Long Row buildings have since been converted into new retail space.
