= Margaret Whinney =

English art historian

- Born: February 4, 1897; United Kingdom of Great Britain and Ireland
- Died: August 29, 1975 (aged 78); United Kingdom of Great Britain and North Ireland
- Education: University of London
- Occupation: Art historian
- Parent(s): Thomas Bostock Whinney; Sydney Margaret Dickens

Margaret Dickens Whinney FBA (4 February 1897 or 1894 – 29 August 1975) was a British art historian who taught at the Courtauld Institute of Art. Her published works included books on British sculpture and architecture.

== Life ==
Whinney was the daughter of Thomas Bostock Whinney, an architect, and Sydney Margaret Dickens, the granddaughter of Charles Dickens. She was educated at the University of London, graduating in art history in 1935. She had published her first article in 1930, under the supervision of her mentor Tancred Borenius.

Immediately after graduating she joined the staff of the recently established Courtauld Institute, where she did a variety of jobs including managing the slide library, and also continued her studies. The Courtauld closed for a year following the beginning of the Second World War. When it reopened in 1940, Whinney was effectively in sole charge, both teaching and handling most of the administrative duties. That year, the research she had done on 17th-century drawings for Whitehall Palace and for Worcester College, Oxford, in the collection at Chatsworth House, was accepted for a D. Litt. at the University of London and published in the Walpole Society yearbook.

She continued to work at the Courtauld after the war, first under the directorship of T. S. R. Boase, and then of Anthony Blunt. Blunt described her lecturing style as "supremely lucid" Whinney was made a Reader in 1950. In the same year she edited a guide to public art collections in the United Kingdom jointly with Blunt. In 1957 she and Oliver Millar co-wrote the volume on the period from 1625 to 1714 for the Oxford History of English Art, Whinney contributing the sections on architecture. Then, commissioned by Nikolaus Pevsner, she wrote the volume on British Sculpture from the Renaissance to the Nineteenth Century for the Pelican History of Art, which appeared in 1964.

She retired from the Courtauld Institute in 1964. She went on to co-write a catalogue of the collection of John Flaxman's models at University College, London, and a book on early Flemish painting. In 1971 she published an introductory volume on Christopher Wren.

She was a vice president of the Society of Antiquaries, secretary and editor to the Walpole Society, a trustee of Sir John Soane's Museum and a member of the Advisory Council of the Victoria and Albert Museum.

== Honours ==
In 1967, Whinney was elected a Fellow of the British Academy (FBA).

== Publications ==
- The Nation's Pictures: a Guide to the Chief National and Municipal Picture Galleries of England, Scotland and Wales (with Anthony Blunt, 1950).
- English Art, 1625–1714 (with Oliver Millar, 1957), as part of the "Oxford History of English Art" .
- Sculpture in Britain, 1530–1830 (1964), as part of the "Pelican History of Art" .
- Early Flemish Painting (1968).
- The Collection of Models by John Flaxman (with Rupert Gunnis, 1967).
- English Sculpture 1720–1830 (1971).
- Christopher Wren (1971)

== See also ==
- Women in the art history field
