= Nottingham Daily Express =

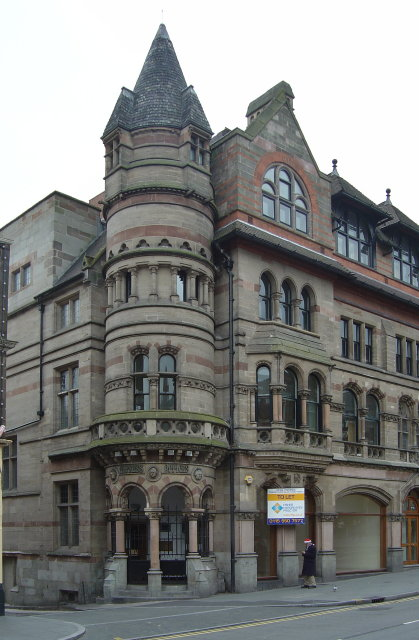
Former offices of the Nottingham Daily Express, Upper Parliament Street, Nottingham

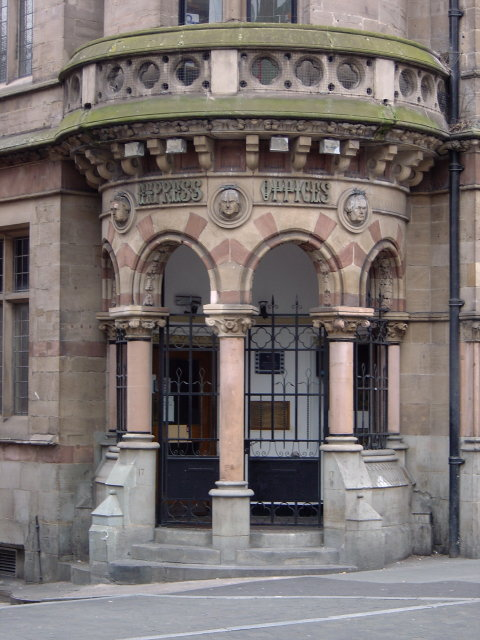
Main entrance with the heads of the Liberal leaders

The Nottingham Daily Express was a local newspaper published in Nottingham between 1860 and 1918. It was a radical, Liberal and strongly Nonconformist newspaper.

== History ==
It was published from 4 January 1860 to 6 April 1918. It continued as the Nottingham Journal and Express 8 April 1918 – 5 September 1953 (incorporating the long dormant copyright of the Nottingham Journal which had been purchased from William Bradshaw in 1887). It was amalgamated with the Nottingham Guardian and subsequently published as the Guardian Journal.

The Nottingham Daily Express was based in a building on Upper Parliament Street in Nottingham designed by the Nottingham-based architect Watson Fothergill. The ethos of the paper was marked by the inclusion over the door of images of the Liberal politicians Richard Cobden, William Gladstone and John Bright. With their prominence as leaders of the Anti-Corn Law League (1838–46) these were suitable subjects for the Liberal newspaper to commemorate. Inside the entrance are rows of tiles (originally on the Parliament Street front). The first row depicts Queen Victoria and Prince Albert, while the second row shows Lord Palmerston and Lord John Russell.

The building was completed in 1876 with three floors. In 1899 it was extended towards King Street and a fourth floor added.
