= Bromley and Watkins =

Architectural practice

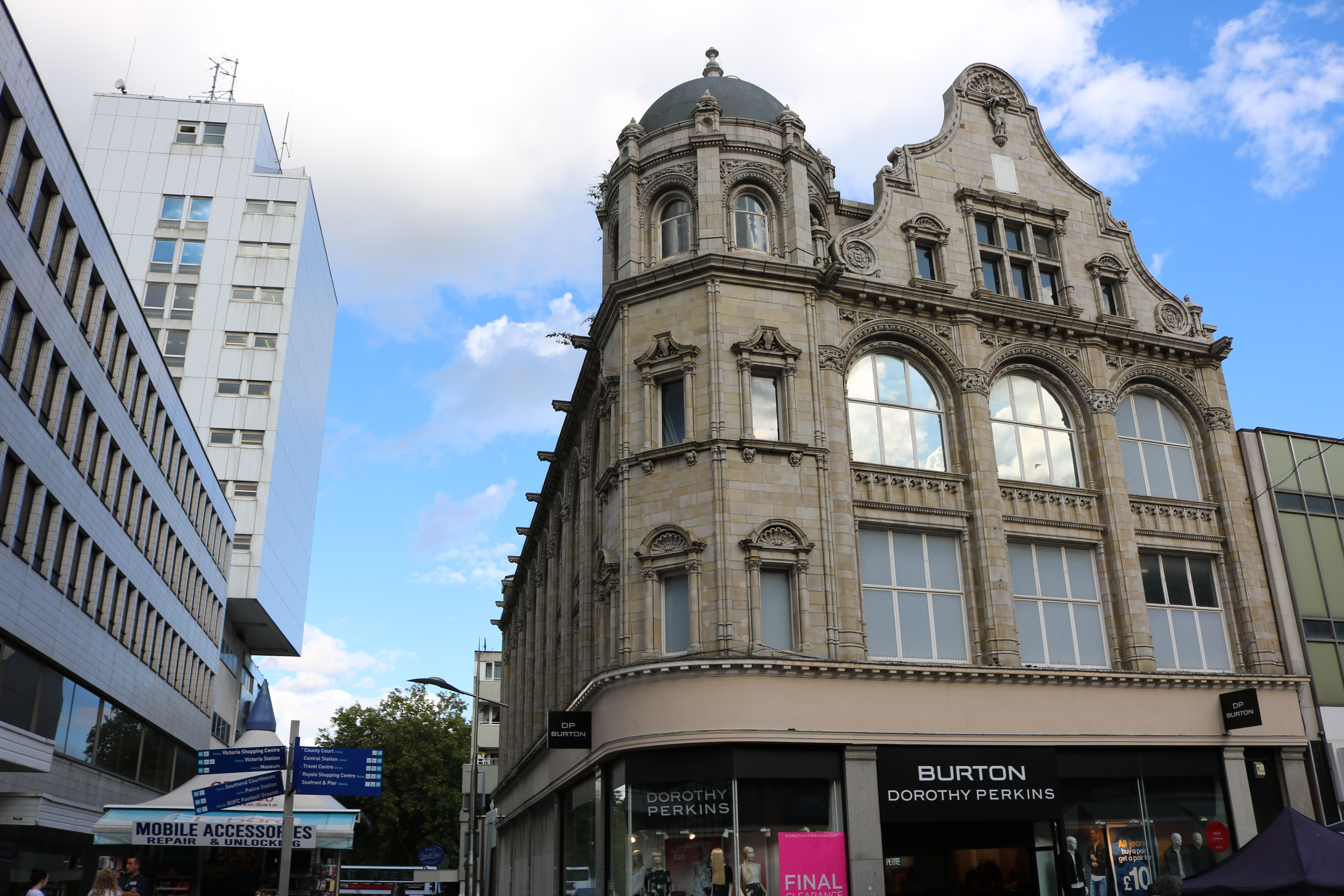
130 High Street, Southend-on-Sea 1915

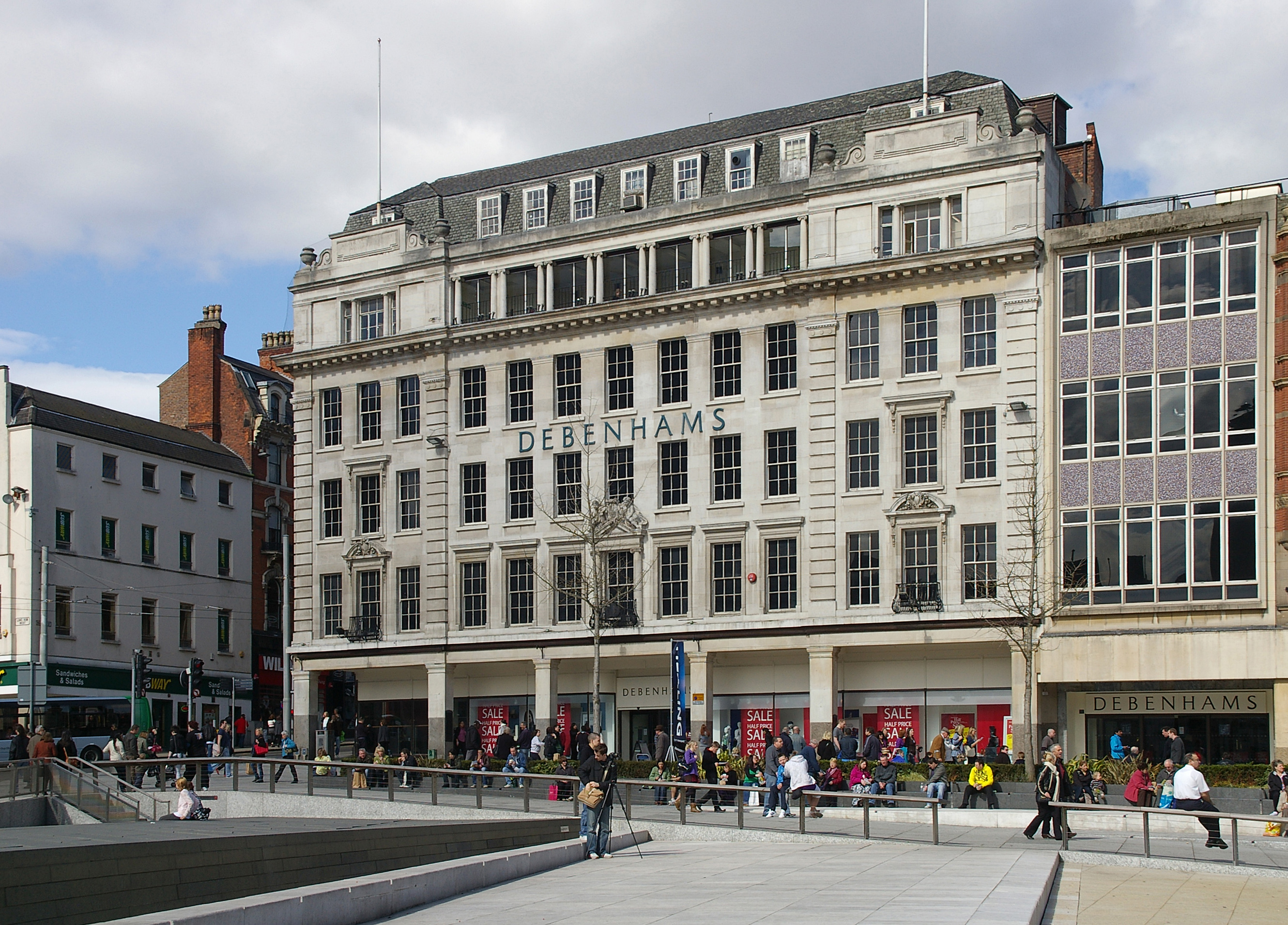
Former Griffin and Spalding department store, Long Row, Nottingham 1919-20 and 1927

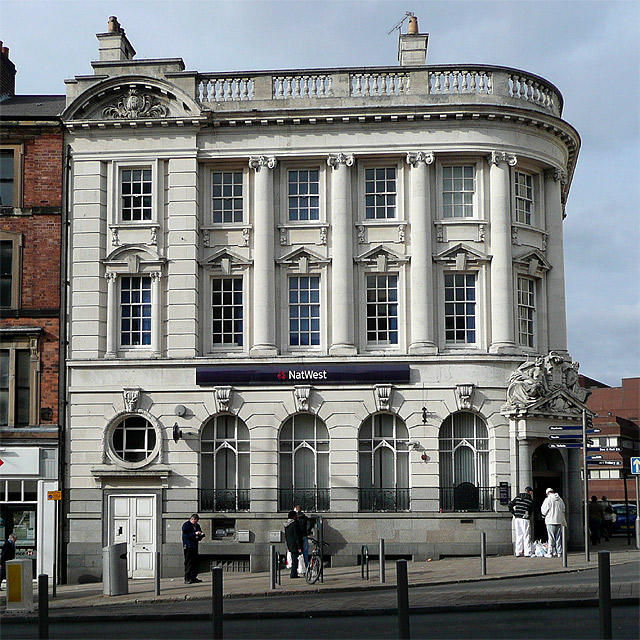
Former National Provincial Bank, Wolverhampton

Bromley and Watkins was an architectural practice based in Nottingham from 1912 to 1928.

== History ==
Albert Nelson Bromley and Harry Garnham Watkins established the practice in Nottingham in 1912. Harry Garnham Watkins was the son of William Watkins, an architect from Lincoln. The partnership was dissolved in 1928 when Harry Garnham Watkins retired.

== Works ==
- Boots the Chemist Factory, Station Street, Nottingham 1912
- Boots the Chemist, Northgate, Gloucester 1914
- Boots the Chemist, 130 High Street, Southend-on-Sea 1915
- Boots the Chemist, 7 & 8 Pride Hill, Shrewsbury 1915
- Griffin & Spalding department store, Long Row, Nottingham 1919-20 and 1927 (later Debenhams)
- National Provincial Bank, 11 Smithy Row, Nottingham 1927-28
- National Provincial Bank, Wolverhampton
- Convalescent home for boys, Rosebery Avenue, Skegness 1928
