= Long Row =

Street in Nottingham, England

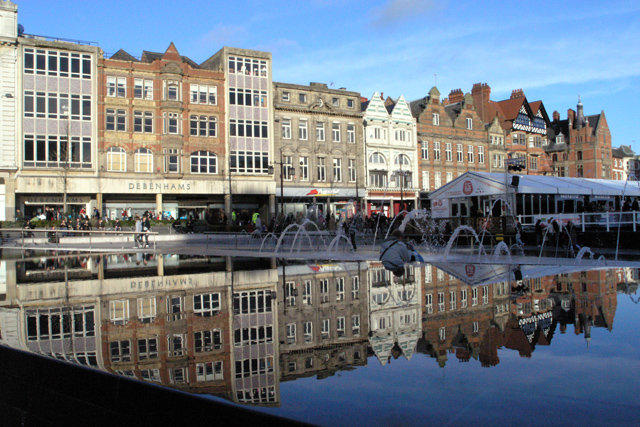
- The middle section of Long Row, Nottingham

- Location within Nottingham
- Maintained by: Nottingham City Council
- Coordinates: 52.9538°N 1.1505°W

Long Row is a row of retail buildings in Nottingham City Centre forming the north side of Old Market Square, Nottingham.

== Notable buildings ==
=== Long Row West ===
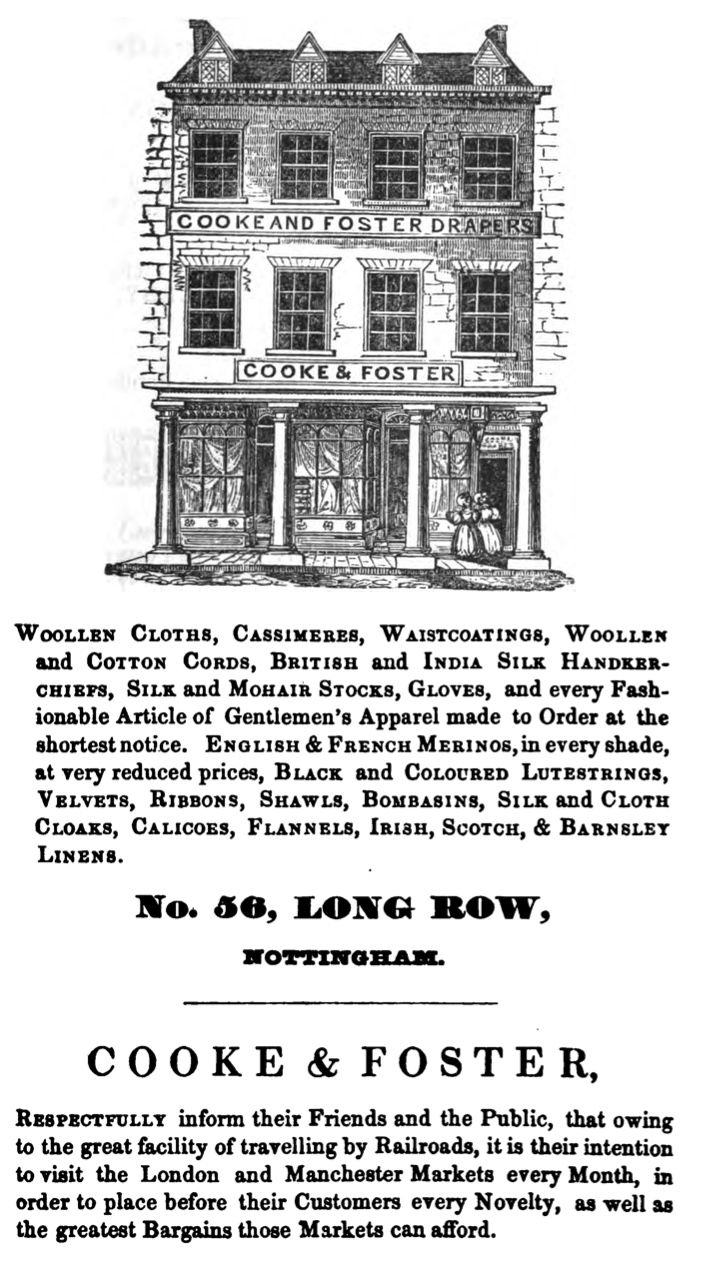
Cooke and Foster at 56 Long Row in 1840

- 70 West End Arcade 1920s
- 67 The Dragon by John Henry Statham. 1879. This was originally a house dating from 1615 (possibly the first brick building in Nottingham), which evolved into a tavern named the George and Dragon. In 1865 it was taken over by Greenall Whitley and remained under ownership in 1991. It reopened as The Dragon in 1994.
- 65-66 Pepe's Piri Piri
- 65A City Centre Apartments
- 62-64 Tesco
- 61 Maryland Chicken
- 60 Chatime
- 58 and 59
- 56 facades of 3 former merchants' houses dating from 1705, 1720 and 1740. Cooke and Foster ca 1840. From ca 1920 it housed Pearson's department store. (Habitat in 2016, KFC from September 2020)
- 52 late 18th century house, now converted for retail use. (British Heart Foundation charity shop in 2016)
- 50 and 51 late 18th century (British Heart Foundation in 2016)
- 49 The Talbot, William Arthur Heazell and Sons 1876-78 (Yates Wine Lodge from 1928 to 2019, Slug and Lettuce from 2019)
- 48 (Subway from ?-2020. Falafel's from 2021.)

=== Long Row ===
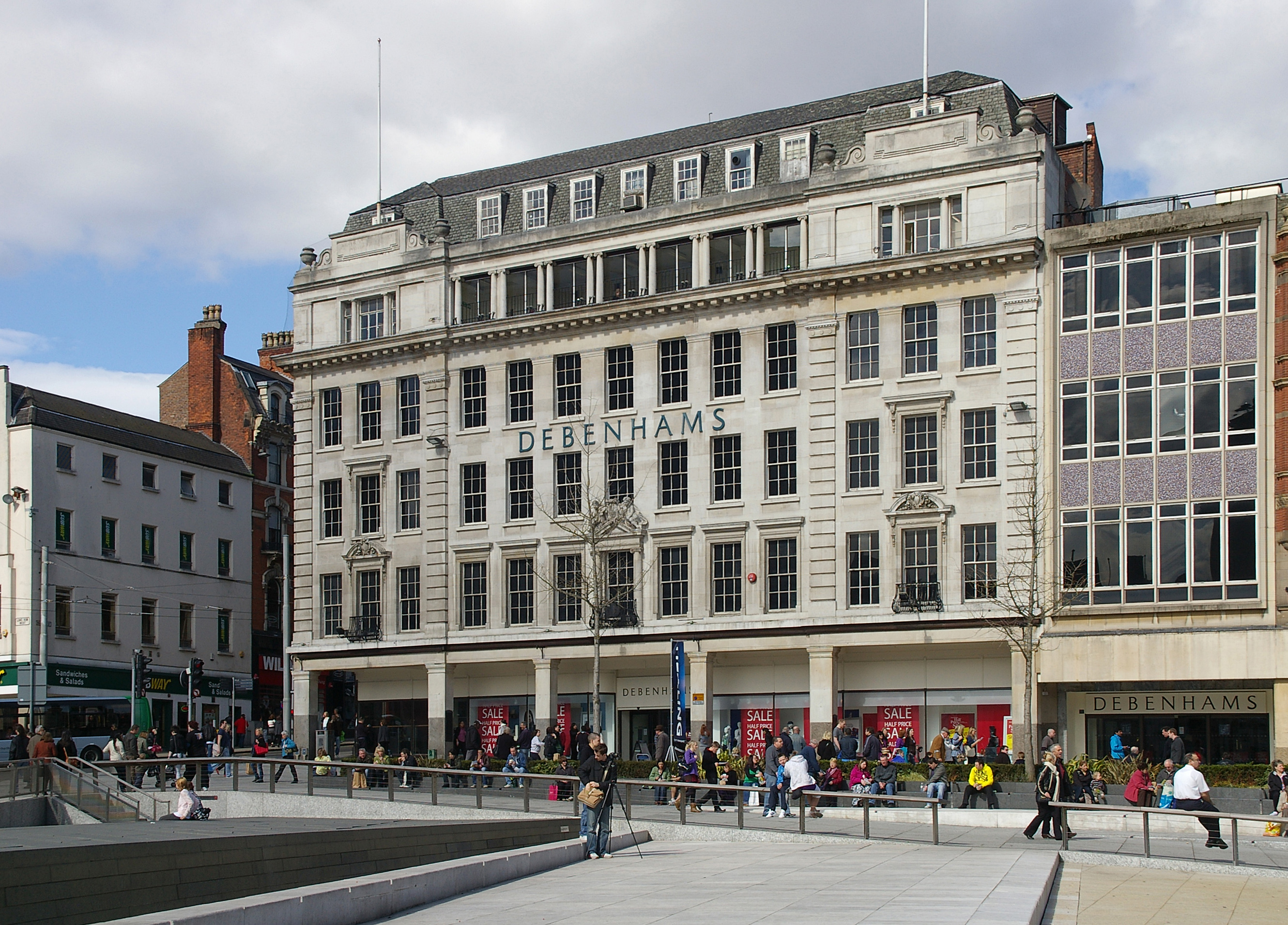
Debenhams 1927

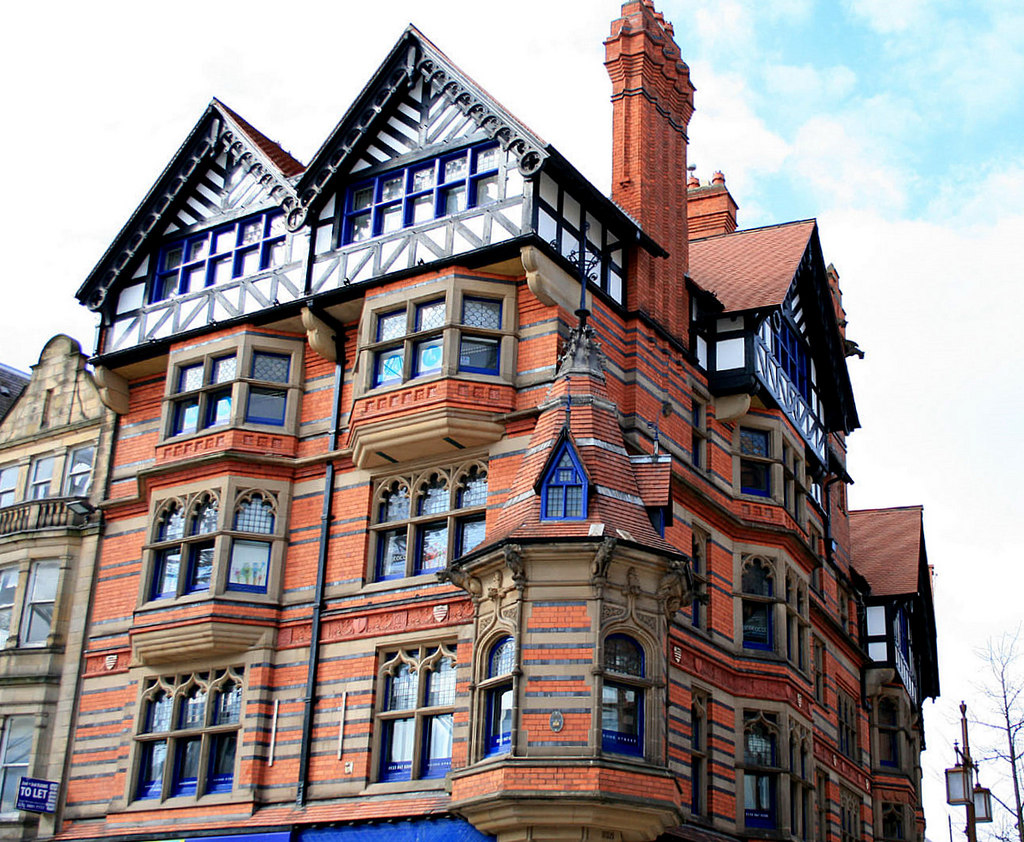
Queen's Chambers, 1897

- Griffin & Spalding Bromley and Watkins 1927 (Debenhams until May 2021)
- Extension to Griffin & Spalding, refronted Mikado Cafe.
- Griffin & Spalding Bromley and Watkins 1919-20 (Debenhams until May 2021)
- Griffin & Spalding William Dymock Pratt 1893-96 (Debenhams until May 2021)
- Griffin & Spalding Bromley and Watkins 1919-20 (Debenhams until May 2021)
- 34 and 35 William Arthur Heazell and Sons 1910 (Five Guys in 2016)
- 33 Provincial Cinematograph Theatre by Naylor and Sale 1912, later a Lyons' Tea Room. (Ladbrokes in 2016.)
- 29 and 31 Ram Commercial Hotel, rebuilt by Arthur Brewill and Basil Baily 1899 for the Providence Estates Company. Remodelled by the same architects in 1908 for Liptons Ltd. (MOD Pizza 2016-2020)
- 27 Shop by J.W.J. Barnes 1902 for Charles Hibbert. (Shuropody in 2016)
- 25 and 26. Queen's Chambers, Shops and offices by Watson Fothergill 1897 for E.W. Skipwith. (Shakeaway, Nottingham Doughnut and Raithbys newsagent in 2016)

=== Long Row East ===
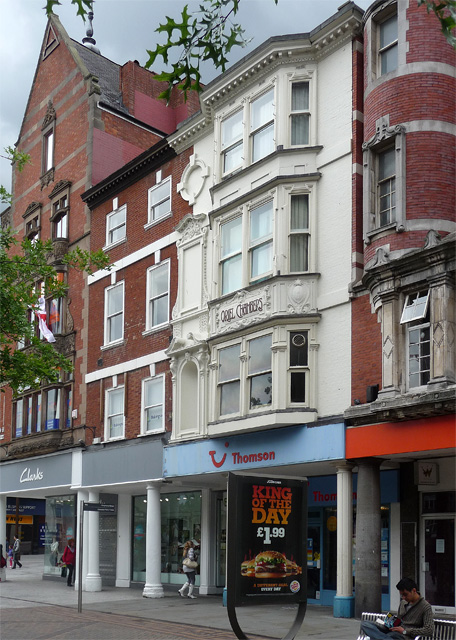
Oriel Chambers, 1905-06

- 22 Russell Chambers, Marshall and Turner 1895 (Clarks in 2016)
- 21 Clarks
- 20 Oriel Chambers, William Arthur Heazell and Sons 1905-06 (Rush Hair in 2016)
- 17-18 Alexander Ellis Anderson 1924 (Cooperative Travel in 2016)
- 15-16 London, City and Midland Bank. Thomas Bostock Whinney 1911 (Jem Leisure in 2016)
- 14 The Works
- 6-12 Primark (site of the former Black Boy Hotel, built as a branch of Littlewoods in 1970.)
- 4-5 Ann Summer and Thomson, a building designed by Thomas Cecil Howitt.
- 1-3 Three and Thomas Cook, built on the site of Skinner & Rook Wine Merchants.
