= Queen's Chambers, Nottingham =

Building in Nottingham, England

Coordinates: 52°57′13.3″N 1°8′59″W

Queen’s Chambers, Nottingham
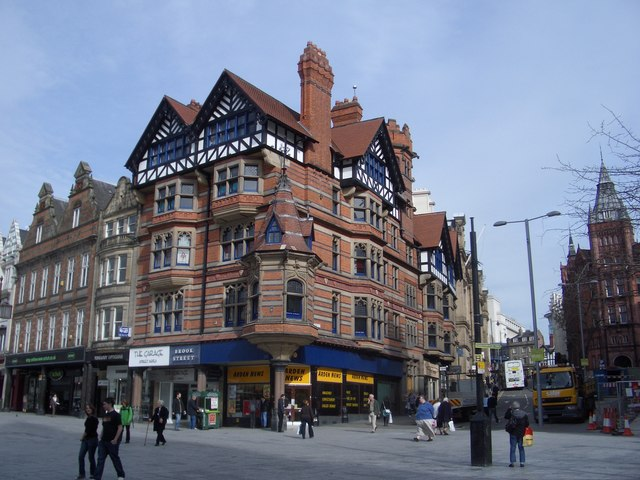
- Queen’s Chambers, 1-7 King Street, Nottingham

- Location within Nottingham

General information
- Location: 1-7 King Street, Nottingham
- Completed: 1897

Design and construction
- Architect: Fothergill Watson
- Designations: Grade II listed

Queen's Chambers is a Grade II listed building on Long Row and King Street in Nottingham.

== History ==
It was constructed in 1897 to the designs of local architect Fothergill Watson for Edward Skipwith, a wine merchant, in the Tudorbeathan Gothic style. Edward Skipwith was a long-standing merchant operating from premises on Long Row, and he rebuilt this building as he retired, possibly as a retirement investment. It comprised 4 shops with offices above.

In 1993 the building underwent a £500,000 refurbishment lasting six months by Thomas Fish. This project won the 1993 Lord Mayor's Urban Design Award.

== See also ==
- Listed buildings in Nottingham (Bridge ward)
