= Griffin & Spalding =

Former department store in Nottingham

Coordinates: 52°57′11.9″N 1°9′1.9″W

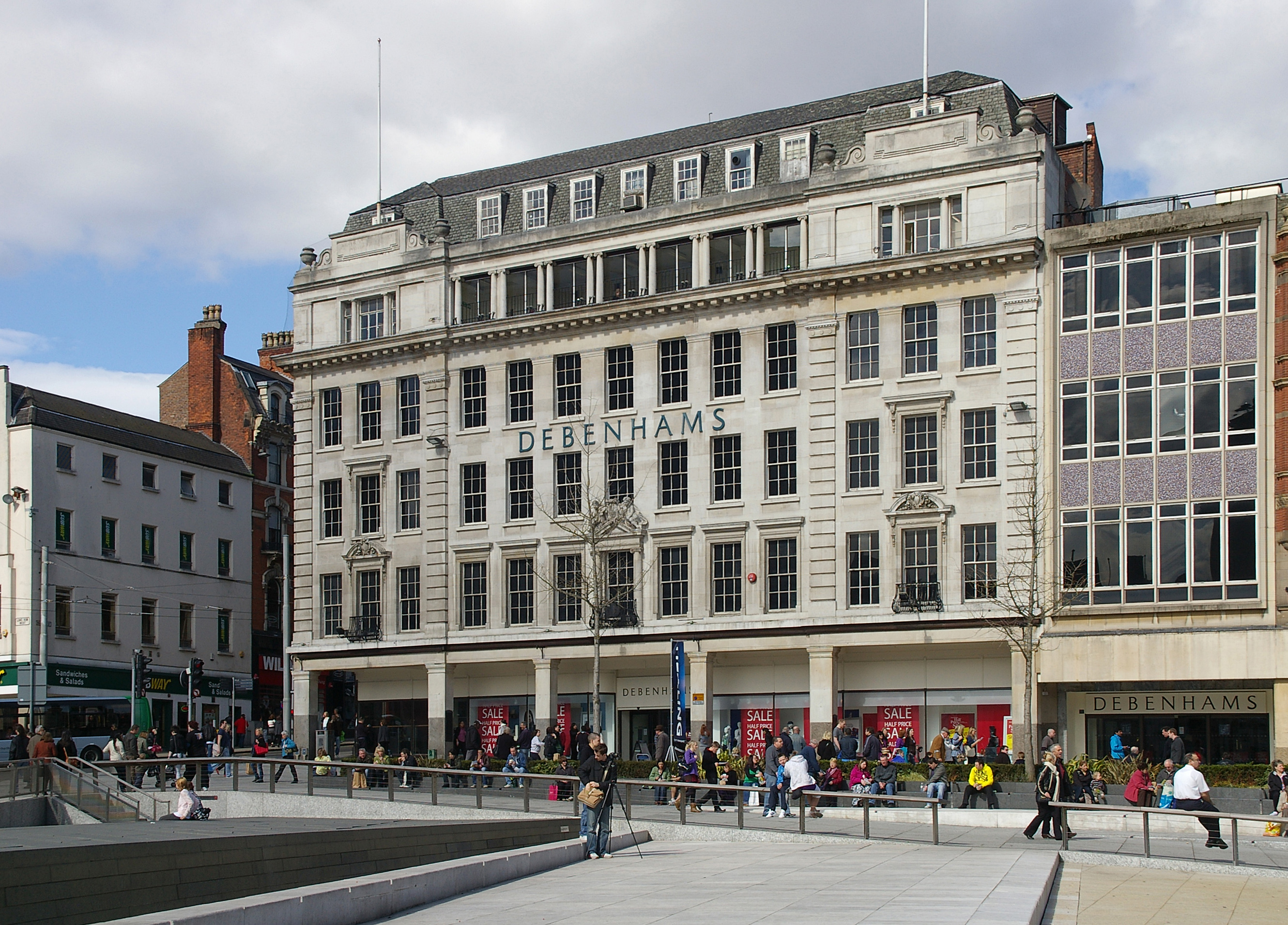
- Former Griffin and Spalding department store, Long Row, Nottingham
- Company type: Private (1846–1944); Subsidiary (1944–1973)
- Industry: Retailing
- Founded: 1846; 180 years ago
- Founders: Edward and Robert Dickinson
- Defunct: 1973; 53 years ago
- Fate: Re-branded as Debenhams
- Successor: Debenhams
- Headquarters: Nottingham, United Kingdom
- Products: Clothing and Department
- Revenue: See parent company
- Net income: See parent company
- Parent: Debenhams plc (1944–present)

Griffin & Spalding was a department store located in Nottingham. It later became part of the Debenhams chain.

== History ==
The store was started in 1846 by brothers Edward and Robert Dickinson as a drapery store on the corner of Market Street and Long Row. The store changed hand before Messrs W. Griffin and J.T. Spalding purchased the business in 1878. Mr Spalding had trained at the well known London department store Marshall & Snelgrove, and by 1888 had grown the business sufficiently enough to expand the business by purchasing neighbouring stores in Market Street and Long Row. In 1924, the stores façade was rebuilt by Bromley and Watkins with Portland stone, which hid the different buildings that lay behind (in 1978 there were 37 trading floors!).

The business continued to be managed by the Griffin and Spalding families, with William A & Harold Spalding and Percy Griffin, the sons of the original owners running the day-to-day business. The company had a variety of department, selling furnishings, clothes and household goods with the promise of offering 10 shillings to the first person who informed them that a competitor was selling an item cheaper. Another part of the business was providing furniture and fittings to cinemas, with a factory on Rutland Street providing interiors for theatres such as the Savoy (on Derby Road) and the Curzon (Mansfield Road).

In 1944 the family accepted an offer from Debenhams, who continued to trade under the Griffin and Spalding name until 1973, when the business was changed to Debenhams as part of a national re-branding scheme. The store has been refurbished three times under the management of Debenhams, firstly in 1951 followed by 1988 and 1998 and was still part of the Debenhams group until its demise.
