= Watson Fothergill's offices =

Building in Nottingham, England

Coordinates: 52°57′16.3″N 1°8′43.2″W

Watson Fothergill’s office
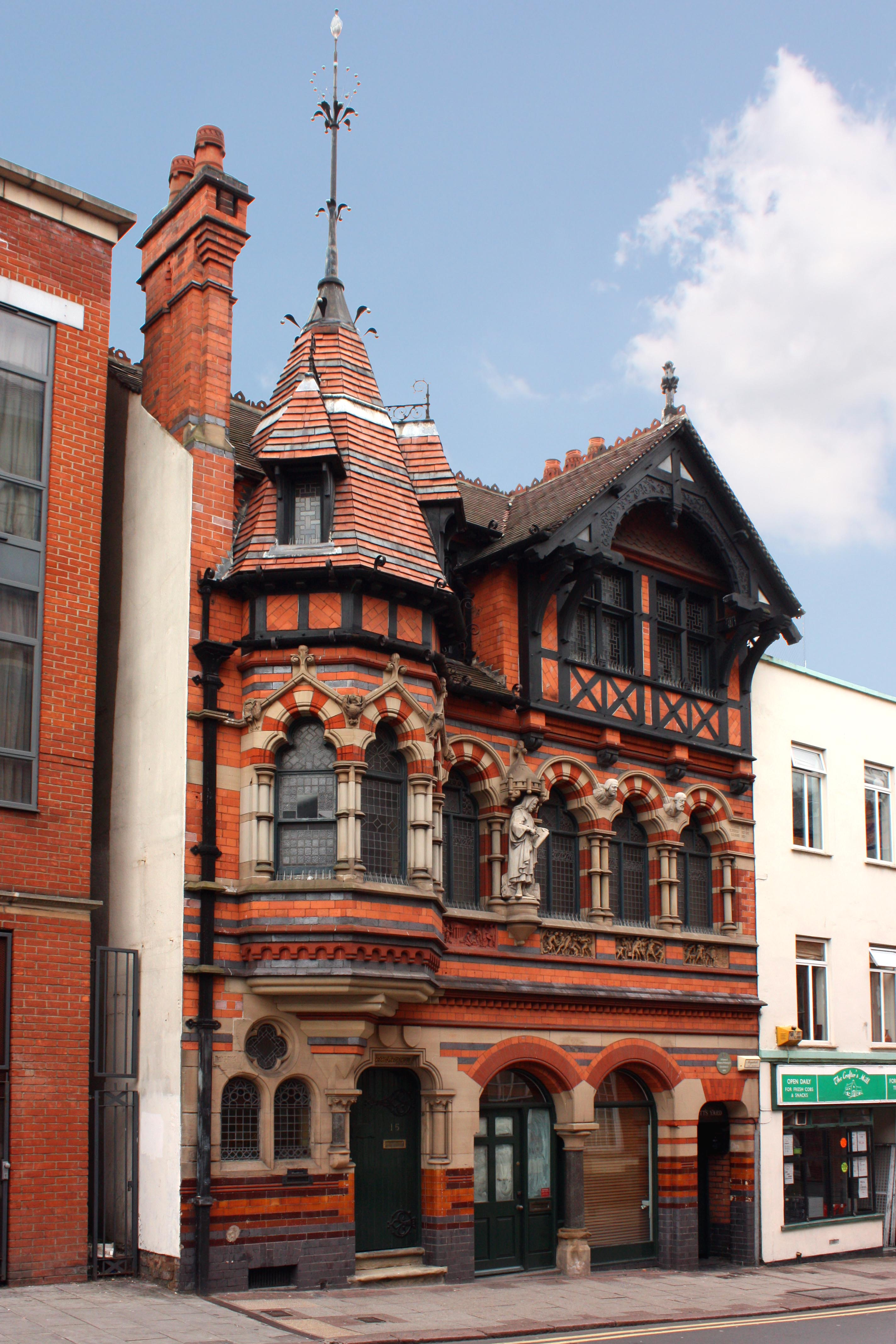

- Location within Nottingham

General information
- Location: 15-17 George Street, Nottingham
- Opened: 1895

Design and construction
- Architect: Watson Fothergill
- Designations: Grade II listed

Watson Fothergill’s office is a Grade II listed building in George Street, Nottingham.

== History ==
The arrival of the Great Central Railway in Nottingham resulted in the relocation of all businesses in the area required for the construction of Nottingham Victoria railway station. Watson Fothergill decided to move to George Street, and his new office building was constructed in 1895.

The facade features a statue of a medieval architect, and busts of Augustus Pugin and George Edmund Street. Also inscribed on the building are the surnames of the architects George Gilbert Scott, William Burges and Richard Norman Shaw.

The office was for sale in 2011, but failed to reach the £240,000 reserve price.

On 19 July 2015 the building was damaged by a truck and was fully repaired by early 2018

== Gallery ==
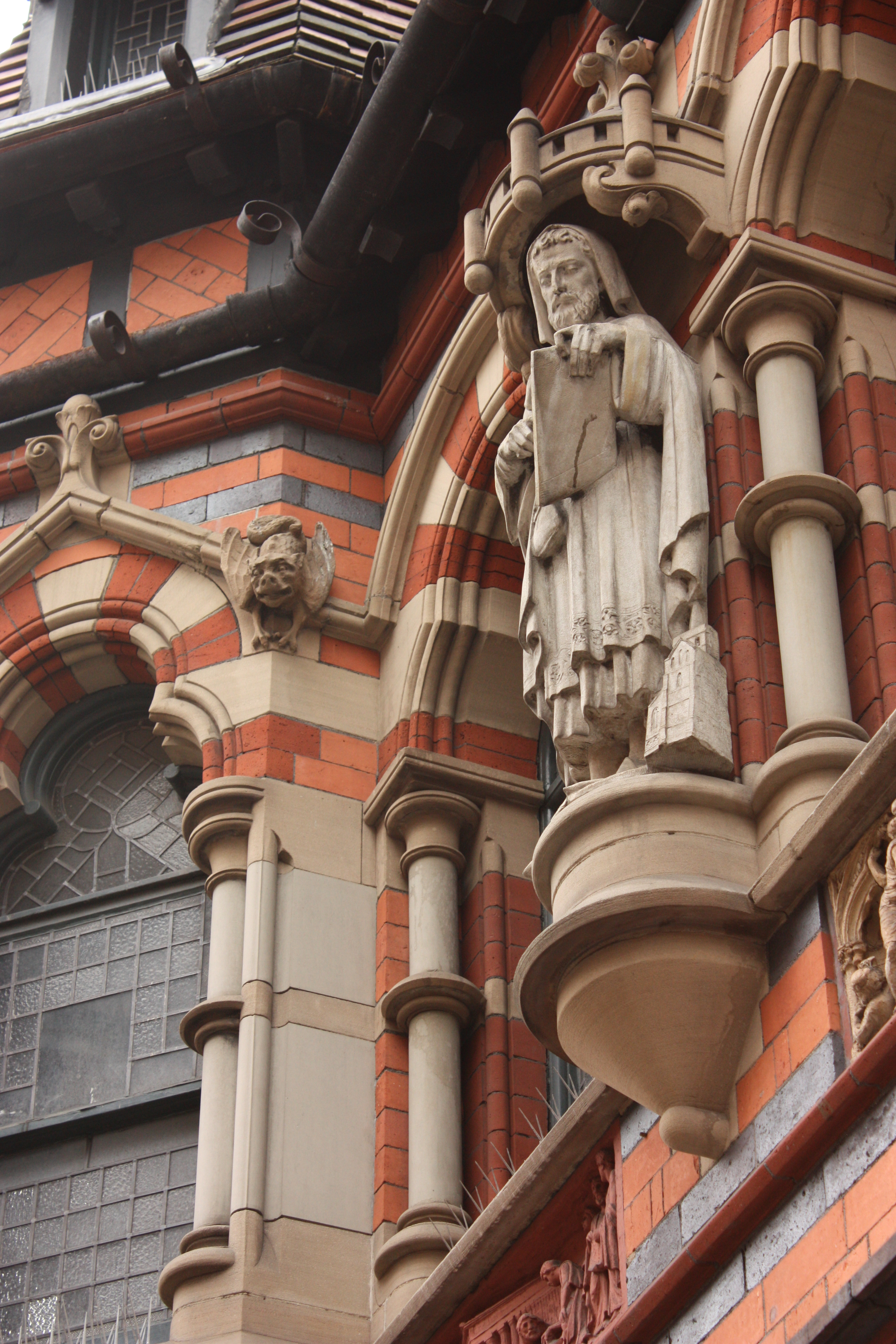
The medieval architect

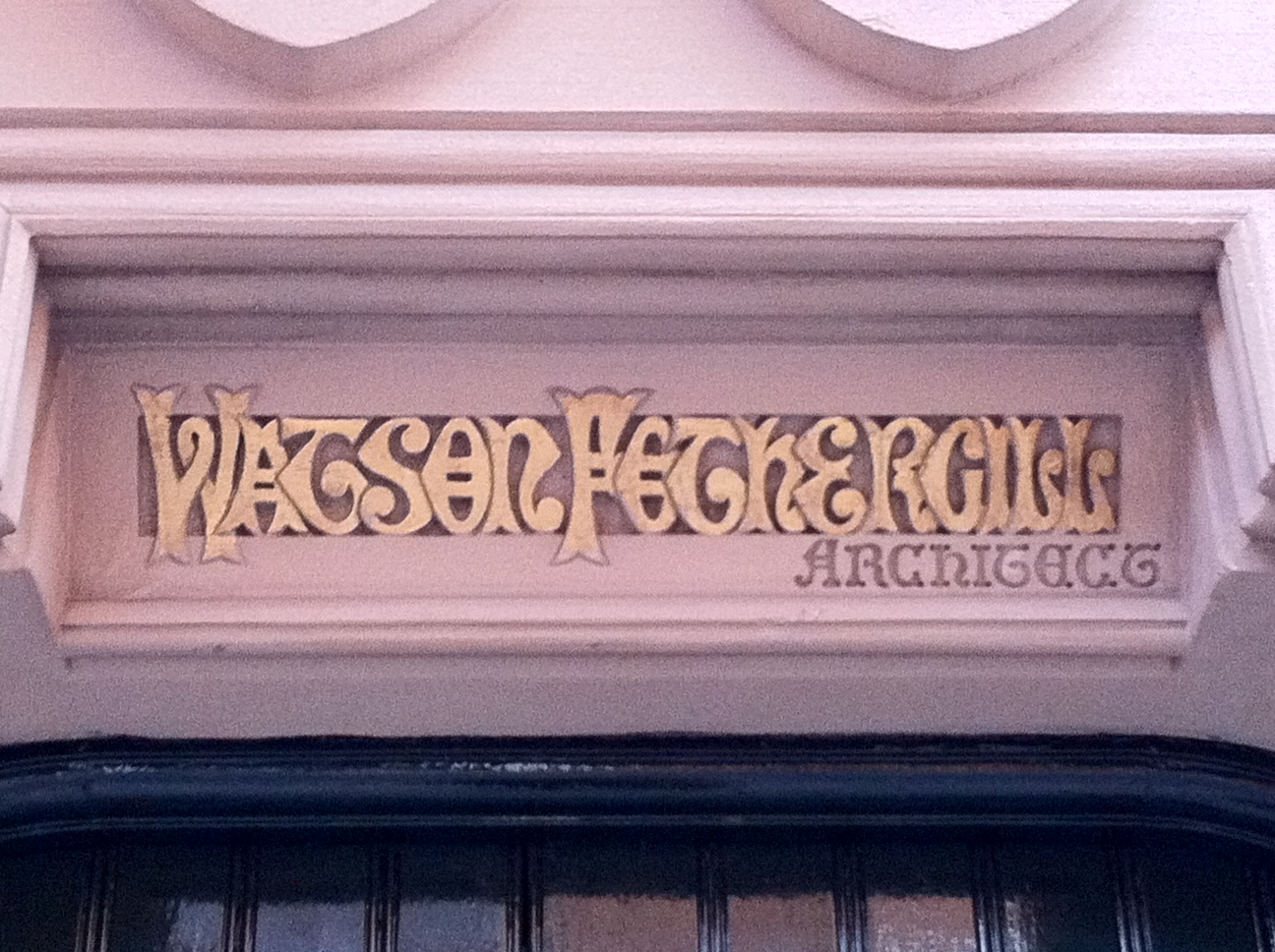
The title above the door

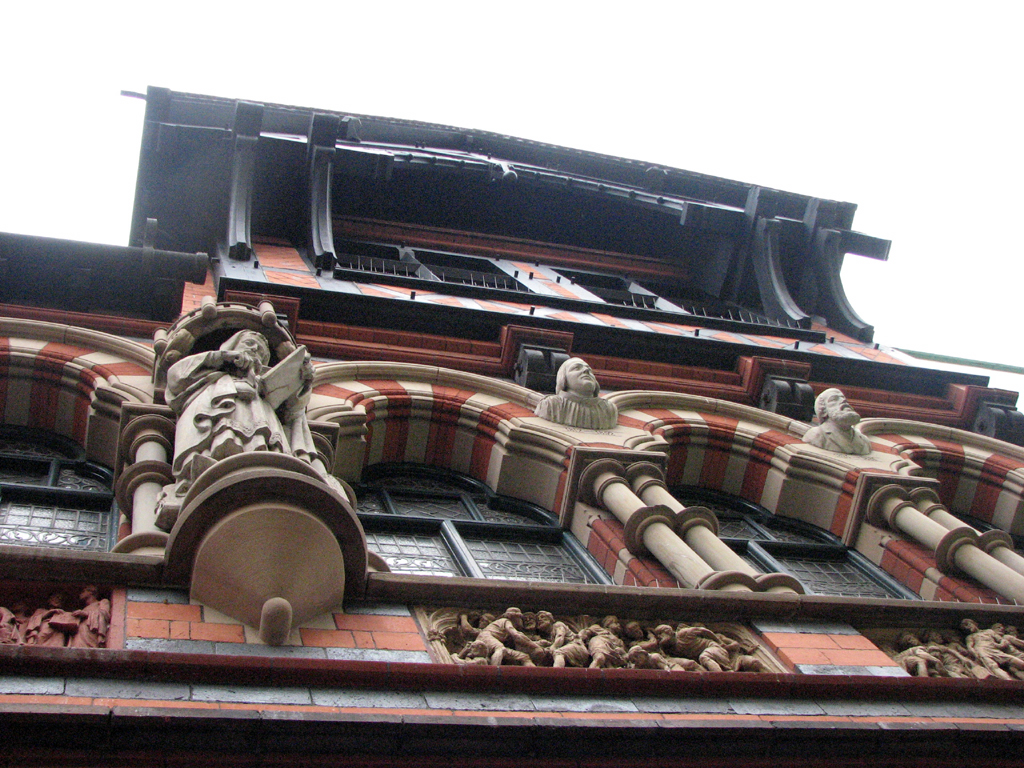
Friezes and statuary

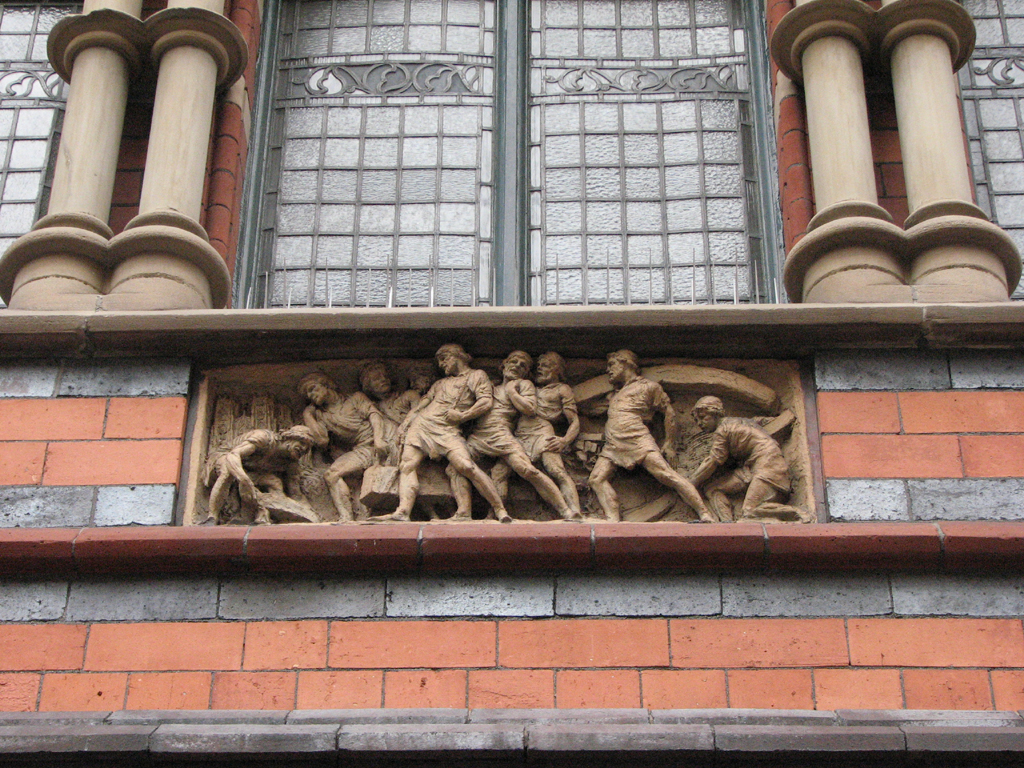
Frieze detail
