= Thomas Bostock Whinney =

- Born: 1860; London, UK
- Died: 7 May 1926 (aged 65–66)
- Education: Charterhouse School
- Occupation: Architect
- Spouse: Sydney Margaret Dickens
- Children: 3 (including Margaret Whinney)
- Relatives: Charles Dickens Jr. (father in law)

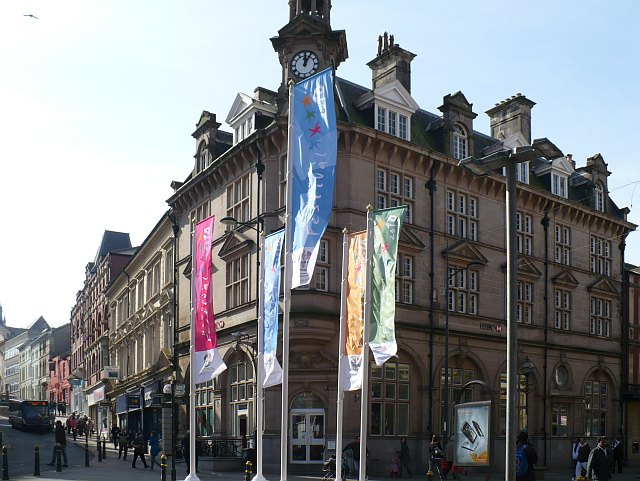
Midland Bank, Stow Hill/Tredegar Place, Newport 1896–97

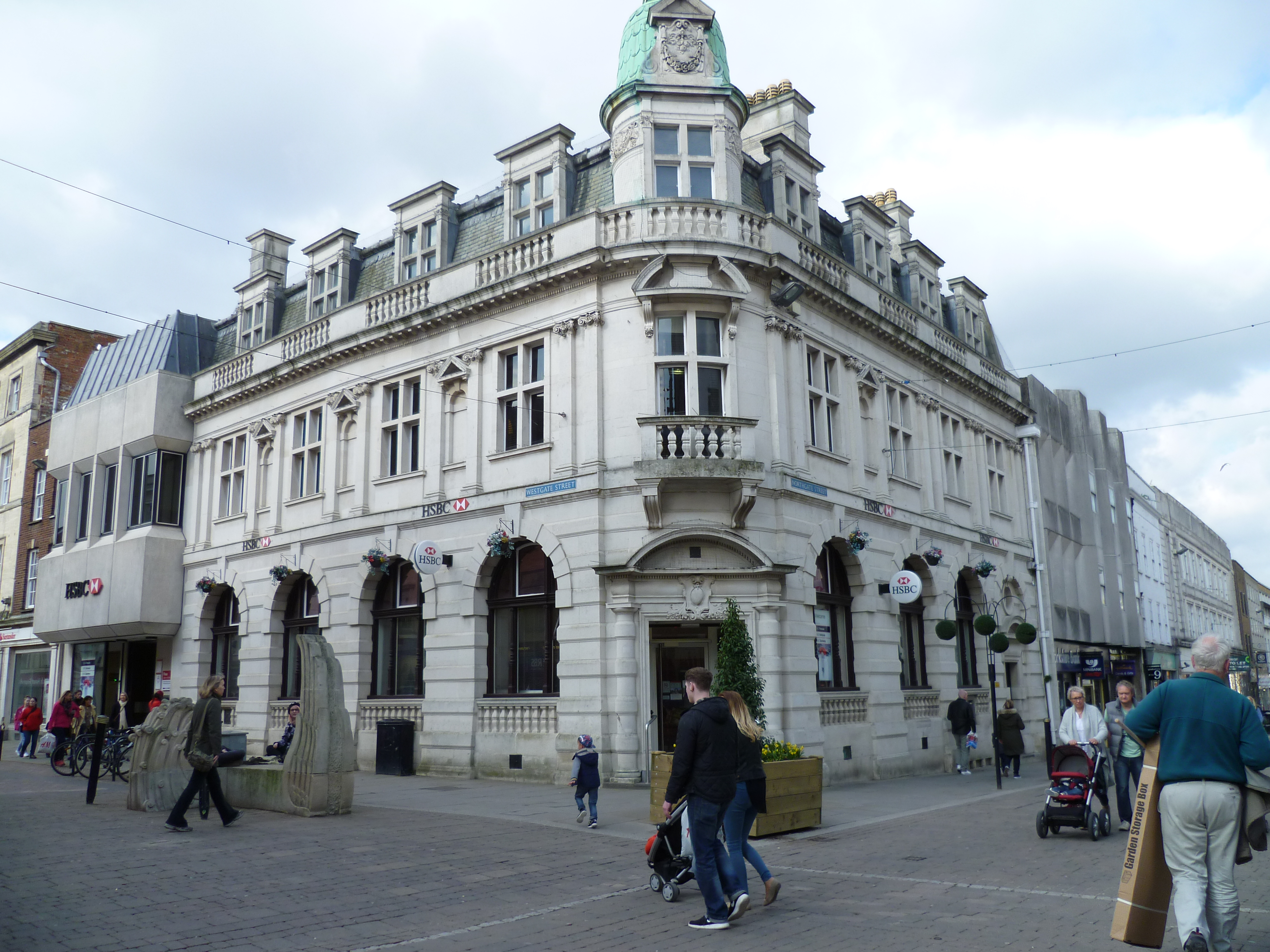
Midland Bank, The Cross, Gloucester 1905–07

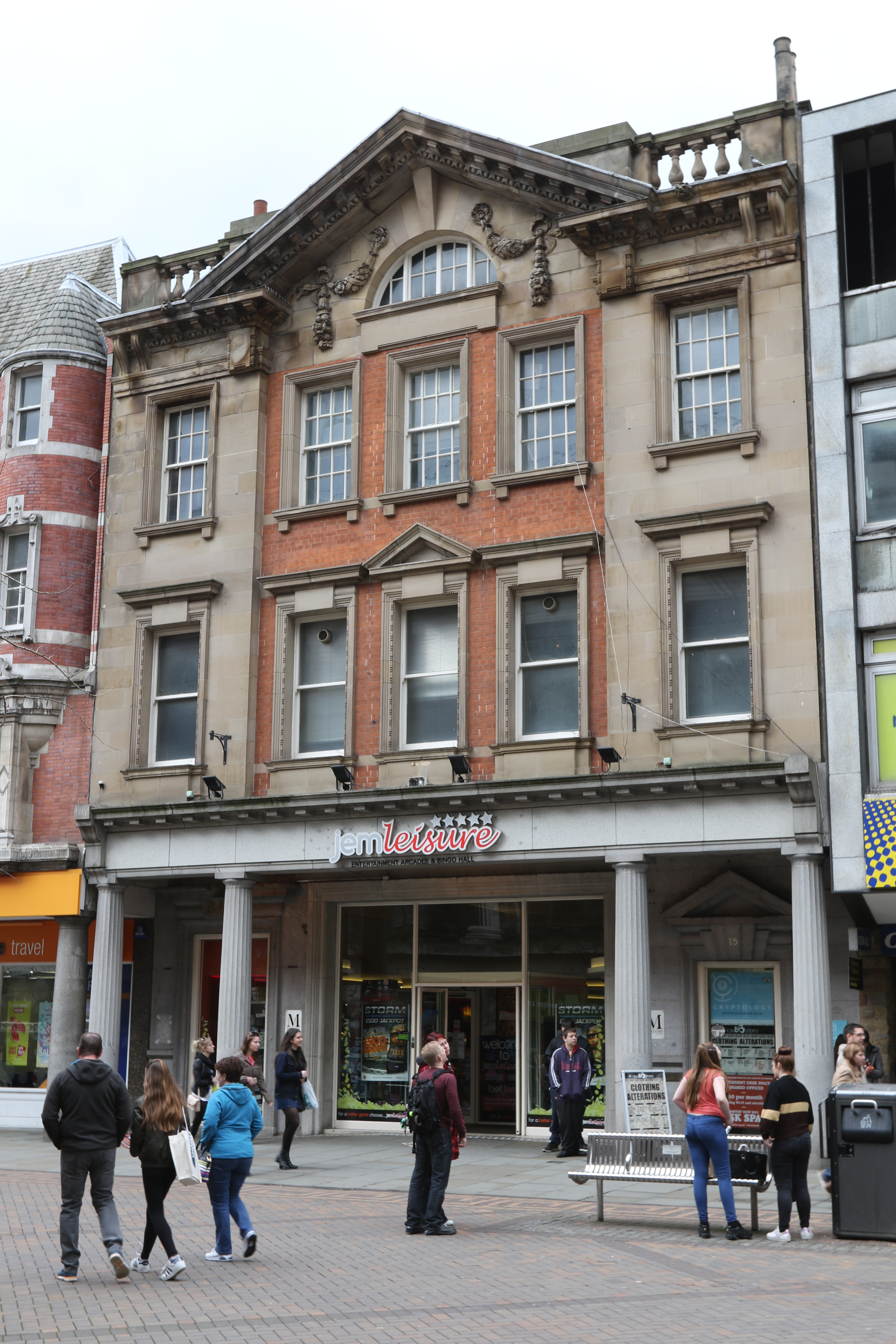
London City and Midland Bank, Long Row, Nottingham 1911

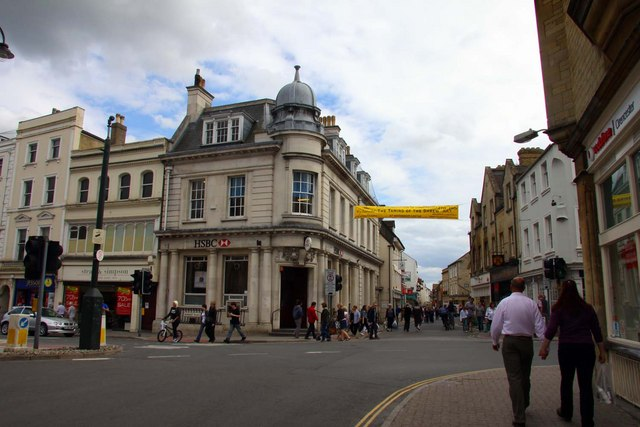
Midland Bank, Cirencester 1915–16

Thomas Bostock Whinney (1860 – 7 May 1926) FRIBA was an English architect based in London who became the chief architect of the Midland Bank.

== History ==
He was born in 1860, the son of Frederick Whinney of Regent's Park Road, London. He was educated at Charterhouse School.

He was appointed Fellow of the Royal Institute of British Architects, and had his offices at 8 Old Jewry, London. Later he was in partnership as Whinney, Son and Austen Hall.

He married Sydney Margaret Dickens, daughter of Charles Dickens Jr., on 30 July 1895 at St Andrew's Church, Fulham. Their children were:

- Margaret Dickens Whinney (1897–1974) who wrote books on British sculpture and architecture.
- Humphrey Charles Dickens Whinney (1899–1982)
- Philip Charles Dickens Whinney (1901–1959)

He died on 7 May 1926 and left an estate of £65,107 10s. 1d, (equivalent to £4,773,200 in 2023).

== Works ==
- Midland Bank, Stow Hill/Tredegar Place, Newport, South Wales 1896–97
- Midland Bank, High Street/Albion Place, Southampton 1900
- Midland Bank, North Street, Brighton 1902
- Midland Bank, London Street, Norwich 1902–03
- Midland Bank, Western Road, Brighton 1905
- London City and Midland Bank, The Cross, Gloucester 1905–07
- Midland Bank, Wallgate, Wigan 1910 alteration
- Midland Bank, Cornfield Road/Terminus Road, Eastbourne 1910–11
- London, City and Midland Bank, 15–16 Long Row, Nottingham 1911.
- Midland Bank, Bath Street/Longden Street, Sneinton, Nottingham 1911.
- Midland Bank, Linthorpe Road, Middlesbrough 1912
- London City and Midland Bank, High Street, Oakham
- Midland Bank, 2 Market Place, Cirencester 1915–16
- War memorial, London City and Midland Bank, Threadneedle Street, London 1921
- Midland Bank, Golders Green Road, Golders Green, London 1921
- Bank extension, 6 Victoria Street, Nottingham 1920–21 (two right hand bays)
- Midland Bank, 49 and 51, Corn Street, Bristol 1922
- Midland Bank, Henley on Thames, 1924
- Midland Bank, 73 High Street, Watford, 1907
