= Nottingham Journal =

Defunct British newspaper

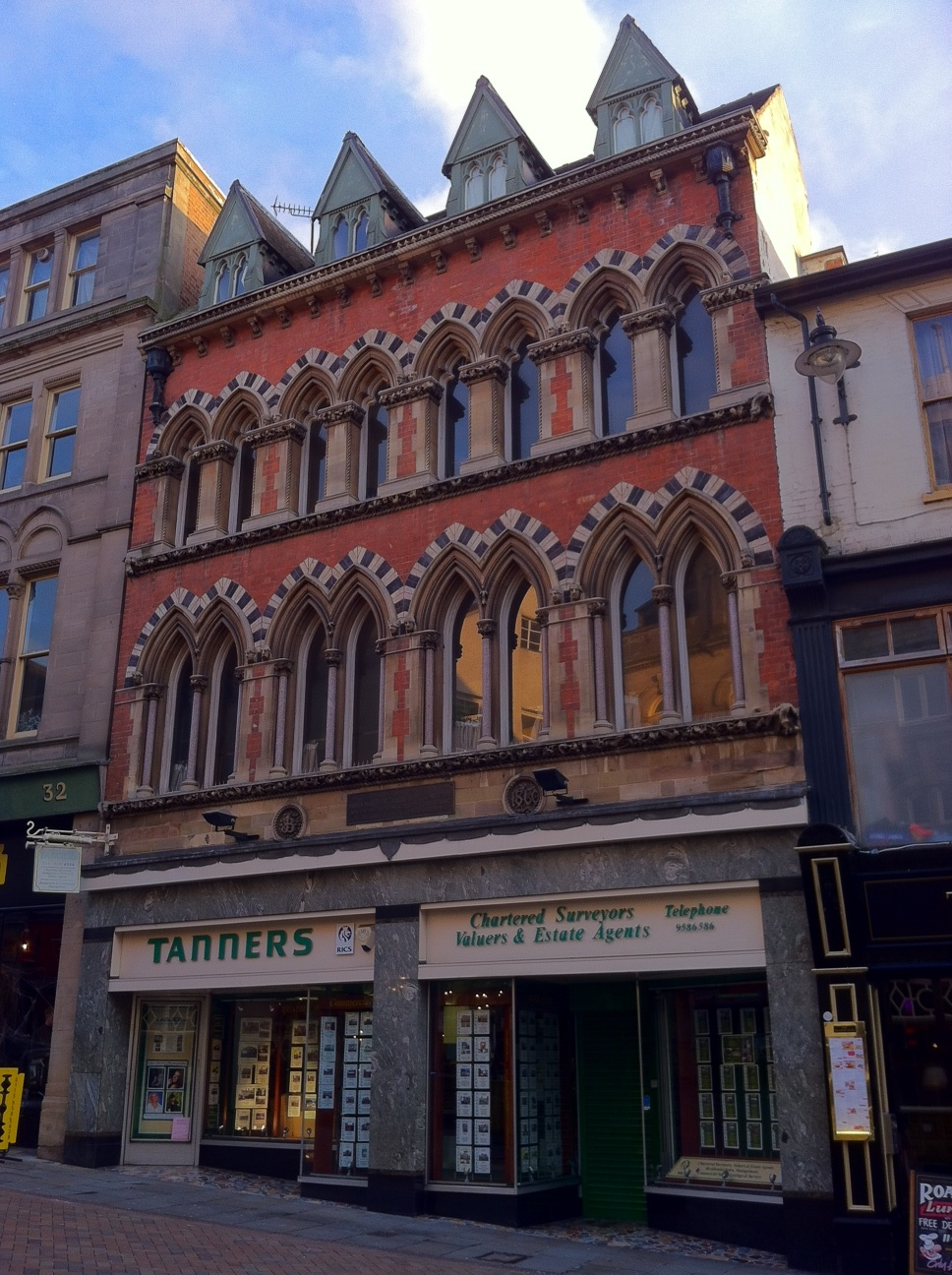
The former Nottingham Journal offices on Pelham Street, Nottingham

The Nottingham Journal was a newspaper published in Nottingham, Nottinghamshire, in the East Midlands in England. During that time, the paper went through several title changes through mergers, take-overs, acquisitions and ownership changes.

== History ==
Nottingham's first newspaper was probably The Weekly Courant, published by William Ayscough in August, 1712. It was followed by The Nottingham Post in 1716. In 1723 Ayscough took over the Post and later that year he published The Nottingham Weekly Courant. The Courant lasted until 1769, when Samuel Cresswell bought it and renamed it "Cresswell's Nottingham Journal". In 1775 he was joined by George Burbage, the name being changed to Cresswell and Burbage's Nottingham Journal. In 1787 the name was changed simply to The Nottingham Journal. Later Burbage became sole owner. On his death it was purchased by George Stretton. On Stretton's retirement in 1832 it was purchased by John Hicklin and Job Bradshaw. In 1841 it became Bradshaw's property.

In 1860 they occupied new premises on Pelham Street, Nottingham, built to designs by the architect Robert Clarke.

In 1887 it was incorporated in the Nottingham Daily Express which was renamed the Nottingham Journal in 1918.

In 1953 the Guardian Journal was formed by a merger of the Nottingham Guardian and Nottingham Journal. The Guardian Journal lasted until 1973.

== Famous people connected with the Nottingham Journal ==
The writer Graham Greene was a sub-editor on The Nottingham Journal before joining The Times; he then launched his career as a novelist.

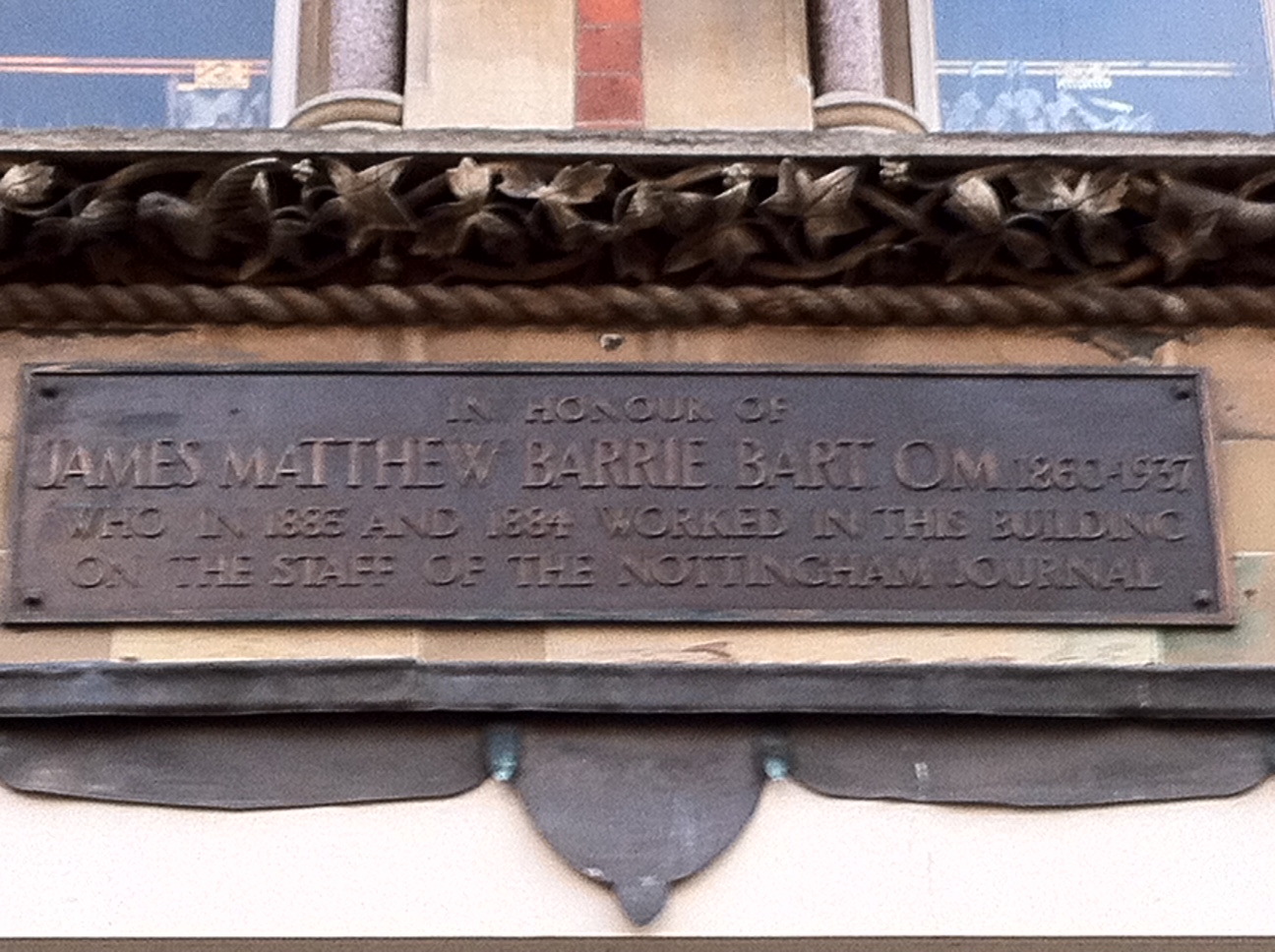
Plaque to mark the employment of J. M. Barrie at the Nottingham Journal offices

J. M. Barrie worked at the Nottingham Journal from 1883 to 1884 at three guineas a week, hand-writing daily leaders and Monday columns under the pseudonym Hippomenes, along with whimsical Thursday essays attributed to A Modern Peripatetic. A colleague described him as "a craftsman to his finger tips". The impressions he gained from this period took tangible form in his novel of provincial life, When a Man's Single, which first appeared as a serial in the British Weekly.

Cecil Roberts was editor from 1920 to 1925.

== Legacy ==
An annual literary journal called the New Nottingham Journal is due to launch in 2025. While not a direct successor to the newspaper, this project makes reference to several previous publications in the city.
