= Black Boy Inn =

Hotel and public house in Caernarfon, Gwynedd, Wales

Coordinates: 53.14142°N 4.27608°W

Black Boy Inn Logo

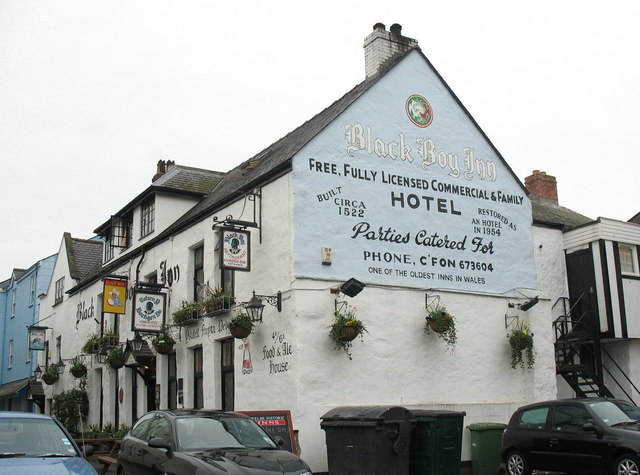
Black Boy Inn (2007)

The Black Boy Inn (or just Black Boy) is a hotel and public house in the Royal Town of Caernarfon in Gwynedd, Wales which is thought to date back to 1522, making it one of the oldest surviving inns in North Wales. It is within the medieval walls of Caernarfon, a few hundred yards from Caernarfon Castle.

== Name ==
Prior to 1828, the pub was known as the 'Black Boy'. Though still referred to by its traditional name, it was officially altered to the 'King's Arms' and, later, the 'Fleur de Lys', until a change of ownership led to the restoration of the old name and the creation of the "Black Boy Inn" as it is today. The Inn signs each show a 'black buoy' on one side and a 'black boy' on the other.

The Inn's name has caused controversy and there are at least three theories to explain its name. One is believed to come from a 'black buoy' which existed in the harbour in the early days of the Inn. Another refers to the nickname given to Charles II by his mother Henrietta Maria of France because of the darkness of his skin and eyes, as well as the fact that Royalists met at the Inn secretly at that time. Later, the place became the local fishermen's favourite drinking place and the name of ‘black boy’ may come from this period.

== History ==
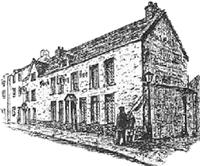
Sketch of the early Black Boy Inn

In Caernarfon's heyday as a port-town, Northgate Street – on which the Black Boy Inn is situated – was the heart of the red-light district. Northgate Street's Welsh name Stryd Pedwar a Chwech translates to "Four [shillings] and Six [pence] Street": what the sailors are reputed to have paid for a room, a bottle of gin, and the services of a woman for the night.

The 'North Gate' archway found at the end of Northgate Street was added in or about the 1820s. It was designed to help facilitate the flow of traffic in and out of the old town, and is not part of the original town wall design. Prior to the 'North Gate' archway, a census carried out in 1794 revealed this street was commonly referred to as 'Black Boy' street. The earliest reference to the "Black Boy" can be found in Caernarfon's archives dated 1717, a Deed of Sale of a house in "Street Y Black Boy" between Thomas Wynne, Glynllifon and a Henry Robyns.

The ghost of a nun is said to pass through the inn on her way to a nunnery that was once situated at the rear.

The pub has been listed as Grade II, being a rare surviving 17th-century building in Caernarfon that still retains some original interior details.

== Present day ==
The Black Boy Inn is one of the few remaining free houses owned by an independent family business in the United Kingdom.

In 1990 an archaeological excavation was carried out alongside the Black Boy Inn. Archaeologists discovered the skeleton of an old woman, believed to have been buried there to save the expense of a funeral.

During restoration work in 2009 workmen uncovered a range of relics underneath the dining room floorboards. The collection included a child's shoe, clay pipes, and a coin thought to date back to 1860. Upstairs rooms unveiled old beams which are thought to come from old sailing ships.

In 2008 and 2009, the Black Boy Inn was presented with the Cask Marque award for its cask ales. It is also included in CAMRA's 2010 edition of its annual Good Beer Guide, which features the best real ale venues in the United Kingdom.
