= Black Boy Hotel =

19th century Nottingham city centre hotel, now demolished

Black Boy Hotel, Nottingham
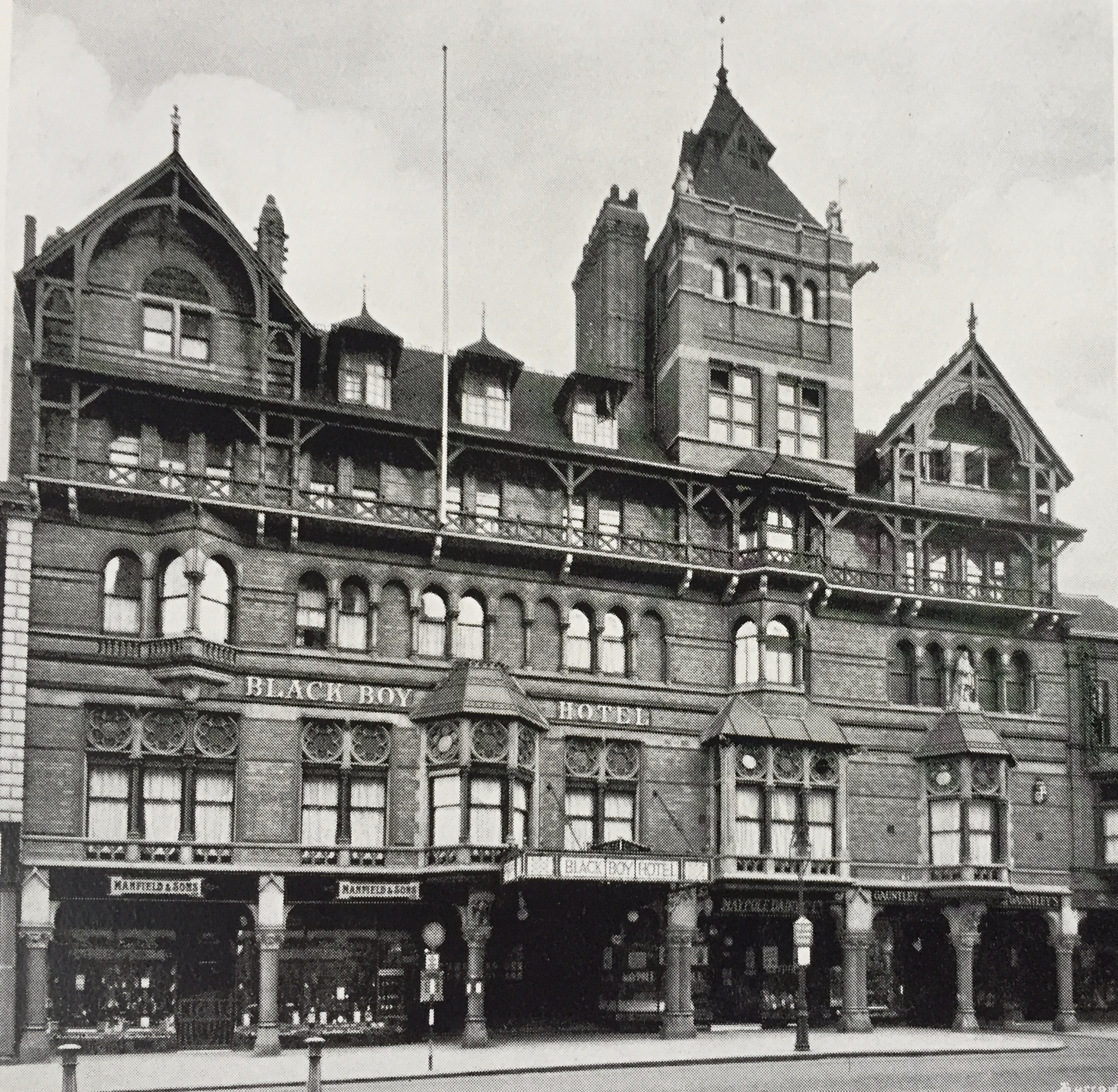
- Black Boy Hotel in 1939

- Location within Nottingham

General information
- Coordinates: 52.9537°N 1.1482°W
- Construction started: 1886
- Completed: 1900
- Demolished: 1970

Design and construction
- Architect: Watson Fothergill

The Black Boy Hotel was a coaching inn on Long Row in the centre of Nottingham until its demolition in 1970.

== History ==
The inn first came into existence in the 17th century, and by 1700 there were stage coaches departing regularly. It was part of the Mansfield Charities set up by Samuel Brunts, and provided income for this charity.

One of the earliest mentions of it is in the Record of the Borough of Nottingham for 1739–1740 where Richard Shipley was recorded as having 2 incroachments by pillars &c at the Black Boy.

It was rebuilt in 1886–88 by Watson Fothergill, and in 1897-1900 he made further additions and incorporated two shops. It was described in the Official Guide to Nottingham of 1939 as being:

established centuries ago as a posting house, by judicious planning and reconstruction it has been transformed into one of the most up-to-date hostelries in the Midlands. There are 90 bedrooms all fitted with hot and cold running water, and several bedrooms have communicating private bathroom and toilet accommodation. Self-contained suites are also available. The hotel is centrally heated and all floors are served by electric lifts. The Black Boy enjoys an unrivalled reputation for its catering and has excellent accommodation for banquets, balls and social functions of all kinds...There is a gentlemen's hairdressing saloon, on the premises.

The building survived until 1970 when it was demolished to make way for a new building which was occupied by Littlewoods, and more recently Primark. The statue of Samuel Brunts which adorned the front of the building was rescued and was given to the Brunts Academy in Mansfield. The lions which adorned the tower were also bought by the then Corporation of Nottingham and installed in Nottingham Castle's grounds where they remain.
