= Nottingham English School =

Coordinates: 52.9528°N 1.1435°W

Nottingham English School is a specialist provider of English language tuition based in the city of Nottingham in England. The School is an academic department forming part of Nottingham College, based at the historic Adams Building in the Lace Market area of Nottingham city centre.

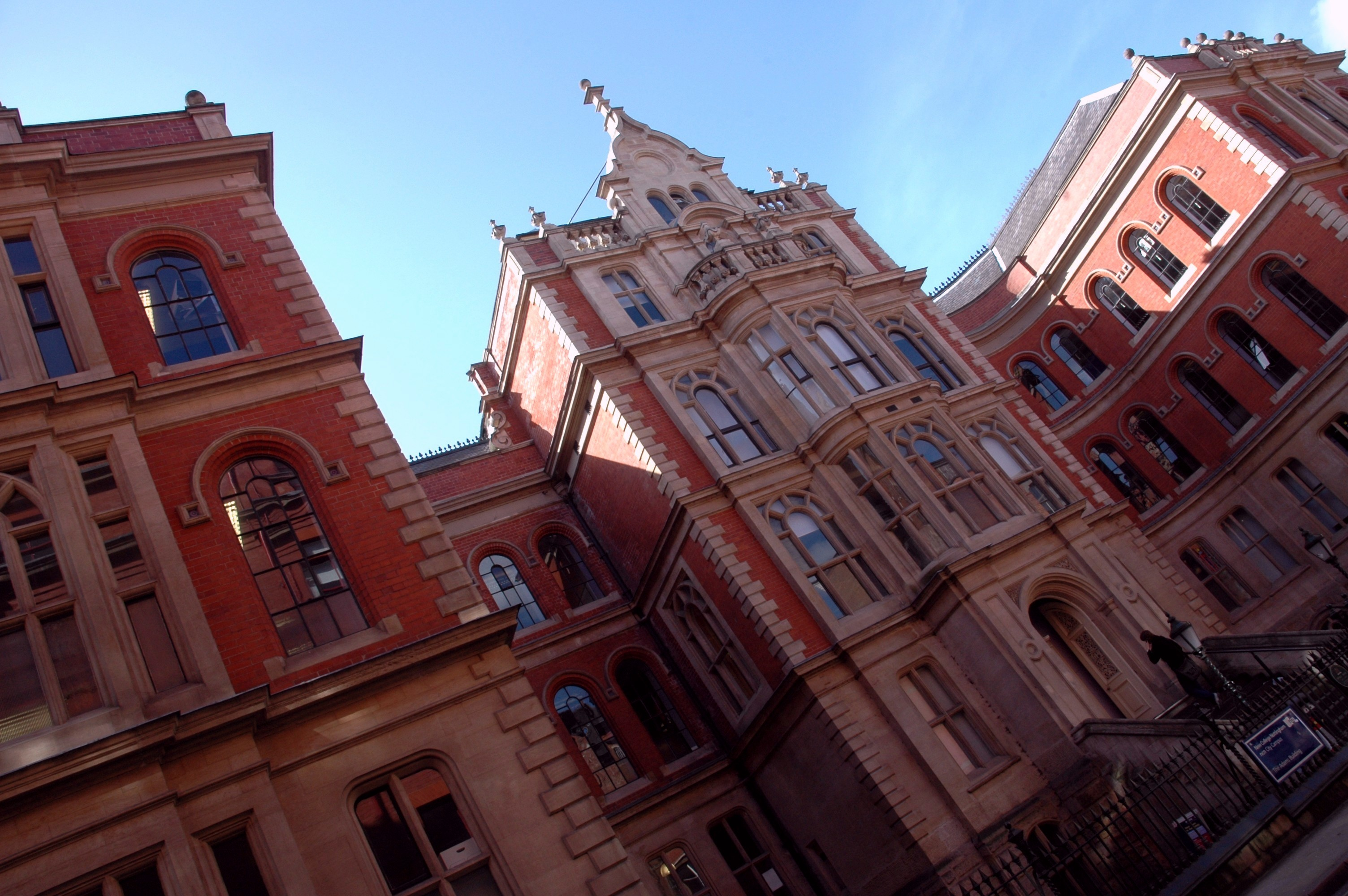
The Adams Building – principal facade on Stoney Street.

The Nottingham English School offers English language training including:

- General English
- Academic English
- Preparation for the IELTS test
- Summer School programmes
- CELTA teacher training programmes
- Bespoke study opportunities for groups

The Nottingham English School offers British Council-accredited English Language tuition and is a member of English UK. Nottingham College is licensed to sponsor migrants by the UK Visas and Immigration under Tier 4 of the British points-based immigration system.
