= CPMG Architects =

Architectural practice in Nottingham, England

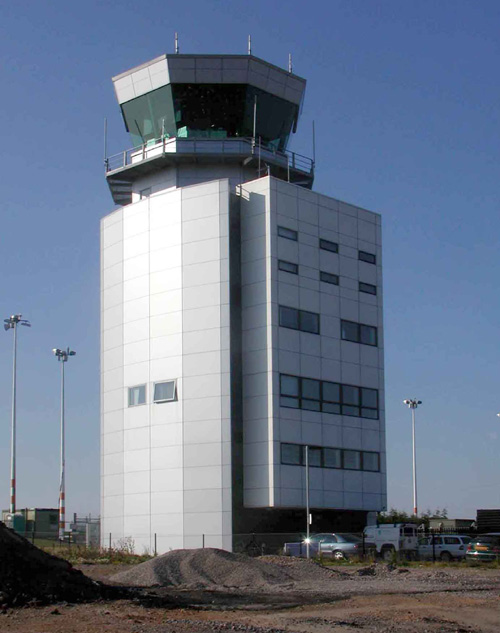
Control Tower, Bristol International Airport 2004

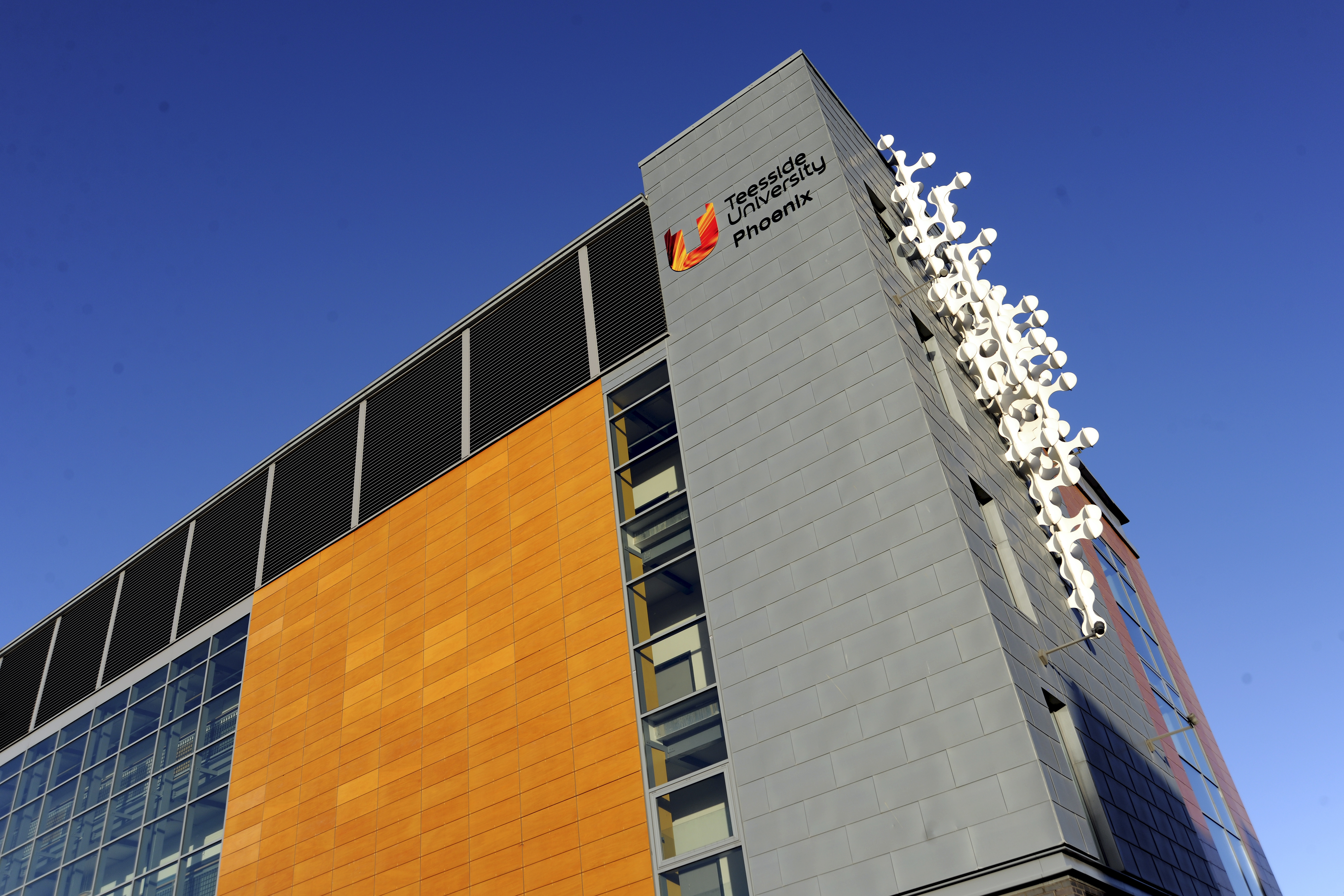
Teesside University's Phoenix Building 2006

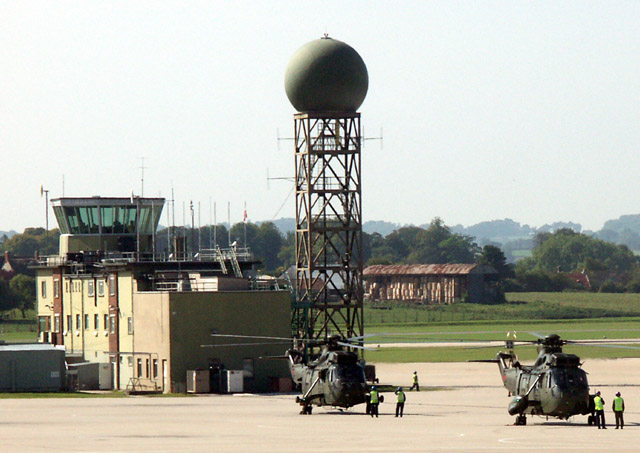
Control tower, RNAS Yeovilton 2007

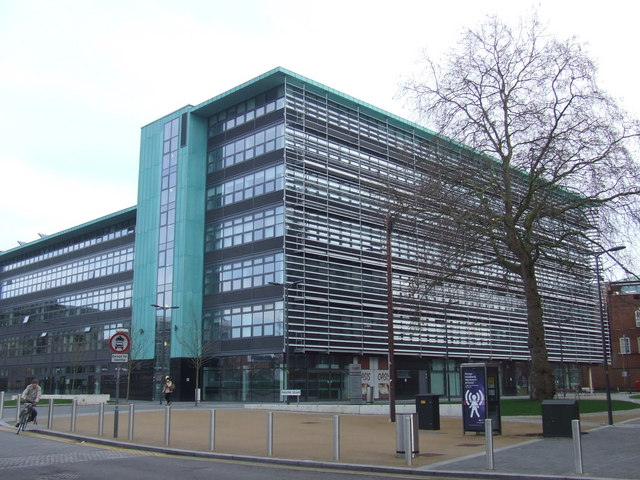
Hugh Aston Building, De Montfort University 2009

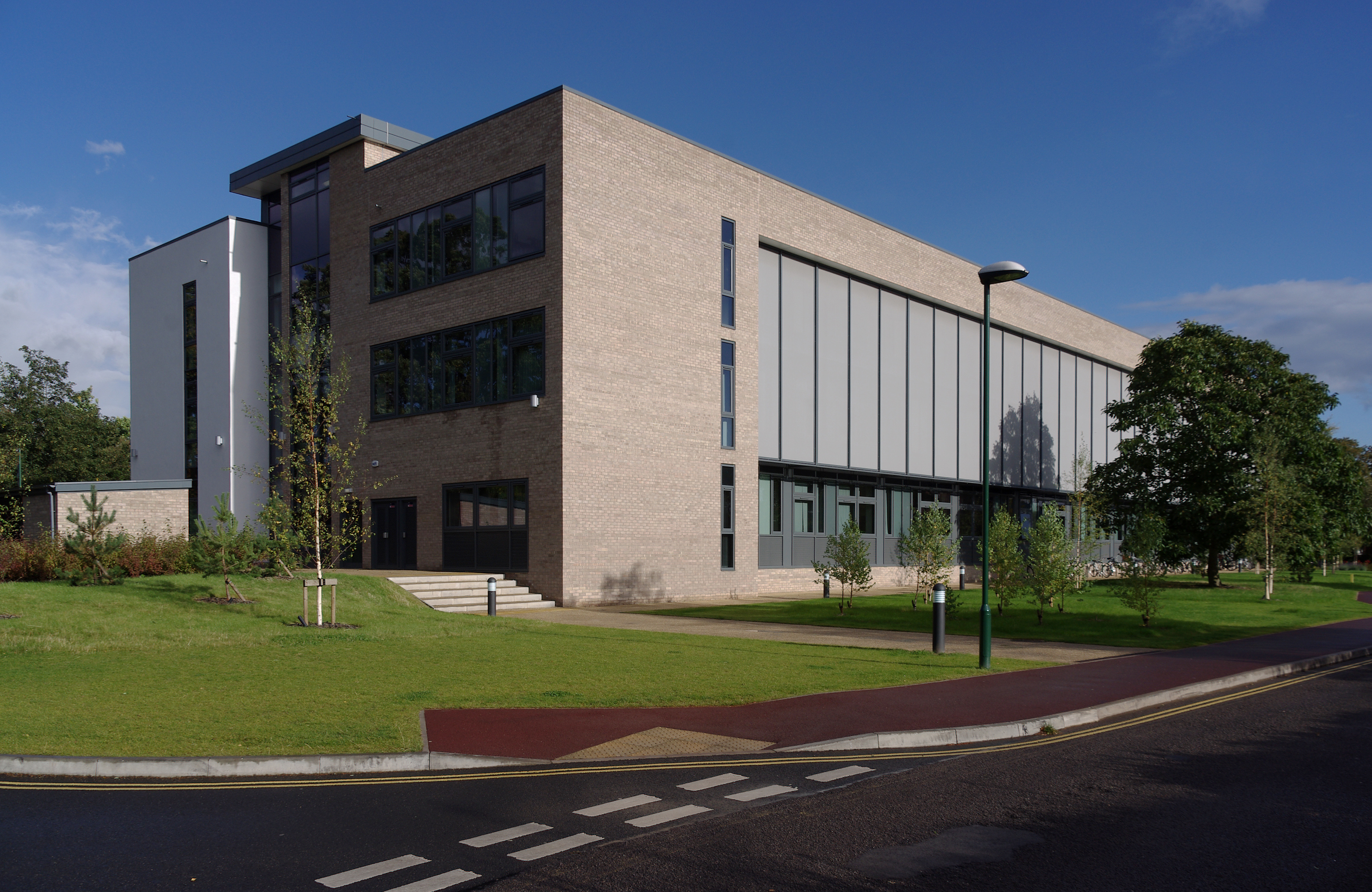
School of Humanities, University of Nottingham 2011

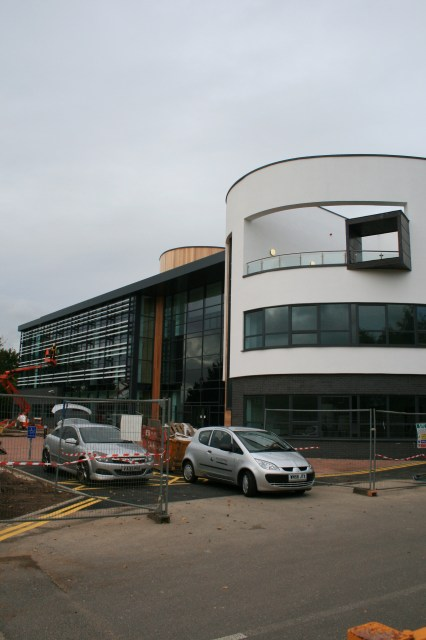
Castle College, Chilwell

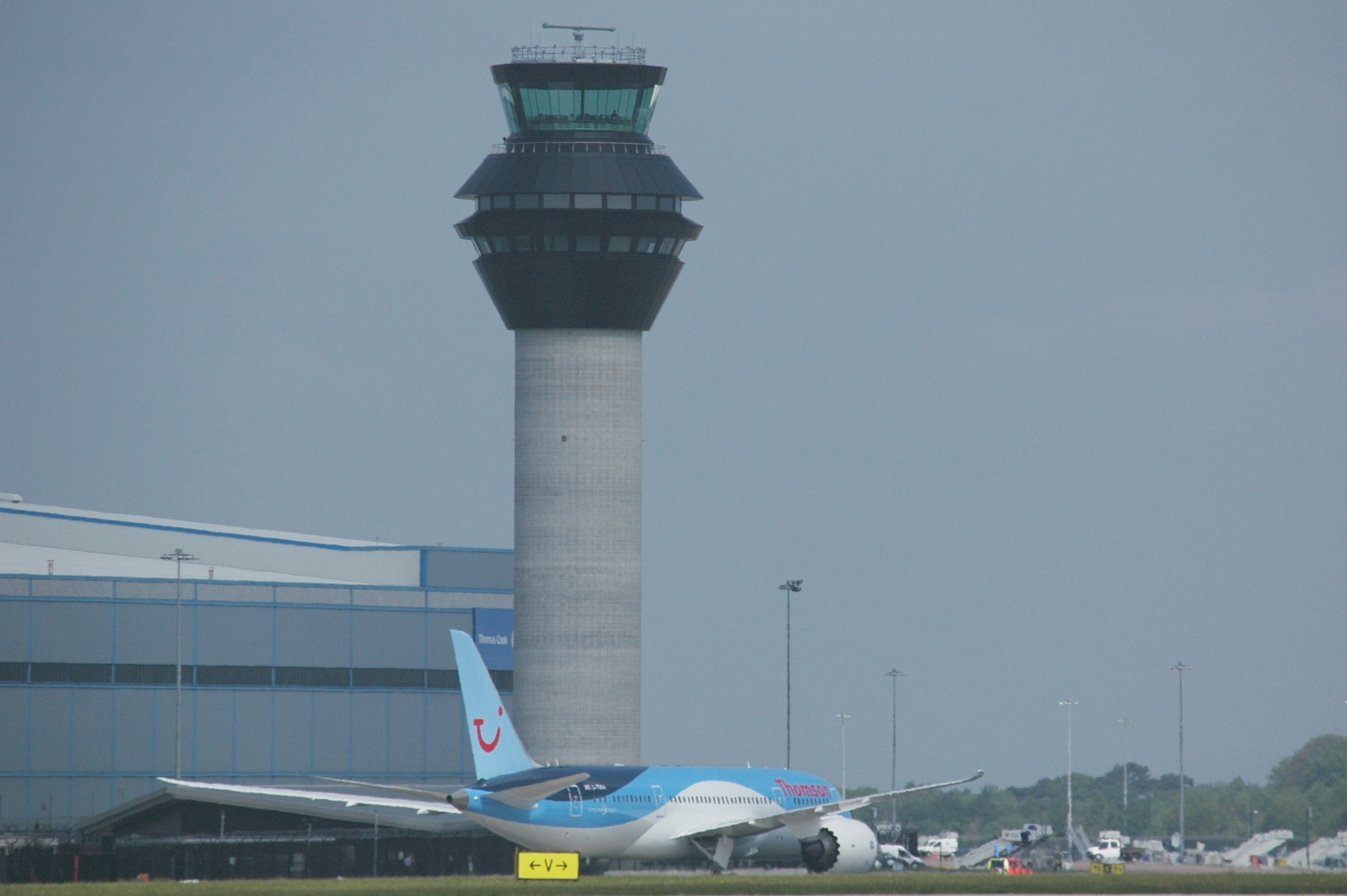
Manchester Airport Control Tower

CPMG Architects is an architectural practice in Nottingham.

== History ==
The practice was established in 1997 from the merger of two local companies, Crampin Pring, and James McArtney. With Jack Gant, the initials of the four architects were used to create the CPMG name.

In 2011 Jack Gant and Bill Crampin retired, and four directors undertook a management buyout of the practice. It opened a branch office in London in 2015. The Birmingham office was opened in 2021

== Works ==
- Adams Building, Nottingham 1996-99 restoration for New College Nottingham
- Rugby Art Gallery and Museum 2000
- Octagon, Derby Road, Nottingham 2000-01 (conversion to apartments)
- Elective Orthopaedic Theatres, Nottingham City Hospital 2001
- Coopers Square, Burton on Trent 2001
- Network Rail HQ, York 2002
- Hicks Building, University of Sheffield 2002 (remodelling block of 1955-64)
- Boots Building, High Street, Nottingham 2002 (refitting for Zara)
- Bristol Airport Air Traffic Control Centre 2004
- Moat House Primary School, Coventry 2004
- Rolls-Royce Compressions, Sinfin, Derby 2004
- Nottingham Squash Club 2004
- Radiology Unit, Leicester General Hospital 2005
- Student Health Centre, University of Sheffield 2005
- Pharmacy Quality Control Unit, Queen's Medical Centre 2006
- Moseley Primary School, Coventry 2006
- WEBS Training Academy, Beeston, Nottingham 2006
- Phoenix Building, Teesside University 2006
- Huntingdon Library and Archive 2006
- Carnegie Museum, Melton Mowbray 2006
- Carrington Point, Nottingham 2006
- Bilborough College 2006-07
- Binding House, Hucknall Road/Caxton Road, Nottingham 2007
- Verde apartments, Glasgow Green 2007
- Park Inn Hotel, West George Street/Renfield Street, Glasgow 2007 (formerly the offices of Pearl Assurance)
- Aston Customer Service Centre, Rotherham 2007
- Cambridgeshire County Council Offices, Huntingdon 2007
- Athena Building, Teesside University 2007
- Isle of Man Airport Air Traffic Control Centre 2007
- RNAS Yeovilton Air Traffic Control Centre 2007
- Litmus Building, Huntingdon Street, Nottingham 2008
- Huntingdon Criminal Justice Centre 2008
- East Midlands Air Traffic Control Centre and Departure Lounge 2009
- Darlington Campus, Teesside University 2009
- Riverbank Building, Stafford College 2009
- Papworth Hospital, Cambridge 2009
- The Ear Foundation Projects, Nottingham 2009
- Laing O’Rourke ExpLORe Building, Steetley 2009
- GlaxoSmithKline, Coleford 2009
- 12 Smithfield Street, London 2009
- Hugh Aston Building, De Montfort University, Leicester 2009
- Rolls-Royce Nelson, Barnoldswick 2010
- Wolverton Depot, Milton Keynes 2010
- Bannerbrook Park, Coventry 2010
- Prolog 5, Sherwood Park 2011
- Dunelm HQ, Leicester 2011
- School of Humanities, University of Nottingham, 2011
- Opus Energy HQ, Northampton 2013
- Park View House Offices, Nottingham 2014
- Kemball School, Stoke-on-Trent 2015
- Air Traffic Control Centre, Manchester Airport 2015
- Visitor Centre, HMS Belfast, London 2015
- Cavendish Road, Nottingham 2015
- XP School, Doncaster 2015-16
- Student Union hub, Portland Building, University of Nottingham 2015-16.
- Castle College, Chilwell
- The Gym and Green Wall, Teesside University 2015-16
- Quest Academy, Croydon, London 2015-16
- Rykneld Primary School, Staffordshire 2015-16
- Heathfield Primary School, Kersall Drive, Nottingham 2015-16
- Forster Academy, Bradford 2015-16
- The Venue, De Montfort University 2015-16
- Intercontinental London O2 Hotel, 2016
- Little Ilford School PSBP Barking, Dagenham and Newham 2016
- Bombardier VShop, Derby 2016
- Waterside Campus, University of Northampton 2016-17
- Aerospace Integrated Research Centre, Cranfield University 2016-17
- Vijay Patel Building, De Montfort University, Leicester 2016
- Student Accommodation, Broadgate, Beeston, Nottingham 2016
- Central Fire Station, London Road, Nottingham 2016
- New Building, BioCity Nottingham 2016-17
- Library, Teesside University 2017
- Chandos Pole, University of Derby 2017
- KP house, Express Buildings, Nottingham 2017
- Slimming World HQ, Alfreton, Nottinghamshire 2017-18
- Theatre building, Ecclesbourne School, Derbyshire
- Walnut Tree Park, Guildford
- John Pye Luxury Assets, Old Bond Street, London
- Centre Parcs, Elvedon Forest
- Cripps Health Centre, Nottingham University
