= Soldiers and Sailors Sports Ground, Breaston =

Coordinates: 52.9113°N 1.3208°W

- Breaston parish highlighted within Derbyshire
- OS grid reference: SK 4577335097
- Civil parish: Breaston
- District: Erewash
- Shire county: Derbyshire
- Region: East Midlands
- Country: England
- Sovereign state: United Kingdom
- Police: Derbyshire
- Fire: Derbyshire
- Ambulance: East Midlands

The Soldiers & Sailors Sports Ground is a sports facility, located on the outskirts of the Civil Parish of Breaston, on Risley Lane, near the A52.

== Facilities ==
The site has two full sized football pitches and one cricket pitch, that is rated by the DCCL as a Grade B ground. There's a pavilion on the north side of the ground with a kitchen, and changing room facilities. There is also a car park with 6 spaces. The site has disabled access.

== Affiliations ==
Many sports clubs have used the ground over the years. Listed below are some that use the ground:

=== Cricket ===
Sandiacre Town Cricket Club. Since 2017, Sandiacre's 3rd XI use this ground to host Derbyshire County Cricket League matches, and their Junior League teams use the ground to host Erewash Young Cricketers League matches.

Breaston Cricket Club: Since the early 1960s, Breaston's 1st XI and Sunday Friendly XI teams have been using the ground as their home ground. The club hosted all their South Nottinghamshire Cricket League home matches on the ground between 2005 and 2015.

=== Football ===
Breaston Park Football Club: Junior teams.
