= Tommy Rose =

English footballer

Personal information
- Full name: Thomas Rose
- Date of birth: 1872
- Place of birth: Breaston, England
- Date of death: after 1895
- Position: Centre forward

Senior career*
Years	Team	Apps	(Gls)
1891–1892	Langley Mill Rangers		
1892–1894	Heanor Town		
1894–1896	Nottingham Forest	30	(9)
1896	Bulwell United		
Total		30	(9)
- * Club domestic league appearances and goals

Thomas Rose (1872 – after 1895) was an English footballer who played in the Football League for Nottingham Forest.
