= St Mary's Gate, Nottingham =

Street in Nottingham, England

St Mary's Gate
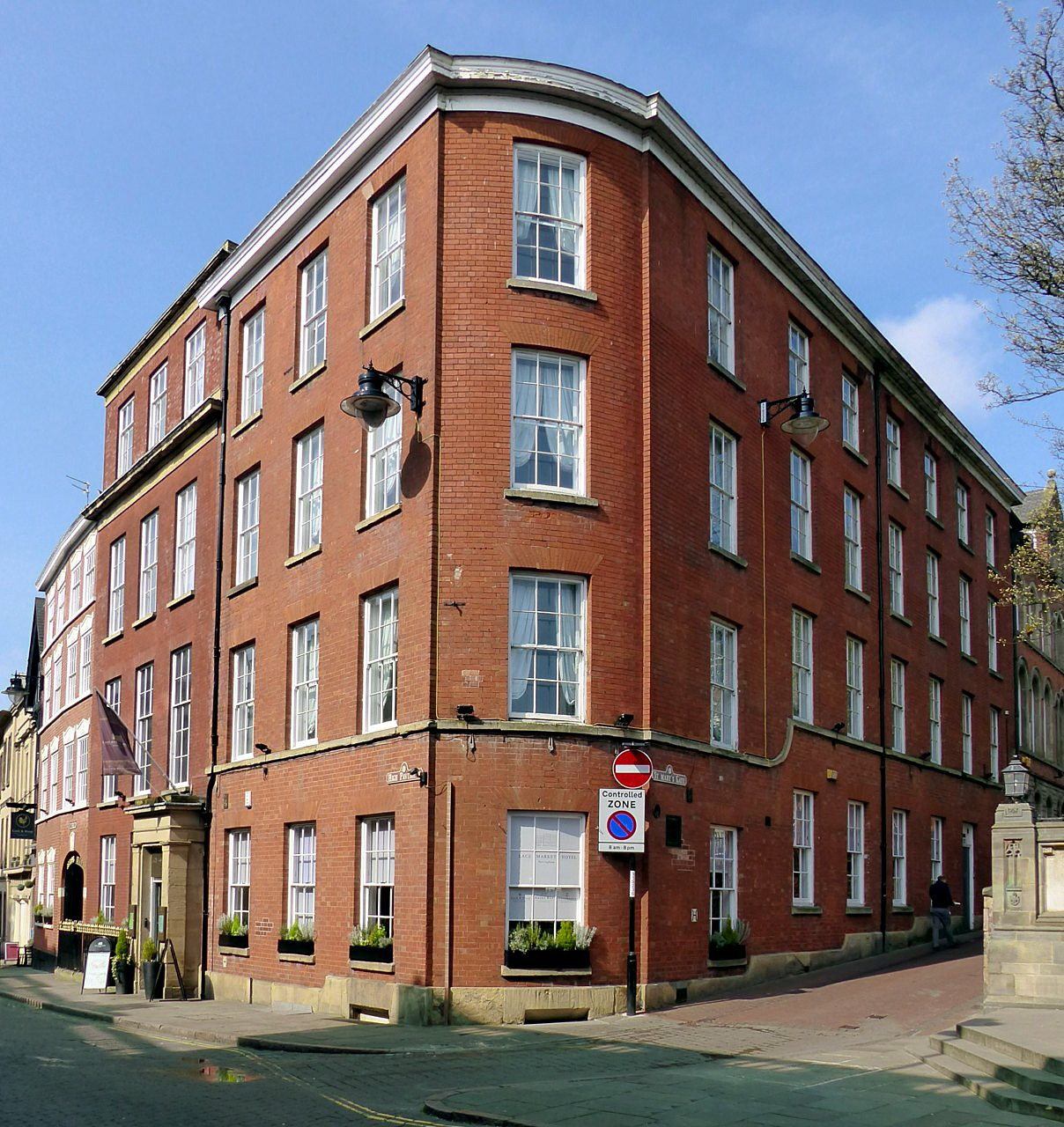
- The entrance to St Mary’s Gate

- Location within Nottingham
- Maintained by: Nottingham City Council
- Coordinates: 52°57′6.4″N 1°8′39.41″W

St Mary’s Gate is a historic street in the Lace Market area of Nottingham City Centre between High Pavement and Warser Gate.

== History ==
The early name for the street was Seynt Maregate (Latin: Via Beatae Mariae), taking its name from St Mary's Church which is at the southern end. In the late Middle Ages the street housed workshops for the production of Nottingham alabaster.

The street housed the old Theatre Royal which was built in 1760 on the site of an older establishment. It was held on lease for many years by Robertson and Manly, managers of a company of comedians who visited Nottingham three or four times per year. The theatre was sold in 1854 to J.F. Saville for £1,950 (equivalent to £186,900 in 2025). The theatre was converted by Richard Middleton into Middleton’s Royal Alhambra Music Hall in 1865, when the new Theatre Royal was opened in Parliament Street. In 1880 the owner of the Royal Alhambra Music Hall, John Betts Wigley was charged with assaulting and beating a comedian William White. The Music Hall closed in 1883 when the Nottingham Magistrates’ refused a theatrical licence.

== Notable buildings ==
- 1-17 Adams Building 1854-75 by Thomas Chambers Hine
- 5-47, Halifax Place flats, 1981-83 by Peter Hill
- 27 House, late 18th century. It was built in 1849 for Louis Augustin Baillon, the Vice Consul of France, as Consulate Offices. In 1860s it was adapted into a Lace warehouse.
- 35 and 37 Warehouse 1880
- 46 Kean's Head Public House. Formerly warehouse and offices 1907 by Robert Evans JP, Robert Evans (Jun), and J Wollatt.
- 48 to 50 Lace Warehouse, 1883 by S & J Cargill. now offices
- 49 House, now offices
