= St Michael's Church, Breaston =

Coordinates: 52°53′49.15″N 1°19′1.58″W

St Michael’s Church, Breaston
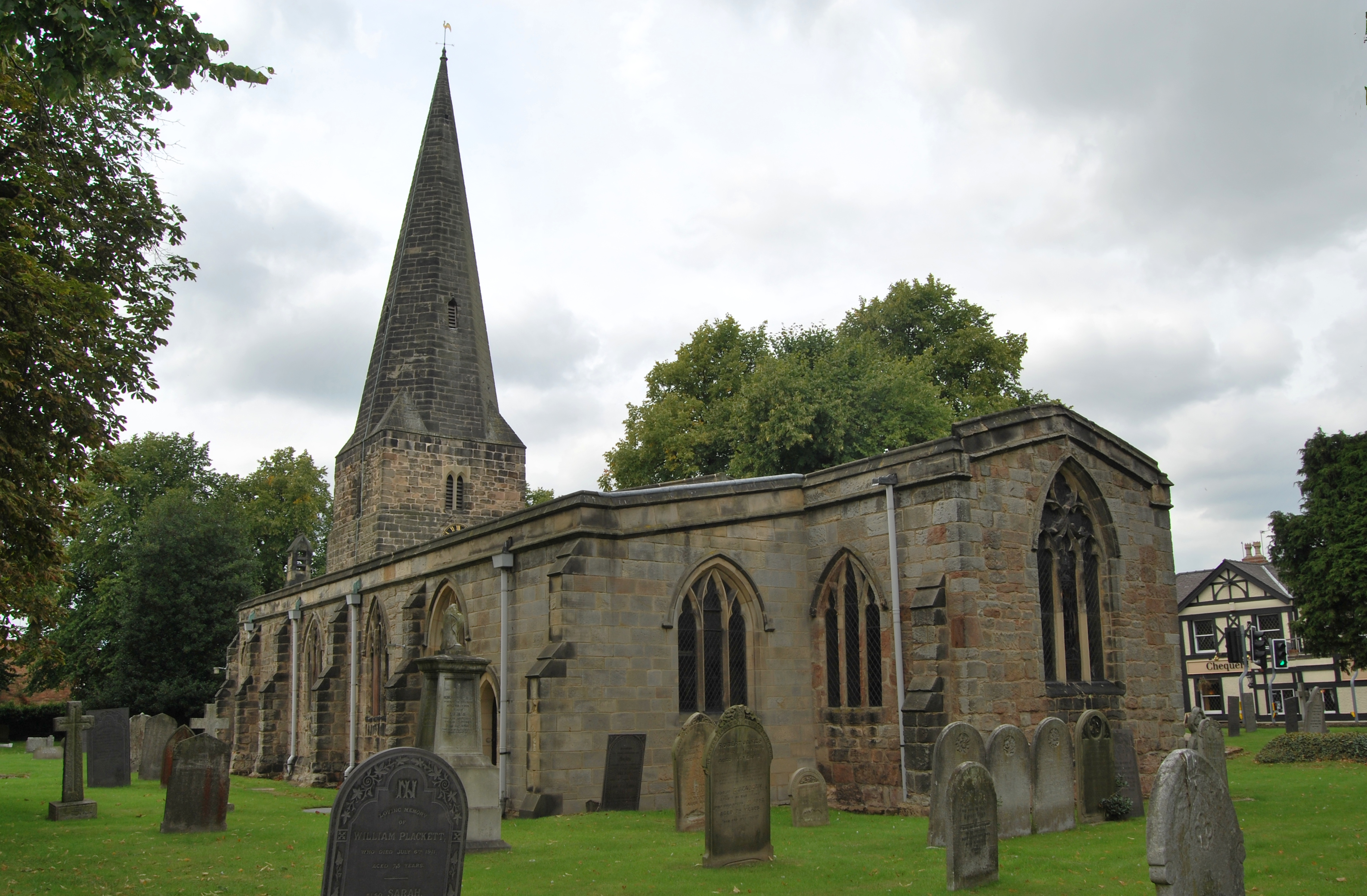
- St Michael’s Church, Breaston (photograph by Russ Hamer)
- St Michael’s Church, Breaston
- Location: Breaston
- Country: England
- Denomination: Church of England

History
- Dedication: St Michael

Architecture
- Heritage designation: Grade I listed

Administration
- Diocese: Diocese of Derby
- Archdeaconry: Derby
- Deanery: Erewash
- Parish: Breaston

St Michael's Church, Breaston is a Grade I listed parish church in the Church of England in Breaston, Derbyshire.

== History ==
The church dates from the 11th century, but is mostly 14th and 15th century. The roofs were raised in the 16th century. A restoration took place in 1871 by Robert Evans of Nottingham where the old box pews were replaced with new seating, and choir stalls were provided. The west gallery was removed. The floor was laid with boards under the seating, red quarry tiles in the aisles, and May and Co encaustic tiles laid in the chancel. The south aisle roof was re-leaded. The Rector provided a small stained glass window featuring St Michael, which was designed and installed by Heaton, Butler and Bayne. It was restored between 1895 and 1899 by Robert Evans and Son who also added a new vestry. The contractor was C Baines of Newark.

== Parish status ==
The church is in a joint parish with

- St Chad's Church, Church Wilne
- St Mary's Church, Draycott

== Organ ==
The pipe organ was built by Nigel Church and dates from 1975. A specification of the organ can be found on the National Pipe Organ Register.

== See also ==
- Grade I listed churches in Derbyshire
- Listed buildings in Breaston
