= Robert Evans (architect, 1832–1911) =

English architect

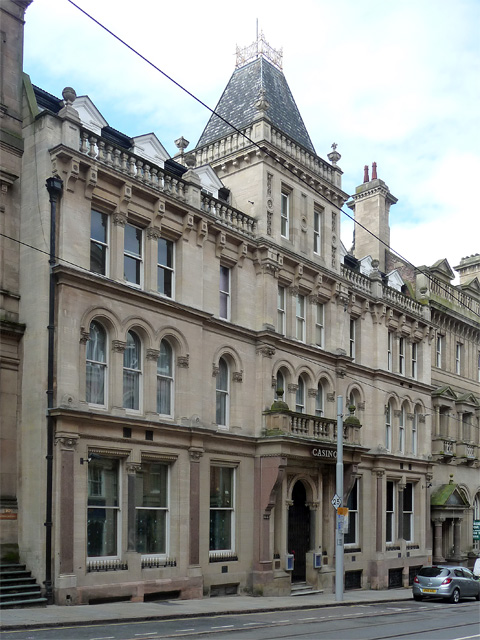
Imperial Fire and Life Insurance Office, 16–18 Victoria Street 1872

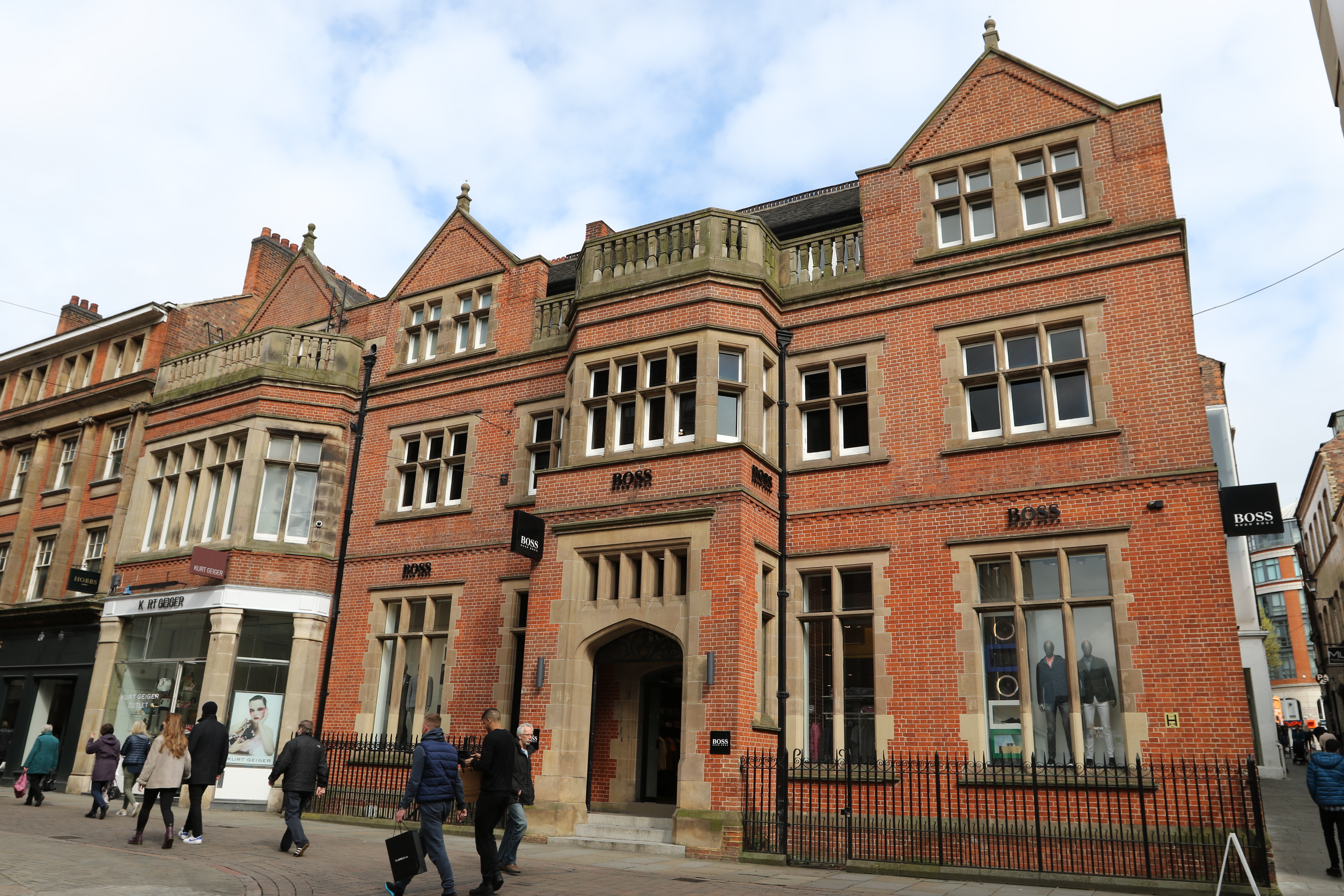
Hart, Fellow's and Company 1884

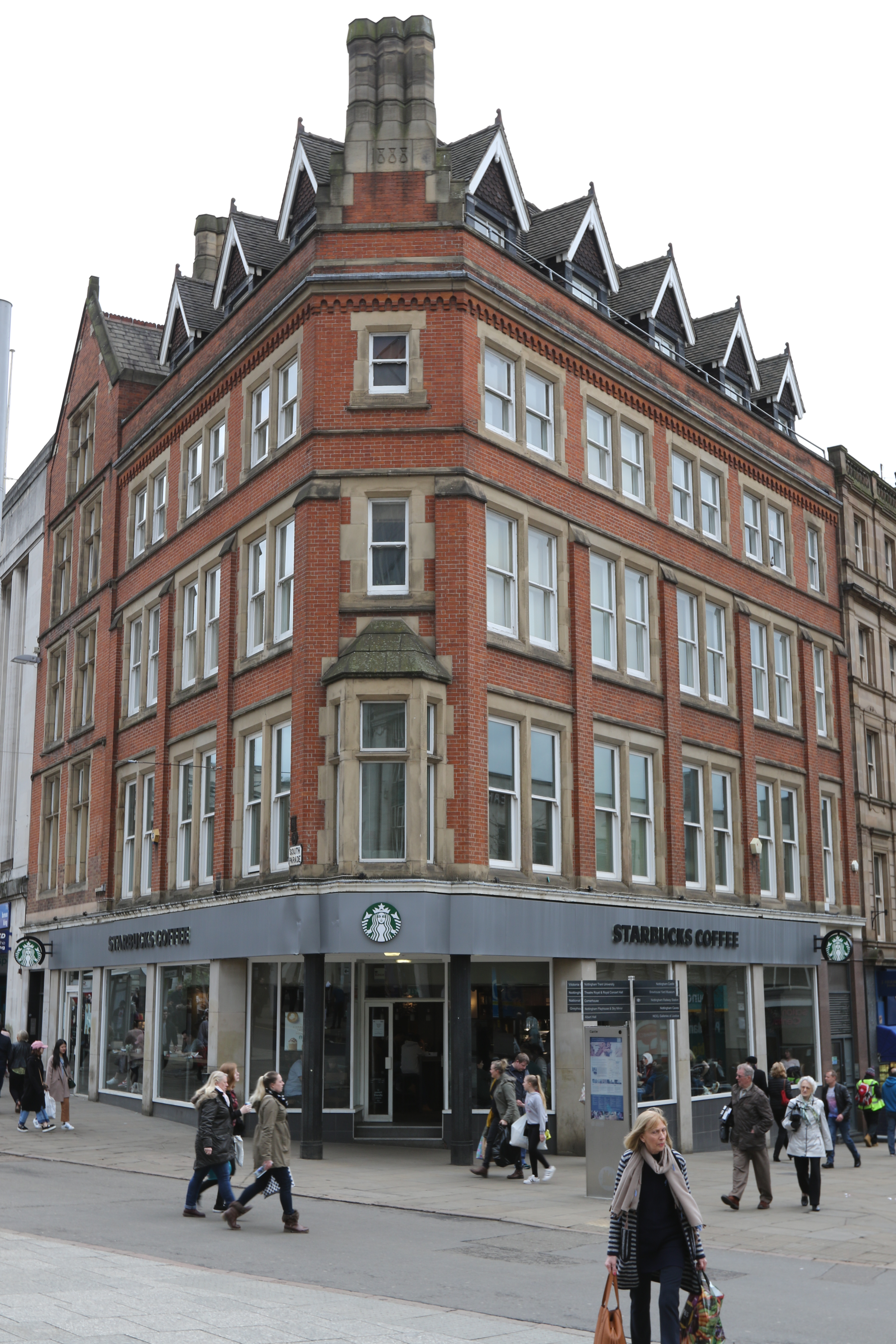
1–3 South Parade and Wheeler gate, 1888

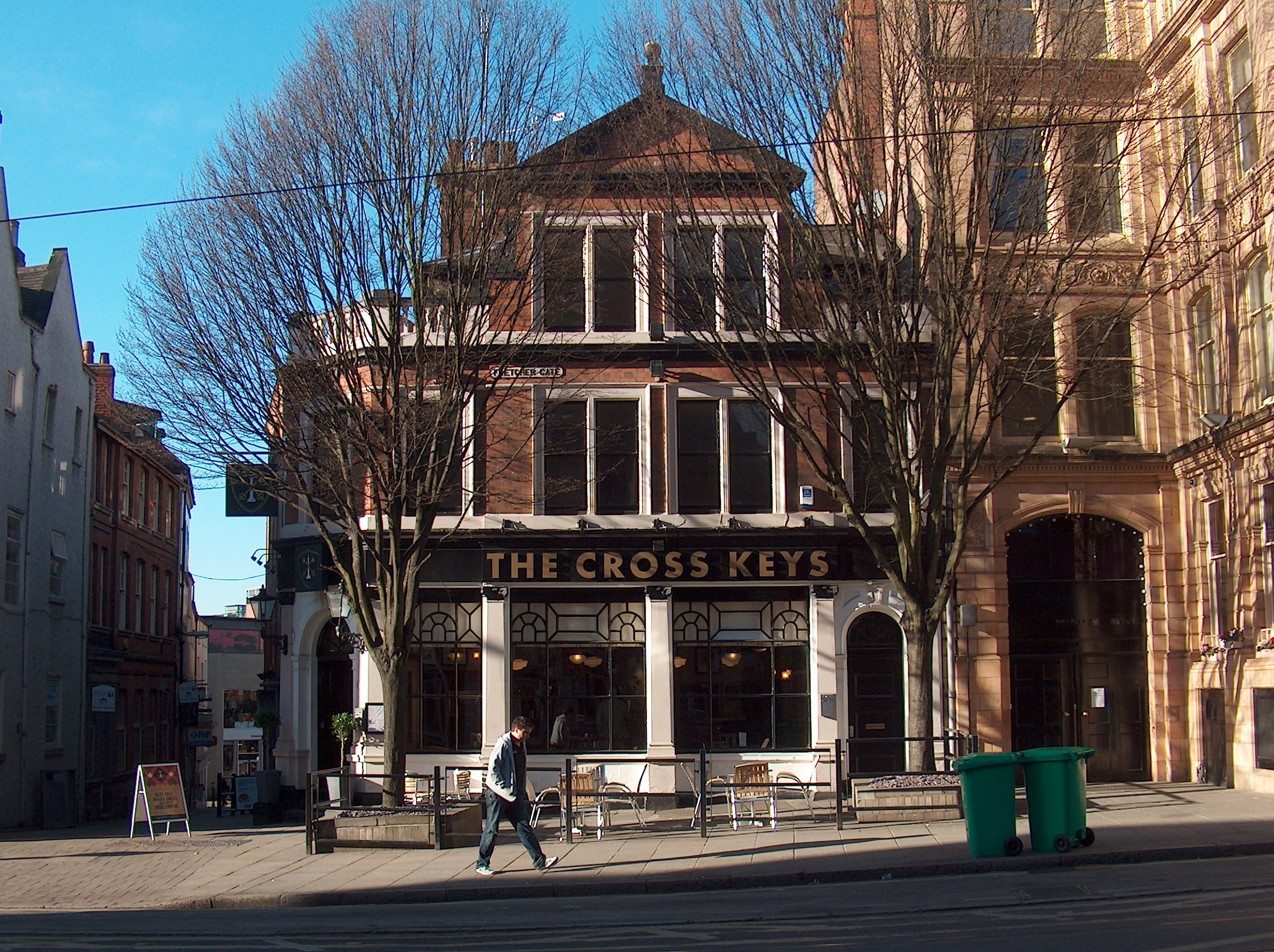
Cross Keys, 1899

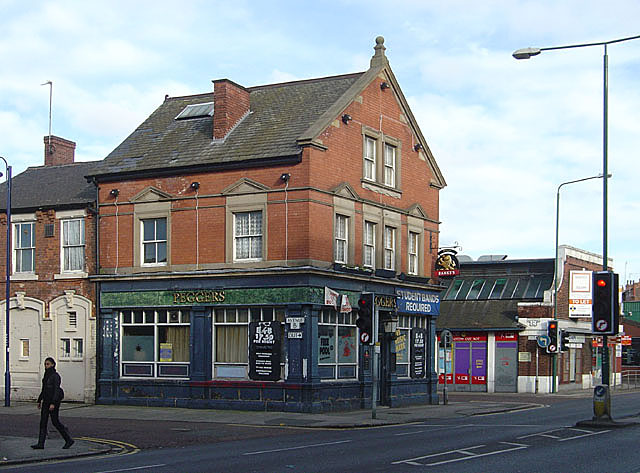
Pegger's Inn, 1905–06

Robert Evans FRIBA, JP (11 November 1832 – 19 July 1911) was an English architect based in Nottingham.

== History ==
He was born on 11 November 1832 in West Hallam, Derbyshire, the son of Robert Evans (1802-1864) and Jane Attenborough (1815-1881).

He trained as an architect and in the 1850s was taken on as a pupil by Thomas Chambers Hine with whom he formed a partnership in 1857 which lasted until 1867. Evans then set up on his own in Eldon Chambers, with an assistant William Jolley (1837–1919). The partnership of Evans and Jolley was established in 1871 and lasted until 1894.

He was appointed a Fellow of the Royal Institute of British Architects in 1888.

Robert Evans married Sarah Ann Mulcock on 11 February 1858 in St Martin's Church, Stamford and they had six children:

- Edith Mary Evans (1859–1935)
- Alice Ann Evans (b. 1862)
- Robert Evans Jun. (1863–1927)
- Ethel Frances Evans (1865–1951)
- Mary Evans (b. 1866)
- Dorothy Evans (1875–1958)

His son, Robert Evans Jun. (1863–1927) was articled to the firm, and eventually entered into a partnership with his father as Evans and Son.

He died on 19 July 1911 and left an estate of £32,221 8s. 6d.(equivalent to £4,144,700 in 2023). A new reredos by Albert Toft in St Peter's Church, Nottingham was dedicated in 1913 in his memory.

== Works ==
- Nottinghamshire Club, Victoria Street, Nottingham 1868
- St Andrew's Church, Goldsmith Street 1869–1870
- Lewis and Grundy ironmongers shop, Victoria Street, Nottingham 1870 extended in 1873 with Jolley
- St Michael's Church, Breaston 1871 restoration
- Imperial Fire and Life Insurance Office, 16–18 Victoria Street 1872
- Club, 12 Victoria Street, Nottingham 1872 with Jolley
- Birkin Brothers lace warehouse, 16 Stoney Street, Nottingham 1872 with Jolley (plus additions in 1881)
- St Mary's Schools, Bath Street, Nottingham 1872–74 with Jolley
- Holy Trinity Church, Kirk Ireton 1873 with Jolley. Restoration.
- St Andrew's Church, Stanley, Derbyshire, 1874 rebuild.
- St Peter's Church, Nottingham 1875 with Jolley. Renewal of the chancel and north transept
- St John the Baptist Church, Beeston 1876 with Jolley. Addition of organ chamber.
- St Mary the Virgin's Church, Weston-on-Trent, 1876–77 with Jolley. Restoration.
- St Augustine's Church, Basford, Nottingham 1877 with Jolley. North aisle added 1884. Chancel 1895.
- St Jude's Church, Mapperley 1877 with Jolley.
- Mackworth, Derbyshire 1877 vicarage
- All Saints' Church, Cotgrave 1877–78 with Jolley. Restoration.
- Warehouse, Stanford Street, Nottingham 1878–79
- St Peter's Church, Stapenhill, Derbyshire 1880
- People's College, College Street, Nottingham 1881, 1891–92 and 1897 all additions with Jolley
- Paton House, University of Nottingham 1881 with Jolley
- Miss Cullen's Almshouses, Nottingham 1882–83 with Jolley
- Hart, Fellow's and Company Bank, Bridlesmith Gate, Nottingham 1884 with Jolley
- Priory Church of St Anthony, Lenton 1884 restoration with Jolley
- 25–29 Wheeler Gate, Nottingham 1885.
- Nottingham High School chemistry laboratory and lecture theatre 1886
- Shop, 1–3 South Parade and Wheeler Gate, Nottingham 1888 with Jolley
- Lenton Firs, University of Nottingham 1888 with Jolley and 1903 with Robert Evans Jun. remodelling
- House and shop, South Parade, Nottingham 1889 with Jolley
- Warehouse, 11 Warser Gate, Nottingham 1890 with Jolley
- Nottingham Hospital for Women, Castle Gate, Nottingham 1890 with Jolley. New central entrance.
- St Wilfrid's Church, Egginton, Derbyshire, 1891–92 restoration
- 17–21 Houndsgate, Nottingham. Warehousing for James Snook & Co, drapers and haberdashers 1894–95 with Jolley.
- Pub, 36 Market Street, Nottingham 1895 with Robert Evans Jun.
- Bank, Victoria Street, Nottingham 1895–97 with Robert Evans Jun.
- Nottingham Board School, Collygate Road, 1898–99 with Robert Evans Jun.
- Cross Keys public house, Fletcher Gate, Nottingham 1899 with Robert Evans Jun.
- Imperial public house, St James' Street, Nottingham 1903 with Robert Evans Jun.
- Fox and Grapes public house, Sneinton Market 1905–06 with Robert Evans Jun.
- 46 St Mary's Gate 1907 with Robert Evans Jun.
- Catholic Church & presbytery, Melbourne, Derbyshire 1907–09
- Fairholme, 13 Lenton Road, Nottingham 1910 with Robert Evans Jun. Extensions.
