= Breaston Cricket Club =

Amateur cricket club based in Breaston, Derbyshire, England

Team information
- Founded: 1836
- Home ground: Soldiers and Sailors Sports Ground, Breaston

History
- Div L wins: 1
- Div M wins: 1
- Official website: Breaston Cricket Club

Breaston Cricket Club is an amateur cricket club based in Breaston, Derbyshire, England. The club has a history dating back to the early 19th century and has played in the South Nottinghamshire Cricket League.

== Ground ==
The Breaston CC home ground is based on the Soldiers and Sailors Sports Ground, Risley Lane, Breaston, Derbyshire.

== History ==
The earliest known record of cricket from Breaston dates back to a match report in the Nottingham Journal between Breaston and Sandiacre, dated 21 October 1836. The site of the original ground is not known, but a field somewhere in the Poplar Road area is locally believed to be the place. In 1908, Breaston started playing on the west side of Sawley Lane until 1932 when the club move just outside of the village boundary to Pegg's field off Wilsthorpe Road, Long Eaton, which is now partially obliterated by the M1 Motorway. By 1939, the club moved back to the western side of Sawley Lane onto a field owned by a Mr A.W. Perks, after being given a 5-year lease and a new pavilion. After a break of activity due to the Second World War, the club led a peripatetic existence until it found a site on Fields Farm, located on the east side of Sawley Lane in 1955. By the early 1960s, the club had to move again after brief spell on West Park, Long Eaton, and moved to what is now known as the Soldiers and Sailors Sports Ground, on Risley Lane.

The club's history shows that its main focus was playing friendly matches, but the occasional appearance in competitive leagues is known. Up until recently, Breaston CC fielded 2 senior teams: a League XI team (1st XI) in the South Nottinghamshire Cricket League, and a Friendly XI team (Sunday 1st XI).

== Club Performance ==
The South Nottinghamshire Cricket League competition results showing the club's positions in the league (by Division) since 2005.

Key
Gold	Promoted
Red	Relegated

cont...
K	Division K
L	Division L
M	Division M
N	Division N

South Nottinghamshire Cricket League
	2005	2006	2007	2008	2009	2010	2011	2012	2013	2014	2015
1st XI	L	L	L	K	L	M	N	N	M	L	L

== Club Honours ==
South Nottinghamshire Cricket League
Division L	Champions	2007
Division M	Champions	2013
Division N	Champions	2012

== See also ==
- Club cricket
