= William Dymock Pratt =

English architect

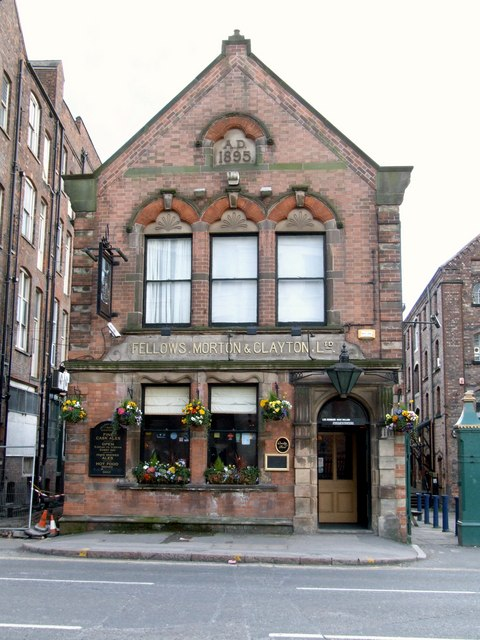
Fellows Morton & Clayton offices, Canal Street, Nottingham, 1895, now a public house.

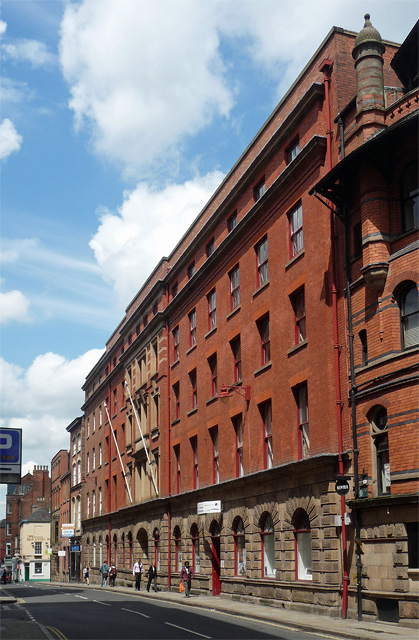
Warehouses for A. Schmidt, 21-27 Stoney Street, Nottingham, 1910

William Dymock Pratt (22 December 1854 – 12 August 1916) was an architect based in Nottingham, England

== Biography ==
Pratt was born in Sneinton on 22 December 1854, the son of Nathan Pratt of Gedling Lodge in Nottinghamshire. He was articled to W. H. Martin, and then with Adams and Kelly in Leeds. From 1877 to 1884 he was in partnership with James Edwin Truman as Truman and Pratt, at Cauldon Chambers, Long Row, Nottingham. From 1884, he practised alone in Nottingham.

On 4 September 1884 he married Lillian Edith Cropper, eldest daughter of Alderman Cropper, of Nottingham. They had two daughters, Murial Edith Amy Pratt (b. 1885) and Gwendoline Ursula Pratt (b.1890).

He died on 12 August 1916 at Bleasby, Nottinghamshire, leaving an estate valued at £17,556 11s. 11d. (equivalent to £1,503,600 in 2023).

== Works ==
- Granby Hotel, Carrington Street, Nottingham 1886 with James Edwin Truman
- St Matthew's Church, Talbot Street Nottingham 1887 restoration and re-ordering
- Bakery, Bridlesmith Gate, Nottingham 1890
- Brick section of Debenhams, Long Row, Nottingham 1893–96
- Fellows Morton & Clayton offices, Nottingham, 1895 (now public house)
- The Theatre Royal, Lord Haddon Road, Ilkeston 1895
- Hardstaff Warehouse, Canal Street, Nottingham 1897 (Now Via Fossa)
- Warehouse and Bakery, 17 Castle Gate, Nottingham 1897
- Rutland Estate Office, Lord Haddon Road, Ilkeston 1898 (Now Rutland Chambers)
- Cotswold House, Lord Haddon Road, Ilkeston 1898
- Gresham Hotel, Carrington Street, Nottingham 1898-99
- King's Walk, Upper Parliament Street, Nottingham 1901
- Middle Warehouse, Hollowstone, Nottingham 1904
- The Orchard, University of Nottingham 1904
- University Club, University of Nottingham 1906-07
- Warehouses for A. Schmidt 21-27 Stoney Street, Nottingham 1910
