= Western Mere Secondary School =

Defunct school in Derbyshire, England

Coordinates: 52.898403°N 1.326808°W

- Breaston, Derbyshire; England

Information
- Established: 1957
- Closed: 1990

Western Mere Secondary School was a school in Breaston, Derbyshire. Established in 1957, the school was located on Gregory Avenue until it was closed in 1990 and demolished in 1992. The area is now used a grazing area for horses, though the old school is still visible on the ground with the floors still visible.
