= Carrington Street, Nottingham =

Street in central Nottingham, England

Carrington Street
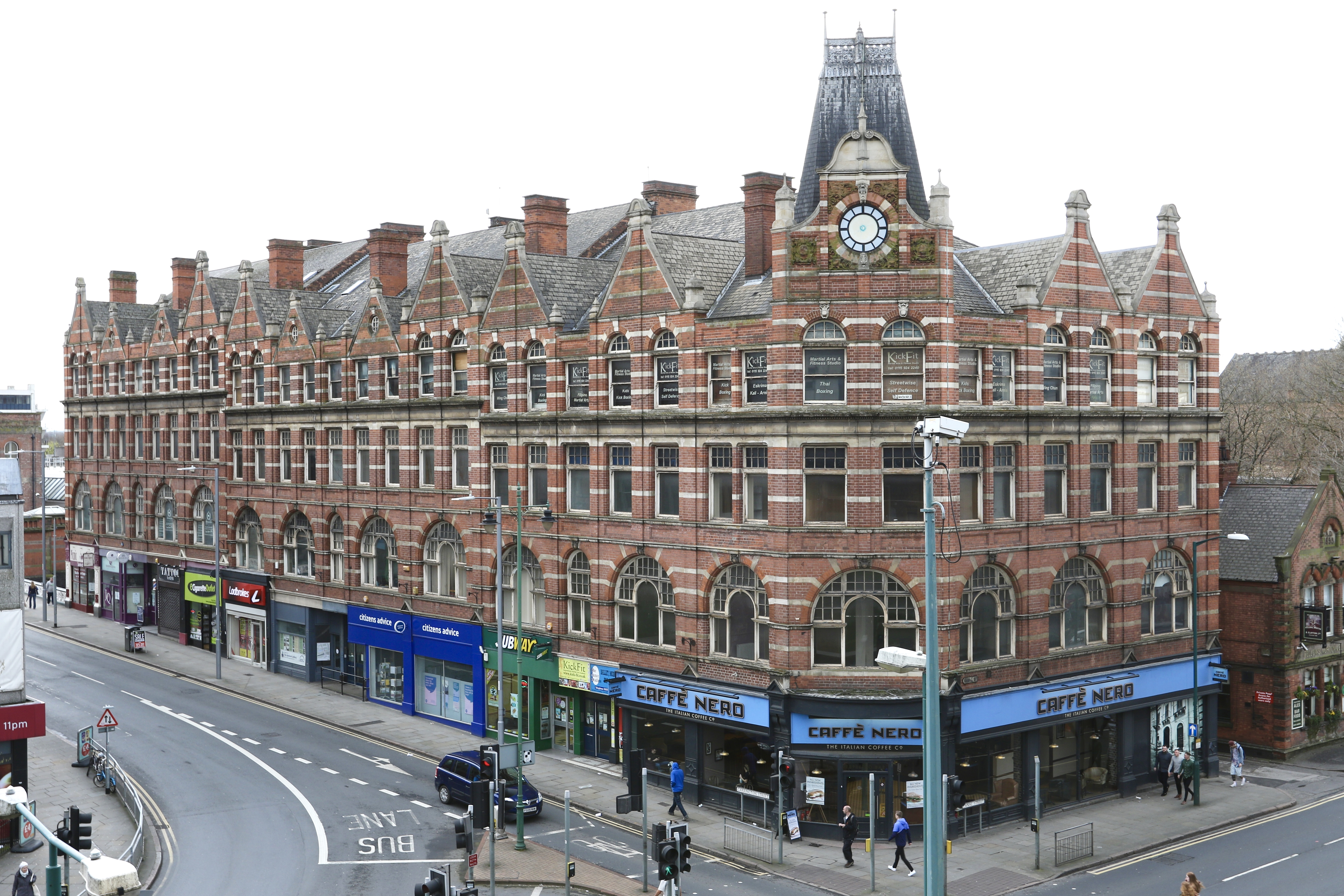
- Former Redmayne and Todd sportswear shop by Gilbert Smith Doughty of 1896-97

- Location within Nottingham
- Maintained by: Nottingham City Council
- Coordinates: 52°56′53.21″N 1°8′51.45″W

Carrington Street is a street in Nottingham city centre between Nottingham station and Broadmarsh.

== History ==
The street was laid out by Henry Moses Wood, Surveyor in 1828. The opportunity offered by the construction of this new road was taken to install a large culvert 10 feet (3.0 m) in circumference as a storm drain, to carry water to the River Leen. The River Leen was dredged by approximately 4 feet (1.2 m) to provide additional capacity.

In 1842 a bridge was constructed over the Nottingham and Beeston Canal to provide access to Nottingham Carrington Street railway station. The bridge costing £6,000 (equivalent to £590,000 in 2025) was partly sponsored by the Midland Counties' Railway. It contained an inscription which read:

This bridge was commenced in August, 1841, J.M.B. Pigot M.D., Mayor, and completed in October, 1842, R. Morley Esq., Mayor, H.M. Wood, Architect.

The bridge was widened in 1904 when the new Nottingham station was erected.

Having crossed the canal, the street arrived at Nottingham Carrington Street railway station. In 1846 the Derby to Nottingham railway line was extended to Lincoln and this necessitated a level crossing over Carrington Street. A wooden footbridge was provided to alleviate delays. This remained in use until the construction of a viaduct over the railway in 1867-68 at a cost of £35,000 (equivalent to £3,420,000 in 2025) designed by Marriott Ogle Tarbotton.

In 1878 the Nottingham and District Tramways Company Limited opened a horse drawn tramway service between Trent Bridge and St Peter's Church. This was electrified in 1901 and tramway services continued provided by Nottingham Corporation Tramways until withdrawn in 1936.

== Notable buildings ==
- 2, Offices for Post Office Engineers with ground floor shop. 1913-14 Robert Evans (Jun).
- 4 to 16, Gordon House showrooms and offices. GG Hardy 1926. Now Bhatia Best Solicitors
- 18, offices 1913 by Robert Evans (Jun) for F Hillam
- 20, shop. 1913 by FM Ketton
- 22, former Midland Bank, later petrol service station and offices for Anglo-American Oil Co. 1923 by Albert Nelson Bromley
- 28 to 48, Former Redmayne and Todd sportswear shop, 1896-97 by Gilbert Smith Doughty
- 50, Midland Railway goods offices and low-level covered platforms, dating from 1875. The offices are now a hearing centre for the Employment Tribunal, and the platforms provide car parking for Nottingham Magistrates' Court.
- Granby Hotel, 1886 by James Edwin Truman and William Dymock Pratt.
- Gresham Hotel, 1898-99 by William Dymock Pratt
- 111, Nottingham and Nottinghamshire Bank 1900 by Watson Fothergill later the Allied Irish Bank, now Fletcher’s offices.
- Bentinck Hotel, 1904-05 by Walter Owen Hickson
- Nottingham station 1903-04 by Albert Edward Lambert
