= Robert Evans (Jun) =

English architect (1863–1927)

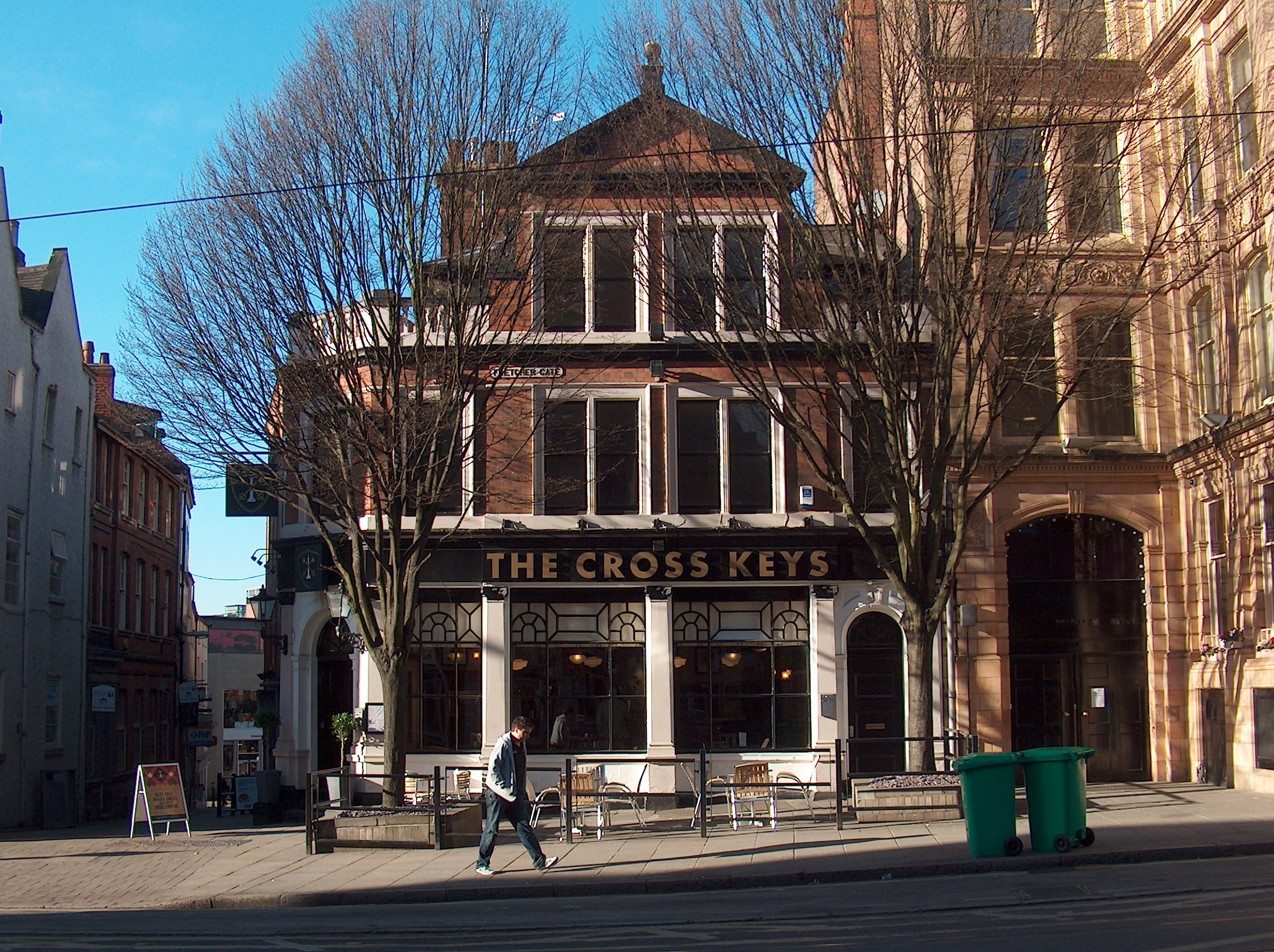
Cross Keys, 1899

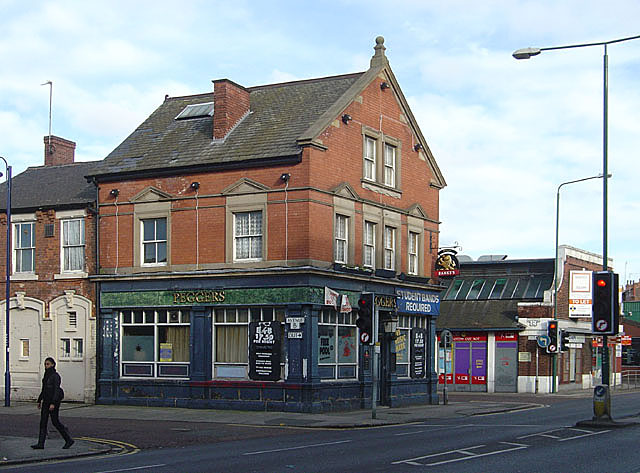
Pegger's Inn, 1905-06

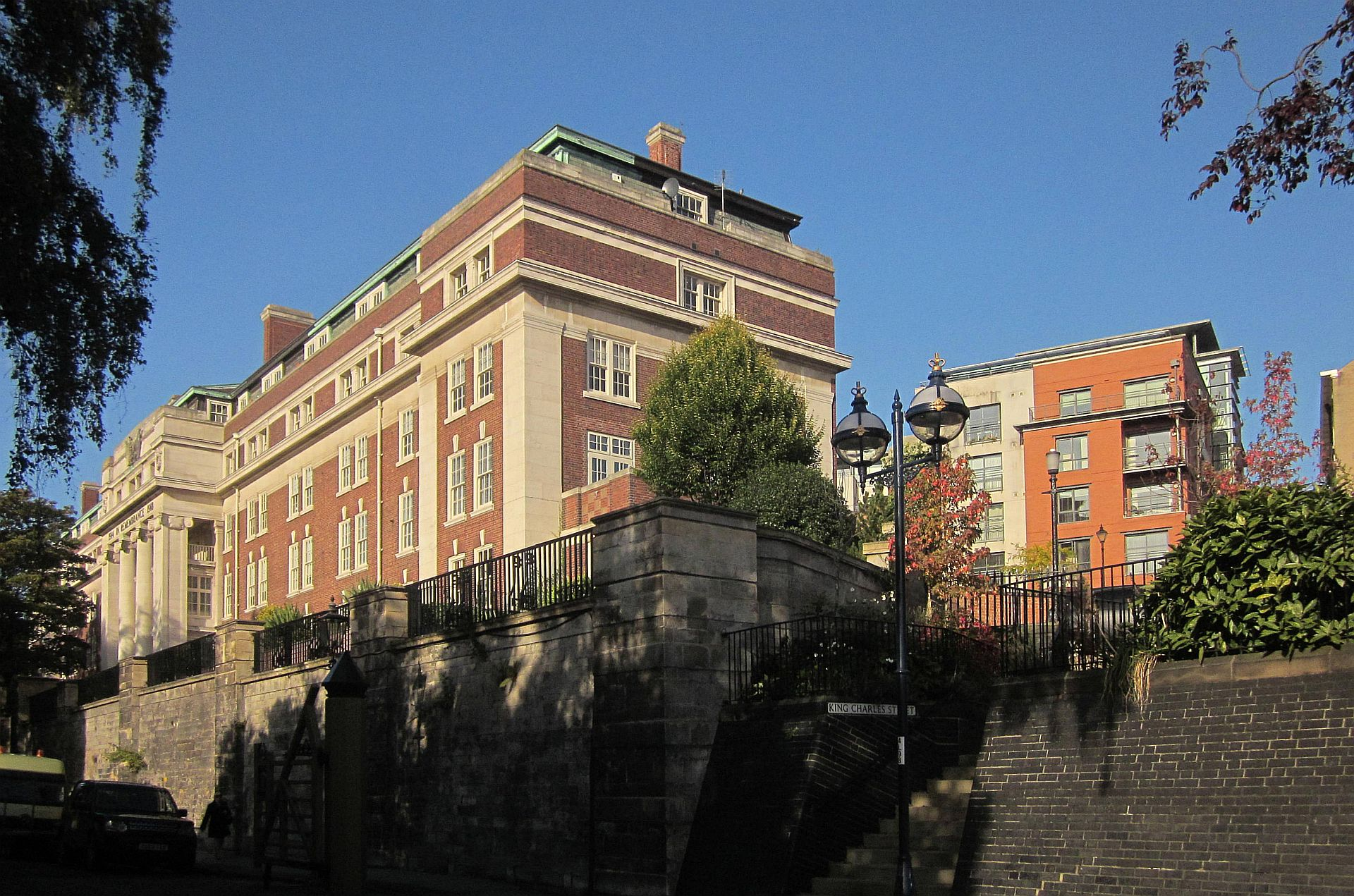
Nurses’ Home, General Hospital, Nottingham 1919-23

Robert Evans FRIBA (25 February 1863 – 16 August 1927) was an English architect based in Nottingham.

== History ==
He was born on 25 February 1863, in Nottingham, the son of Robert Evans JP and Sarah Ann Mulcock.

He was educated at Rugby School and then articled to the firm of Evans and Jolley, in which his father was a partner. In 1894, when William Jolley left the partnership, father and son set up in partnership as Evans and Son. After the death of his father he was in a partnership with John Thomas Clark and John Woollatt as Evans, Clark and Woollatt.

He was appointed a Fellow of the Royal Institute of British Architects in 1905

Robert Evans married Constance Katherine Holland, daughter of Charles Ashby Holland on 19 April 1893 at Hartshill, Staffordshire. They lived in Ravine House, Lenton Road, The Park, Nottingham and had three children:

- Gwendolin Mary Evans (b. 1894)
- Edith Cecily Evans (b. 1896)
- Robert Holland Evans (b. 1904)

He died on 16 August 1927 and left an estate of £18,425 0s. 10d.(equivalent to £1,389,200 in 2023).

== Works ==
- Pub, 36 Market Street, Nottingham 1895 with Robert Evans JP.
- Bank, Victoria Street, Nottingham 1895-97 with Robert Evans JP.
- St Michael's Church, Breaston 1895-99 with Robert Evans JP restoration and new vestry
- Nottingham Board School, Collygate Road, 1898-99 with Robert Evans JP.
- Cross Keys public house, Fletcher Gate, Nottingham 1899 with Robert Evans JP.
- Lenton Firs, University of Nottingham 1903 with Robert Evans JP remodelling
- Imperial public house, St James’ Street, Nottingham 1903 with Robert Evans JP.
- Fox and Grapes public house, Sneinton Market 1905-06 with Robert Evans JP (now Peggers)
- 46 St Mary's Gate 1907 with Robert Evans JP
- Catholic Church & presbytery, Melbourne, Derbyshire 1907-09 with Robert Evans JP
- Fairholme, Lenton Road, Nottingham 1910 with Robert Evans JP. Extensions.
- 18 Carrington Street, offices 1913 for F Hillam
- 2 Carrington Street, Offices for Post Office Engineers with ground floor shop. 1913-14
- St Peter's Church, Nottingham 1914 restoration
- Nurses’ Home, General Hospital, Nottingham 1919-23
- Commercial Union offices, High Street, Nottingham 1922
- Ropewalk wing, General Hospital, Nottingham 1927
- James Store, Carrington Street, Nottingham
- Collin’s (Firs) Maternity Hospital, Sherwood 1926-27
- Thomas Forman and Sons’ factory, Hucknall
