= Listed buildings in Breaston =

Breaston is a civil parish in the Erewash district of Derbyshire, England. The parish contains six listed buildings that are recorded in the National Heritage List for England. Of these, one is listed at Grade I, the highest of the three grades, and the others are at Grade II, the lowest grade. The parish contains the village of Breaston, and the listed buildings consist of houses, a former farm building, and a church.

== Key ==
Grade	Criteria
I	Buildings of exceptional interest, sometimes considered to be internationally important
II	Buildings of national importance and special interest

== Buildings ==
Name and location	Photograph	Date	Notes	Grade
St Michael's Church; 52.89707°N 1.31755°W		11th century	The church has been altered and extended through the centuries, and the vestry was added in 1895. It is built in stone with lead roofs, and consists of a nave with a north clerestory, a north porch, a south aisle, a chancel with a south vestry, and a west steeple. The steeple has a tower with two stages, and a blocked west doorway with a semicircular head, imposts and a keystone, over which is a lancet window. On three sides are clock faces, the bell openings are double lancets, and at the top is a broach spire with ogee-headed lucarnes.	I
6 Church View; 52.89678°N 1.31832°W		17th century	A timber framed farmhouse with brick infill and a tile roof. There are two storeys, 3 1/8 bays, and a single-storey extension on the south. On the front is a lean-to porch, the windows are casements, and inside there is a large inglenook fireplace, and exposed timber framing.	II
Manor Farmhouse; 52.89866°N 1.31594°W		Early 18th century	The farmhouse is in red brick with vitrified headers, on a plinth, with floor bands and a slate roof. There are two storeys and attics, and three bays. The central doorway has a moulded surround and the windows are sashes, all with cambered heads.	II
Barn east of Manor Farmhouse; 52.89868°N 1.31531°W	—	Mid 18th century	The threshing barn, later used for other purposes, is in red brick with a tile roof. There is a single storey, three bays, and a single-storey extension to the north. On the front are doorways, windows and vents.	II
39 Main Street; 52.89691°N 1.31897°W	—	Early 19th century	A red brick house with a sawtooth eaves band and a tile roof. There are two storeys, four bays, a single-bay extension to the south, and a staircase tower at the rear. On the front is a semicircular-headed doorway with a fanlight and an open pediment on brackets. The windows are sashes, those in the ground floor with cambered heads. In the extension is a horizontally-sliding sash window.	II
Rose Cottage; 52.89782°N 1.31732°W		c. 1840	The cottage is in buff brick with painted dressings and a tile roof. There are two storeys, a symmetrical front of two bays, and a rear service range. In the centre is a gabled porch, and the windows are sashes with wedge lintels. Above the porch is a plaque with the name of the cottage.	II
