= Victoria Street, Nottingham =

Street in Nottingham, England

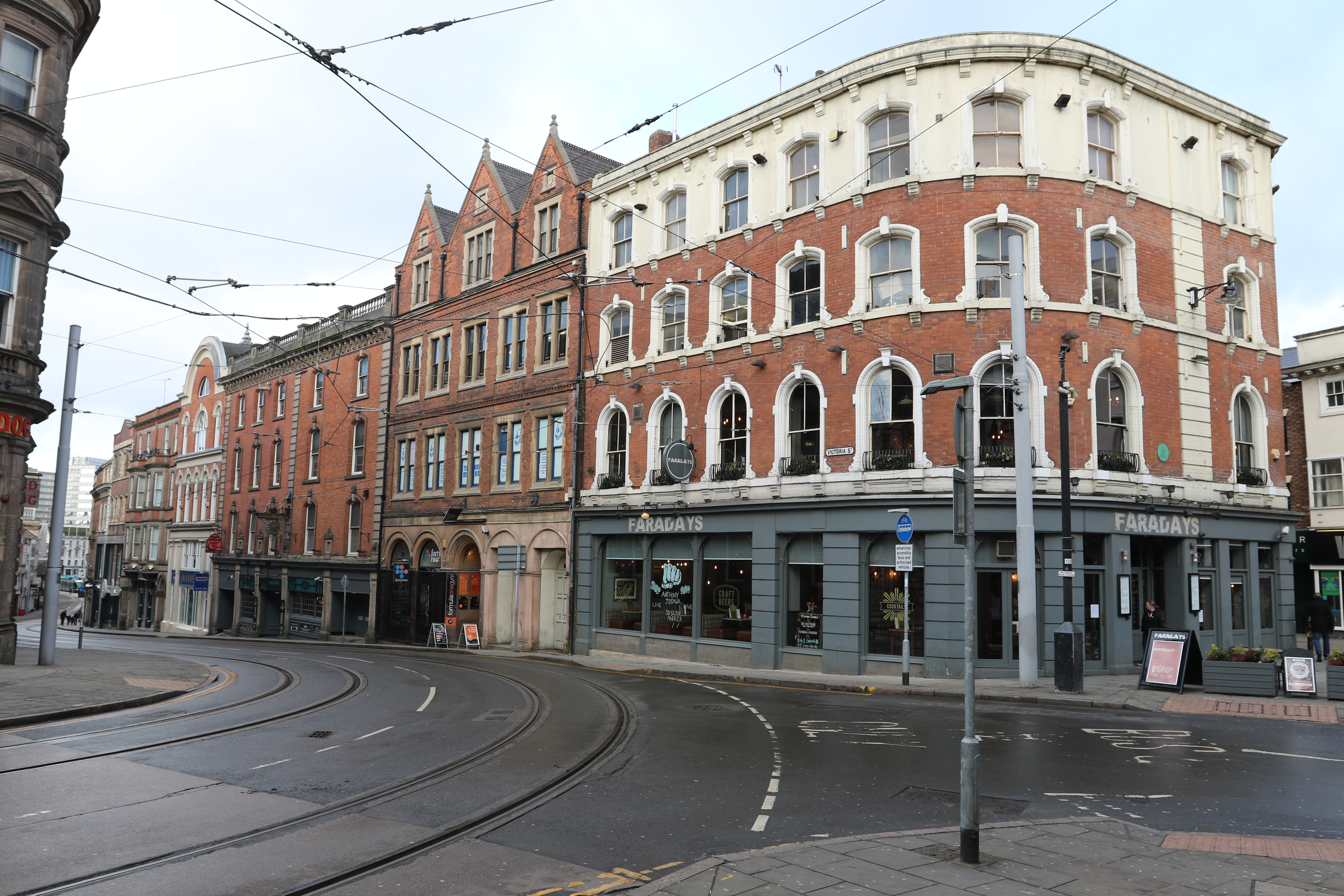
- A view from the top of the street.

- Location within Nottingham
- Maintained by: Nottingham City Council
- Coordinates: 52°57′11.6″N 1°8′46″W

Construction
- Construction start: 1862
- Completion: 1863

Victoria Street, Nottingham is a shopping street in the city centre of Nottingham, England located between Bridlesmith Gate and Fletcher Gate.

== History ==
Victoria Street was planned by Marriott Ogle Tarbotton the Nottingham borough engineer and formed in 1862. The town improvement committee decided on 24 July 1862 on the name. The Nottinghamshire Guardian of 25 July 1862 noted that:

At first sight, it would seem a subject of regret that Victoria Street has not taken a direct line; but, should the south side be made in a corresponding curve, a crescent effect will be produced, with those splendid vanishing lines and bold shadows which more than justify the departure from the popular predilection in favour of straight streets. We believe we are justified in anticipating that Victoria Street, if carried out in confirmity with its commencement, will be a palatial avenue erected on the ruins of slums.

The street was constructed with a subway 170 yards (160 m) long for services such as mains water and telegraph wires. It was the first road service subway constructed in the UK under a street outside of London. The Victoria Street subway was illuminated in 1875 on the occasion of a visit from the Derbyshire Engineers, and their president, Lord Edward Cavendish.

In the Pevsner Architectural Guide for Nottingham, Elain Harwood describes Victoria Street as retaining sobriety and grandeur through the consistently palazzo-like buildings on the south side.

== Notable buildings ==
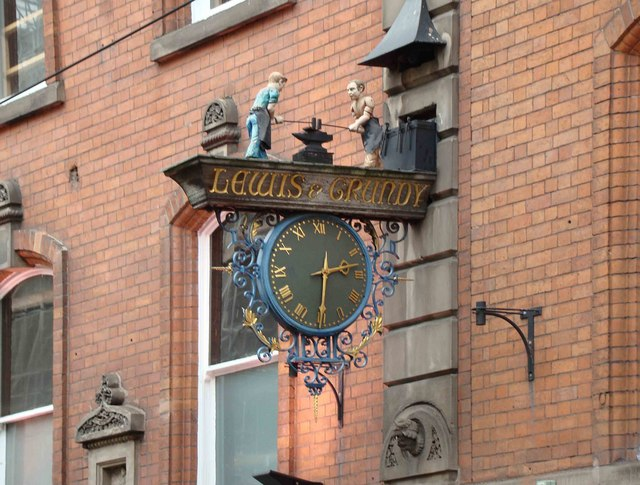
The Lewis and Grundy clock of 1950

=== North side ===
- 17 Pit and Pendulum 1870 Grade II listed. Built for Lewis & Grundy, ironmongers by Robert Evans, and extended by Evans and Jolley in 1873. The wall clock by G. & F. Cope was added in 1950

=== South side ===
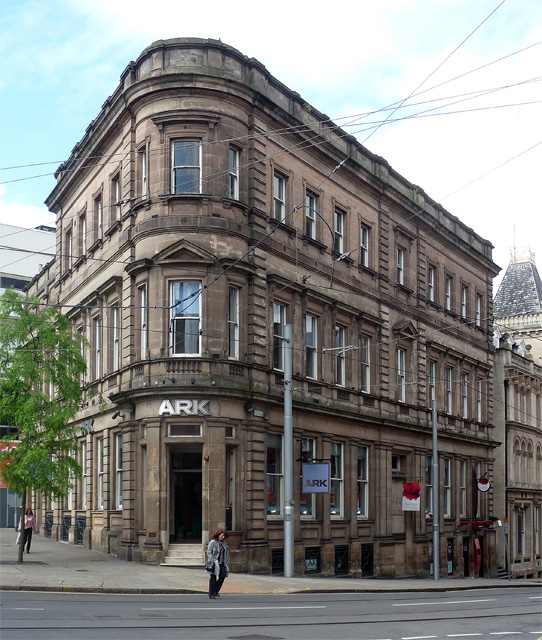
Imperial buildings

- 2 Former Nottinghamshire Club 1868 by Thomas Chambers Hine and Robert Evans.
- 6 French Connection 1896-97 Grade II listed. Built by Robert Evans and Son. Extended 1920–21 in the same style.
- 12 Delilah 1872 Grade II listed. Office building built by Evans and Jolley.
- 16 1870 Grade II listed. Imperial Fire & Life Insurance Company building by Robert Evans, converted in 1913 to the Reform Club by William Beedham Starr.
- 20-22 Imperial Building 1868 Grade II listed. Post office and telegraph office built by Williams of London. Additional floor added in 1883 by Edward G. Rivers.
