= Adams Building, Nottingham =

Listed building in Nottingham, England

Adams Building
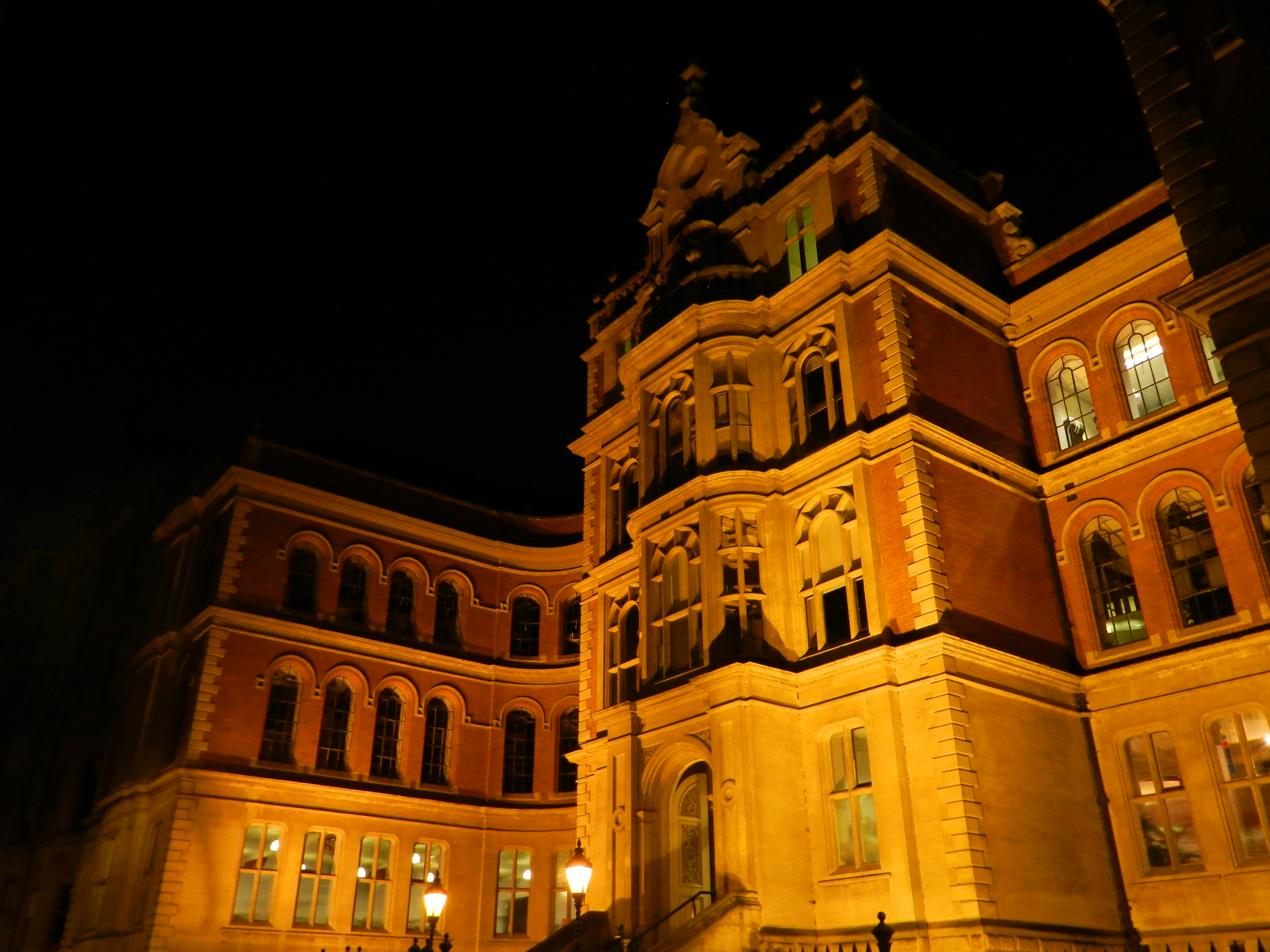
- Adams Building - principal entrance at night

- Location within Nottingham

General information
- Location: Lace Market, Nottingham, England
- Coordinates: 52°57′08″N 1°8′36″W
- Opened: 1855
- Renovated: c. 1862 and c. 1865 (rear additions) c. 1880 (north addition)
- Client: Thomas Adams

Design and construction
- Architect: Thomas Chambers Hine

Listed Building – Grade II*
- Official name: Adams Building and attached railings
- Designated: 12 July 1972
- Reference no.: 1270430

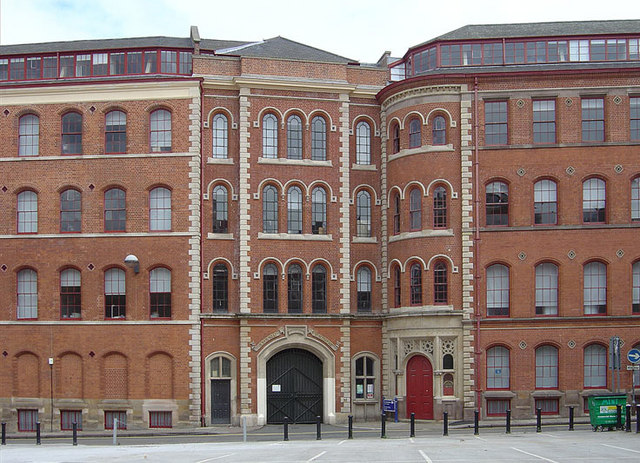
The Adams Building (rear entrance)

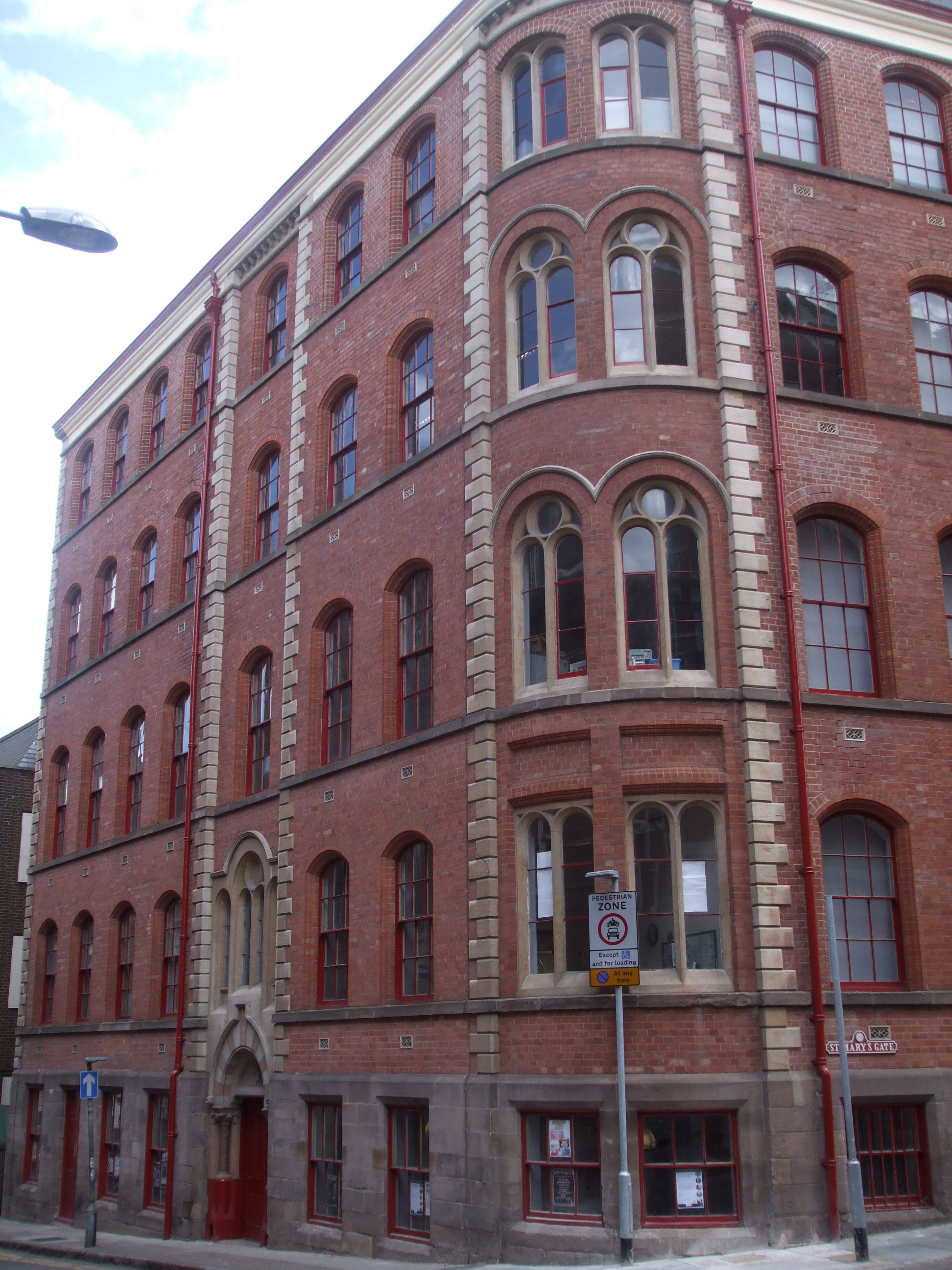
Exterior of rear section – The Adams Building.

The Adams Building, formerly the Adams and Page warehouse on Stoney Street, is the largest building in the Lace Market district of the city of Nottingham in England.

Now Grade II*-listed by Historic England, the Adams Building was formerly a lace showroom and warehouse. Since 1999, it has formed part of the city campus of what is now Nottingham College.

== Background ==
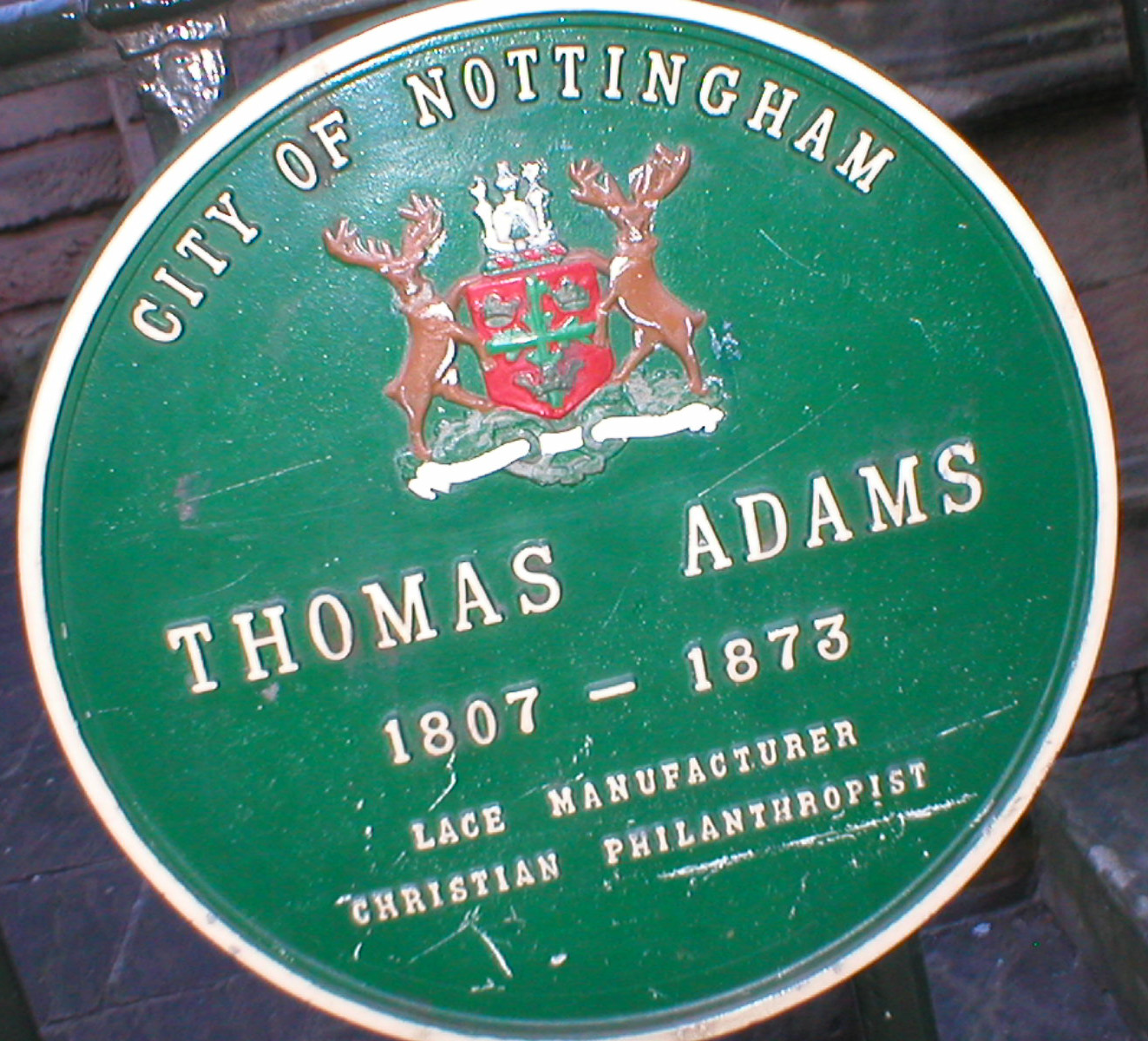
'Green Plaque' honouring Thomas Adams – The Adams Building.

Opened on 10 July 1855, the building is named after its original owner Thomas Adams (1807–1873), a Victorian industrialist with strong Quaker views and a deep social conscience. He selected the Nottingham architect Thomas Chambers Hine and between them, they created a building which, for a variety of social and architectural reasons, is quite unique.

== Phase I ==
As it now exists, the Adams Building is the product of several distinct phases of construction from 1854 to around 1874. The earliest phase is the building facing Stoney Street, with its elaborate symmetrical frontage behind a railed courtyard. It was designed as a lace showroom and warehouse, in which lace products brought in from outlying factories were finished off and then sold. The main display area seems to have been a two-storey lightwell in the centre of the building (now closed up), originally lit by decorative gas lamps; approached by a grand staircase. Secondary areas were used for mending and packing. The main power-source was a steam engine to the rear, with hydraulic engines for the hoists and packing machines.

Maximum lighting was provided for the lace repair and finishing shops. Hine provided 'lace lofts' at roof level whose walls were almost entirely built from glass. These lace lofts were innovative in their time and quickly became a characteristic of Nottingham's then-thriving lace manufacturing industry. This architectural motif can still be seen (along with more modern interpretations) throughout the Lace Market today.

As a committed philanthropist, Thomas Adams was determined to provide humane conditions and good facilities for his workforce. A large area of the basement (now Floor B) was designed as a chapel (with a company chaplain and vestry) where more than 500 workers and managers would take part in a service before starting work. Indoor toilets, washing facilities and tea rooms were provided for staff, and there are records of a sick fund, savings bank and book club.

Heating was provided by a mixture of coal and patent warm-air flues brought through ducts from a heat exchanger at the boiler. These amenities were at the forefront of mid-Victorian factory design, and the Adams factory was regarded as a model example of its kind by contemporary factory inspectors.

=== The architecture of Phase I ===
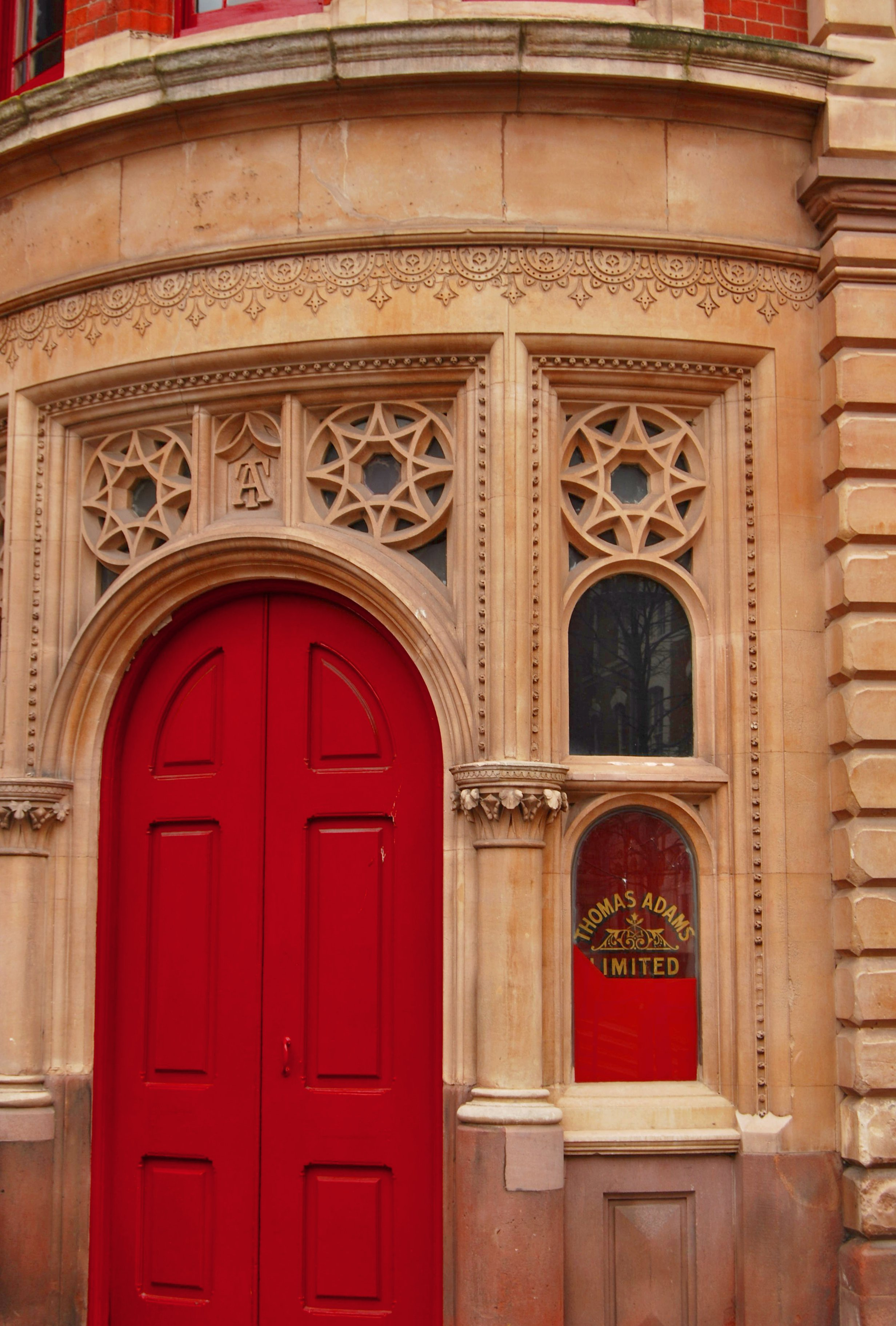
Adams Building rear door.

TC Hine adopted a distinctly 'Anglo-Italian' style for the principal elevations. In places, this appears redolent of the 15th-century Palazzo Ricardi in Florence, Italy. His chosen materials were plain brick, moulded brick and local Derbyshire and Ancaster stone (often exchanged for rendering at high levels for economy). By giving a high priority to the appearance of the elevations, Hine had to adjust the level of some of the internal floors and allow some floors to cut across windows, so as not to spoil the overall intended effect.

At the time, the size and grandeur of the building was in contrast with the other plainer industrial buildings in the vicinity. A local newspaper described it as the 'finest erection in the Midlands!'

== Later phases ==
The building was later extended along St Mary's Gate to the rear, and finally, along Warser Gate. In the process, this incorporated a building at the end of King's Place. Although externally, this appears to be of minor interest, this is a rare survivor of a tenement lace or hosiery factory, dating from the early 19th century, and was used at various times in its early life as a Roman Catholic chapel. These later blocks were much more plain and functional, and it is possible that they were built speculatively, perhaps for rent as tenement lace factories.

Extra steam engines were installed to serve these new blocks, and massive cast-iron doors fitted at intersecting walls to prevent the spread of fire. (Some of these fireproofing doors remain in-situ, and have become part of the fabric of the restored building). A new heating and ventilation system was installed in the later blocks, using fresh air from wall ventilators drawn over hot steam pipes. Hine continued to experiment structurally, the timber floor beams of the original building giving way progressively to cast-iron beams, rivetted wrought-iron girders, rolled-iron beams and (possibly) early mild-steel beams, as each of these materials became available.

As completed, the complex had 113,000 square feet (10,500 m^{2}) of floor space over six floors, eight principal staircases and three minor staircases. Over the intervening years many alterations were made, including the addition of new goods lifts, the replacement of the original boiler chimney, the removal and insertion of staircases, and internal conversions. On St Mary's Gate, the decorative turret and clock tower above the main entrance stairwell was replaced by a lift motor room crudely built in brick.

During World War II, concrete bomb shelters were built in the Stoney Street courtyard, obscuring the basement walls, and the occupation of the ground floor by the RAF for parachute storage caused serious damage to the floor and chapel below. The Adams Company closed the factory in 1950, and the building was sub-divided for use by small businesses.

== Restoration and reuse ==
In the 1980s and early 1990s, the Adams Building was in a serious state of decline, due to rising repair costs, outdated standards of workspace, and under-occupation. Many floors were structurally unsound, having sagged or failed under the weight of heavy machinery.

In 1996 the building was acquired by the Lace Market Heritage Trust, and after being considered and rejected as the new headquarters of English Heritage, was restored and converted by New College Nottingham. The £16.5 million restoration of the Adams Building helped attract further revitalisation of the Lace Market district as a whole. The project was assisted by grant aid from the Heritage Lottery Fund and European Regional Development Fund, and was a pilot scheme for the Government's Private Finance Initiative. CPMG Architects designed the refurbishment.

The Adams Building was officially reopened by Charles, Prince of Wales on 5 February 1999. In 2002 New College Nottingham was awarded the Queen's Anniversary Prize for the renovation of the building.

== See also ==
- Grade II* listed buildings in Nottinghamshire
- Listed buildings in Nottingham (Bridge ward)
