= Nottingham College =

Further and Higher Education College in Nottinghamshire

Coordinates: 52.9529°N 1.1435°W

Location
- Adams Building, Stoney Street, Nottingham; Nottingham, Nottinghamshire, England, United Kingdom

Information
- Former names: New College Nottingham; Central College Nottingham
- Type: General further education college
- Established: 8 June 2017 (by amalgamation)
- Local authority: Nottingham
- Department for Education URN: 130776 Tables
- Ofsted: Reports
- Chair of Governors: Carole Thorogood
- CEO: Janet Smith
- Staff: 1,500
- Gender: Mixed
- Age: 14+
- Enrolment: ~15,000 (full-time); ~40,000 (total)
- Website: Nottingham College
- Registered address at the Adams Building in Nottingham city centre and surrounding education centres

Nottingham College is one of the largest further education and higher education colleges in the United Kingdom. Based in Nottingham, England, it provides education and training from pre-entry through to university-degree level at its 10 centres in the city and around Nottinghamshire.

== History ==
Nottingham College is an amalgamation of two former further education colleges – New College Nottingham and Central College Nottingham.

=== New College Nottingham ===
New College Nottingham (often stylised as ncn or NCN) was formed from Arnold and Carlton College, Basford Hall College of Further Education, Clarendon College of Further Education, and the High Pavement Sixth Form College. The current campus opened in 2001.

In December 2015, New College Nottingham underwent its new inspection framework Ofsted inspection and received a Grade 2 (Good) overall, having been rated Good in all individual categories.

=== Central College Nottingham ===
Central College Nottingham was a further education college based over ten sites in Nottinghamshire. The college was formed from the merger of Castle College Nottingham and South Nottingham College. South Nottingham College was founded in 1970 in West Bridgford, while Castle College Nottingham was founded on 1 June 2006 from the merger of Broxtowe College and The People's College in Nottingham. The People's College was the oldest further education college in England, having been founded in 1847. Following a public consultation, which ran from December 2010 to January 2011, it was decided that Castle College Nottingham and South Nottingham College should merge. The colleges officially merged on 1 July 2011. The merged college was renamed 'Central College Nottingham' in November 2012.

=== 2017 merger ===
On 8 June 2017, New College Nottingham merged with Central College Nottingham to form Nottingham College, one of the largest colleges in the UK, with around 40,000 full-time and part-time students.

== The college today ==
The college is a general further and higher education college and offers a range of courses corresponding to the ISCED band 4 and 5.

- Vocational Courses
- Apprenticeships
- A-Levels
- Access Courses
- Higher Apprenticeships
- Foundation Degrees (Higher Education) (level 5) Bachelor's degrees and top-up degrees. (level 6)

== Industrial action (2019) ==
In 2019, after a ballot where 96% of lecturers agreed to uphold strike action, the college experienced a strike by members of the University and College Union (UCU) which lasted for 15 days during September and October.

The strike began with a boycott of the college's development day – Festival of Learning – on 1 July 2019. In protest, the UCU branch organised its own Festival of Yearning gathering outside of the Clarendon campus.

The strike was a response to the college's intention to impose new staff contracts involving a potential reduction in pay, sick leave and holidays, with the threat of dismissal for those who refused to sign. Prior to the dispute-end in November 2019, a further 14 day period of action was planned and the college had asked Acas (Advisory, Conciliation and Arbitration Service) to mediate.

An online pamphlet was later created by retired union members which examines the dispute in context of the recent history of further education in the city, and gives an account of the dispute background before and during the strike action. The pamphlet title – containing the word "revolution" – is a reference to the then-CEO, John van de Laarschot's claim in a 2017 speech at the Local Enterprise Partnership D2N2 annual conference, partially published in local press, that under his leadership, "Nottingham College will lead a revolution" in the further education sector that would include "tough love" for youngsters without the skills employers wanted. In November 2021, John van de Laarschot announced his intention to leave the college "at the end of the year".

== Courses ==
=== GCSEs ===
Students can take or retake a GCSE subject with the college. A pass at Grade C is usually needed to progress to A-level and University level courses.

=== A-level courses ===
A-levels are the traditional entry route to universities, and a sixth-form college has been the option chosen by students that want, at 16, to leave the security and restrictions of a secondary school. There are entry requirements to each course, students must have evidence of success at GCSEs, and normally have a pass of Grade C or above in a related subject. They will study 3 or 4 subjects. Nottingham College offers over 20 popular subjects, including a limited range of languages and more specialised subjects. All the academic subjects are studied at High Pavement Sixth Form, though Art and Textiles at Stoney Street and Photography at the Adams Building.

=== University-level courses ===
Nottingham College offers a range of university-level courses at undergraduate level recognised by the Quality Assurance Agency for Higher Education (QAA) in partnership with higher education institutions including Nottingham Trent University, The Open University, University of Derby and Edexcel.

== Locations ==
Nottingham College operates 10 centres around the city. Former key centres include Beeston, Clarendon, Clifton and Maid Marian Way. These were removed from the college's estate to help fund and build the "City Hub" on disused brownfield land next to the Broadmarsh Centre and tram overpass at the foot of Lace Market Cliff.

=== Adams Building ===
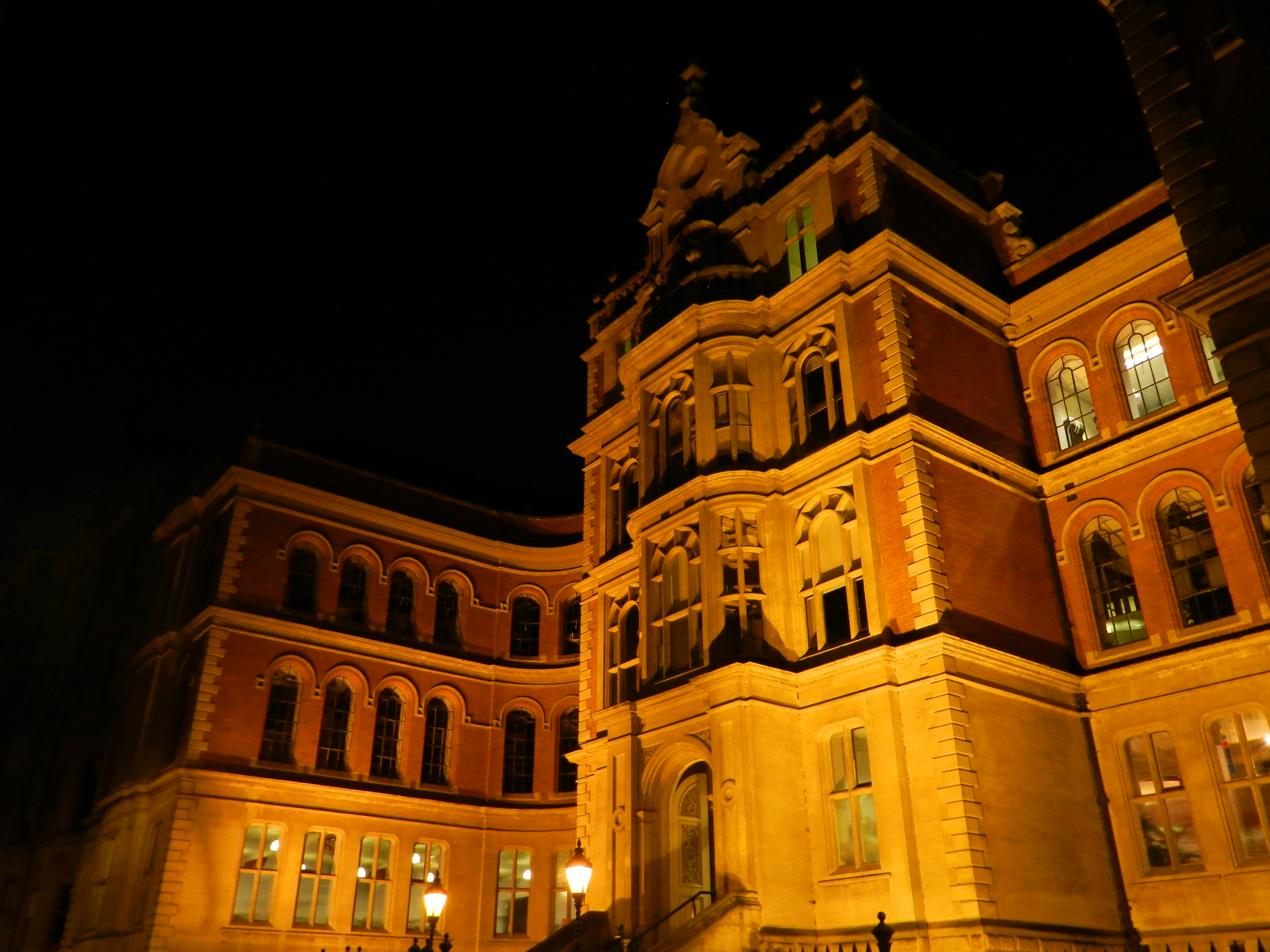
The Adams Building – illuminated – February 2012

The Adams Building opened in 1998 with a focus for the college's Higher Education provision as well as art and design, fashion and textiles, business, digital media and GCSEs courses.

Much of the provision is delivered in the Grade II listed seven-storey Adams Building, a converted lace factory on Stoney Street in the historic Lace Market, and at the nearby School of Art and Design. Specialised facilities include a three-camera TV studio, a radio broadcasting station, and fashion design/manufacturing studios.

=== Basford ===
The Basford centre off Stockhill Lane, on the north-western edge of the city, focusses on construction technologies with an emphasis on vocational courses. The centre has specialist facilities for bricklaying, plumbing, gas, painting and decorating, carpentry and joinery, plastering, refrigeration, tiling, welding, heating and ventilation and electrical services.

In September 2015 the centre was refurbished. The £27m rebuilding project followed a £9m investment by the Skills Funding Agency.

=== City Hub ===
The college's estate includes a purpose-built state-of-the-art 'City Hub' in Nottingham city centre. The City Hub offers new facilities and resources for students, plus community facilities such as a new training restaurant (Fletchers Restaurant), café and performing arts centre. Building work started on the £58 million project in May 2018 and was originally set to be completed by September 2020, but due to the COVID-19 pandemic and restrictions, construction work was delayed. The new opening date was January 2021 to coincide with the start of the Spring Term.

It is a six-storey building designed by the Sheffield architectural practice of Bond Bryan. Constructed by Wates, it provided training and employment opportunities including 24 work placements, 16 new jobs, 13 apprentice placements and training for 11 NVQs.

The City Hub is part of the wider Broadmarsh regeneration plans, led by Nottingham City Council.

=== Highfields ===
Highfields is located on University Boulevard. Created in association with Toyota, the centre has ten workshops, a car showroom and a learning resource centre.

=== High Pavement Sixth Form ===
High Pavement is a dedicated A-Level centre on Chaucer Street in the heart of the city's academic district. The £6.3 million building was designed by Ellis Williams Architects; it has six floors with classrooms and computer suites, a Learning Resource Centre and a café.

==== High Pavement history ====
The Sixth Form College was previously the 11–18 'High Pavement Grammar School', first established in 1788 as the 'Unitarian Day Charity School' behind the High Pavement Chapel on High Pavement, in the Lace Market area. From 1895 until 1955, the school was in Stanley Road in Forest Fields, then moving to the Bestwood Estate.

High Pavement Grammar School competed in Top of the Form on the BBC Light Programme against Wyggeston Girls' School (it became Regent College, Leicester) on Monday 14 November 1950; the programme had been recorded on 18 October 1950. The school team made it to the semi-final of the England section (with four sections for each nation) on Monday 11 December 1950, where the team was beaten 35–28 by Woking County Grammar School for Boys, who next competed against Manchester High School for Girls in the England final.

Later a boys team took on a team from Northampton High School for Girls, in heat 5, on Sunday 17 October 1965 at 6pm on the Light Programme.

The headmaster Harry Davies appeared on a discussion programme on the BBC Home Service on Thursday 29 August 1957 at 9.15pm entitled The Leicestershire Experiment, about a scheme in parts of Leicestershire for early comprehensive schools starting September 1957. The Director of Education for Leicestershire, who featured in the discussion, described the 11 plus as 'an offence against reason and public conscience' – he most disliked the 'segregation' of children. The host of the discussion was Stuart Maclure, later the editor of the Times Educational Supplement. . On Wednesday 16 July 1958 on the Home Service, Harry Davies appeared in a discussion programme entitled Should the grammar school go?, with Ronald Bielby, the headmaster of Huddersfield New College, and Dame Margaret Miles, the headmistress from 1952 to 1973 of Mayfield School, a girls' grammar school on West Hill, Wandsworth in Putney, (and a well-known strong advocate for comprehensive schools; but Mayfield School as a comprehensive never lasted, and had to close in 1986) The headteacher appeared on a radio programme on Wednesday 30 January 1963 at 8pm called The Universities and Higher Education: Signposts for Expansion on the Third Programme (since 1967 Radio 3) and on Monday 15 May 1961 at 7.30pm, he appeared on a Network Three on the radio programme Starting a Career, a radio series of twelve programmes, in an episode called What does it lead to?, with the host Brian Groombridge, part of a collection of radio series called Listen and Learn. The programme was repeated on the Home Service on Wednesday 27 December 1961.

With the introduction of comprehensive education in Nottingham, the grammar school became High Pavement Sixth Form College in 1975, and in 1999 merged into New College Nottingham. It moved to its current site on Chaucer Street in 2001.

=== London Road ===
The centre, which is five minutes from Nottingham station and tram terminus, is the college's technology centre. It has three automotive workshops with 32 ramps as well as general engineering facilities. London Road closed in July 2025 and returned to its landlord in September 2025. The college’s automotive centre moved to Highfields and Ruddington campuses.

=== Ruddington ===
This centre is home to Emtec Colleges Limited as well some of the industry's training providers. Training takes place in facilities in Ruddington where automotive training in conjunction with motor manufacturers has been taking place for over 15 years.

=== Stapleford ===
The centre provides specialist facilities for students with a range of physical and learning difficulties and disabilities as well as for other Foundation Learning courses. Stapleford campus closed in 2025 with its students relocating to the Basford Campus - The Gateway.

=== Wheeler Gate ===
Your Look Hair and Beauty Salon, located on Wheeler Gate (just off Old Market Square) is a modern industry-standard commercial salon dedicated to hair and beauty courses and open to the public. The salon was originally completed in September 2014 and was officially opened in November 2014 under the name Salon Central by British hairdresser Beverly C MBE.

== NILA ==
The New College Nottingham International Lifestyles Academy (NILA) opened its campus in Gurgaon, India on 22 January 2013 in partnership with the Batra Group. NILA was NCN's first overseas campus and offered British higher-education qualifications (BTEC Higher National Diplomas) in Hospitality Management, Interactive Media, Retail Management and Fashion Management. Programmes were designed by the college in consultation with employers, in line with Indian National Skill Development Corporation (NSDC) priorities. The college in 2014 decided to withdraw from the project.

== Notable alumni ==
Former students of the college include:

- Finn Atkins, actress
- Richard Beckinsale, actor
- Samantha Beckinsale, actress
- Sarah Connolly, mezzo-soprano
- Natalie Duncan, musician
- Carl Froch, boxer
- Robert Lindsay, actor
- James Morrison, singer and songwriter
- Su Pollard, comedy performer, singer and actress
- Mark Pollicott, mathematician
- Steven Price, Oscar-winning composer

=== High Pavement Grammar School ===
- John Bird, satirist (1948–55)
- Peter Bowles, actor (1948–55)
- Michael Breheny, Professor of Planning 1991–2003 at the University of Reading
- John Burnett, social historian
- Prof Kenneth Burton, Professor of Biochemistry 1966–88 at Newcastle University, 1954–66 at the MRC Unit for Research in Cell Metabolism, Oxford
- Louis Essen, physicist who invented the caesium atomic clock and determined the speed of light (1920–27)
- Prof Anthony Cross, Professor of Slavonic Studies 1985–2004 at the University of Cambridge (Fitzwilliam College), Roberts Professor of Russian 1981–85 at the University of Leeds, Chairman 2001–05 of Academia Rossica, Reviews Editor since 1971 of the Journal of European Studies, and winner of the 1997 Alec Nove Prize
- Simon House, violin player
- Freda Jackson, actress
- Stanley Middleton, author and 1974 Booker Prize winner (1930–37)
- Trevor Morley, footballer
- Ken Olisa, businessman and former Reuters board member, the first British-born black man to serve on the board of a FTSE 100 company and the first black Lord-Lieutenant of Greater London (1963–70)
- Tim Robinson, cricket umpire and former Nottinghamshire cricket captain
- Harold Shipman, serial killer (1957–64)
- Sir Arthur Elijah Trueman, Professor of Geology 1937–45 at the University of Glasgow, and President 1945–47 of the Geological Society (1905–12)
- John Turner (actor) (1943–50)
- Philip Voss, actor
- Sir Rowland Wright, Chairman 1975–78 of ICI, Chairman 1978–83 of Blue Circle Industries, Chancellor 1984–91 of Queen's University Belfast (1927–34)

=== Forest Fields Grammar School ===
- Graham Allen, Labour MP 1987–2017 for Nottingham North
- Sir David Nicholson, Chief Executive 2011–14 of the National Health Service
