= Breaston =

Village in Derbyshire, England

Coordinates: 52.898°N 1.314°W

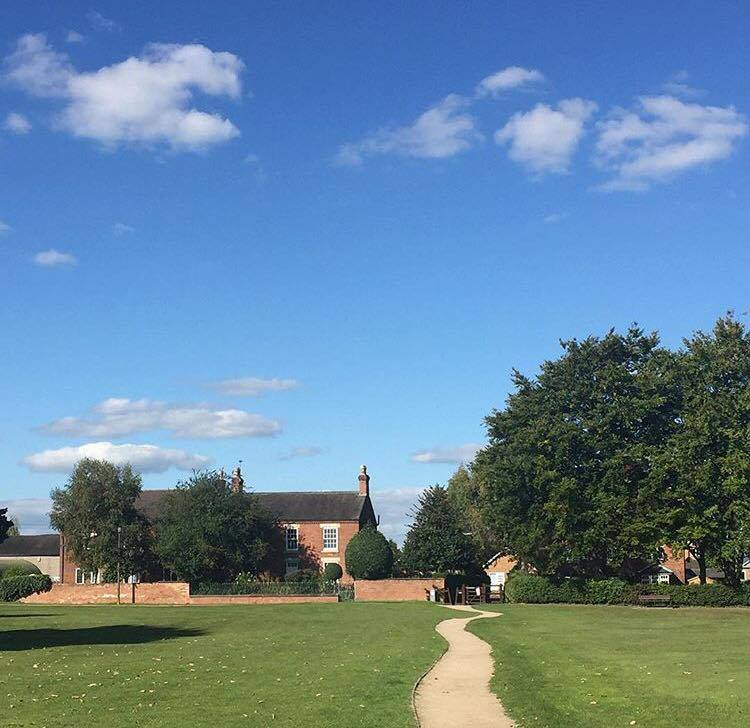
- Duffield Close, Breaston

- Location within Derbyshire
- Area: 3.1100529 sq mi (8.055000 km^{2})
- Population: 4,455 (2011)
  - Density: 1,432/sq mi (553/km^{2})
- OS grid reference: SK462336
  - London: 108.99 mi (175.40 km)
- Civil parish: Breaston
- District: Erewash
- Shire county: Derbyshire
- Region: East Midlands
- Country: England
- Sovereign state: United Kingdom
- Post town: DERBY
- Postcode district: DE72
- Dialling code: 01332
- Police: Derbyshire
- Fire: Derbyshire
- Ambulance: East Midlands
- UK Parliament: Erewash
- Website: Breaston Parish Council

Breaston (/ˈbriːstən/ BREE-stən) is a large village and civil parish in the Erewash district, in the south-east of Derbyshire and lies approximately 6.81 miles (10.96 km) east of the city of Derby and 8 miles (13 km) west of the city of Nottingham. The population of the civil parish as taken at the 2011 Census was 4,455. The settlement name Breaston means 'Braegd's farm/settlement': (Old English) for a personal name and 'tūn' (Old English) for either an enclosure, farmstead, village, etc.

== History ==
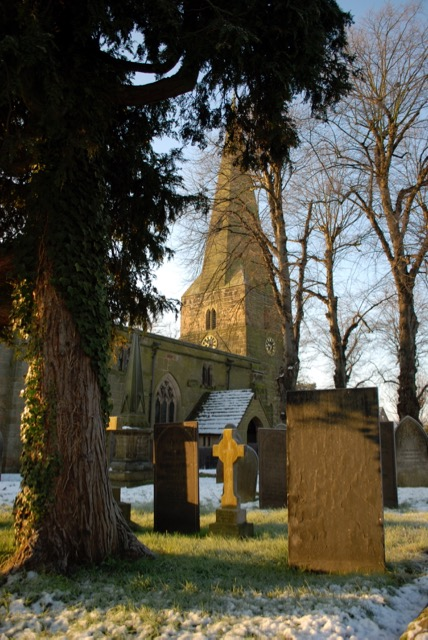
St Michael's Church

Mentioned in the Domesday Book Survey of 1086, Breaston was a settlement in the Hundred of Morleystone wapentake and the county of Derbyshire. It had an estimated population of 15.8 households in 1086. At the time it was mentioned as belonging to Henry de Ferrers (Henry was given a large number of manors in Derbyshire including land in Swarkestone, Markeaton, Sinfin and Cowley) and being worth four shillings. The village Church of St Michael is a Grade I listed building. Structural parts of the interior, for example "double-chamfered pointed arches on octagonal piers" appear to be of 11th century in origin. The village of Breaston is clearly visible on the 1648 map of Derbyshire, produced (in Latin) by the Dutch cartographer Joan Blaeu, written as "Braston".

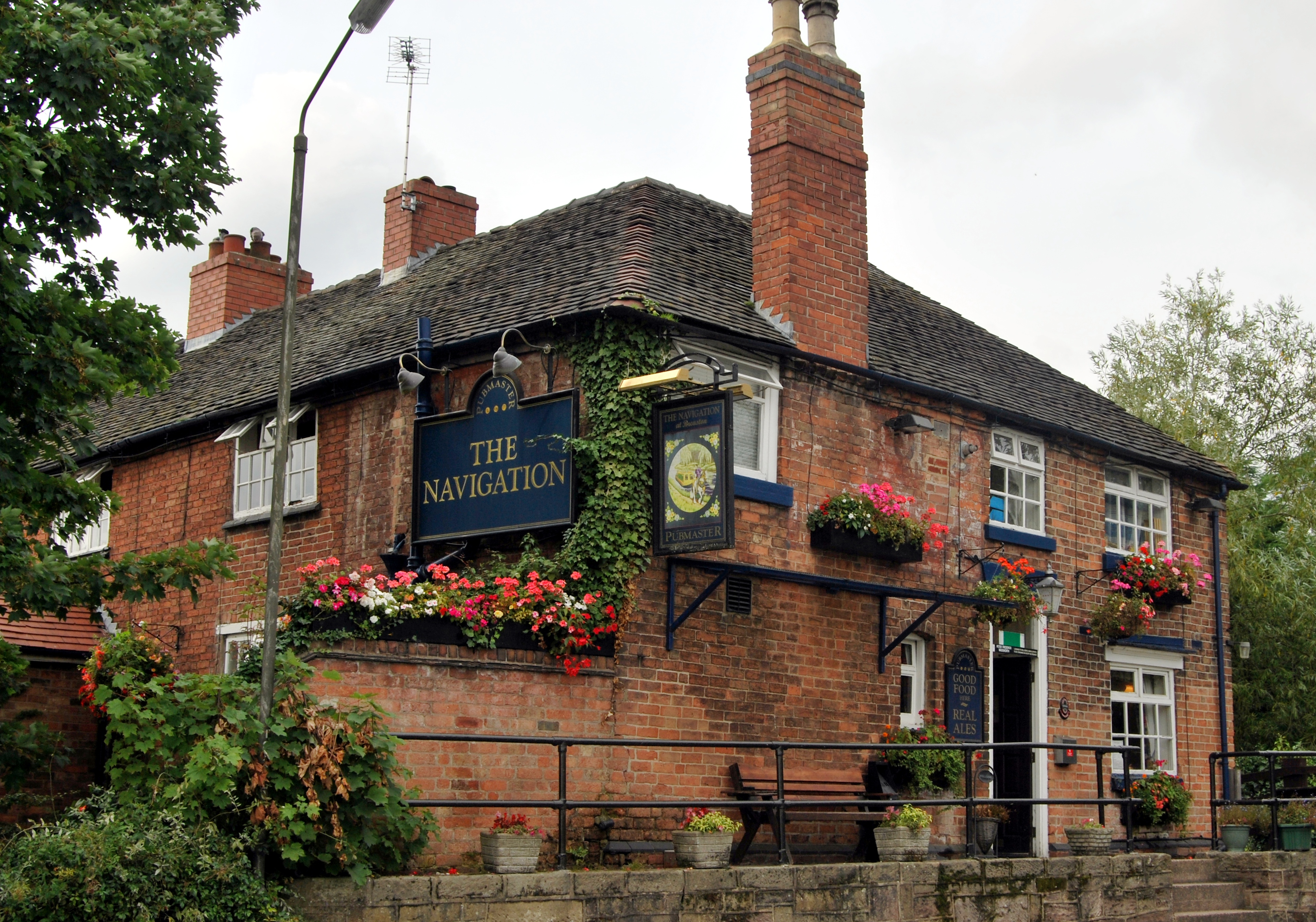
The Navigation

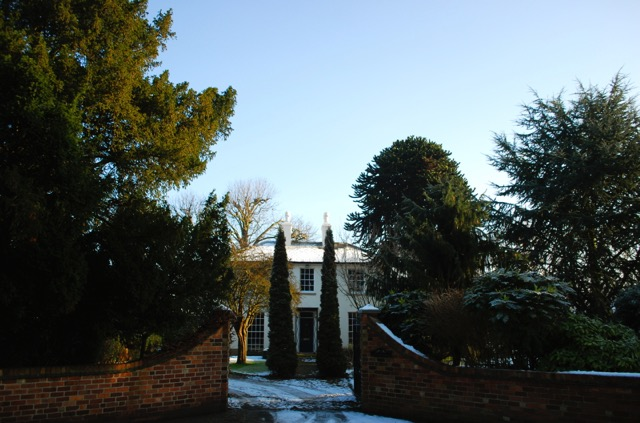
Risley Lane, Breaston

Breaston today is mainly residential. There is the church (St Michael), a primary school, a Methodist chapel, three pubs (three of them still named as they were in 1846 - The Bulls Head, Chequers Inn and The Navigation Inn); a medical centre and a comprehensive range of shops, including a Co-op, located in the centre of the village around the church and the village green. The green (known as Duffield Close) is said to be one of the largest in the country and an annual May Day Fete is held there.

=== Railway Station ===
The first Long Eaton railway station was on Sawley Lane, Breaston. First used in 1839, when the line opened, it was the third station on the line west from Nottingham. It was originally called Breaston, but the name was changed to Sawley railway station to avoid confusion with nearby Beeston.

== Sport ==
Although only a relatively small village, Breaston is home to its fair share of sports teams.

=== Football ===
Breaston Park FC, founded in 2007, is a child and youth football structure who have various teams at a range of age levels. The Club was nominated for, and won, Erewash Sports Club of the Year 2009, and YEL Small Club of the Year in 2011.

Athletica FC play on Breaston Recreation Ground (in the winter months).

=== Cricket ===
Breaston Cricket Club, formed in 1836 play on the Soldiers and Sailors Ground, Risley Lane.

== Transport ==
=== HS2 ===
In early October 2014, reports emerged that Breaston may be the preferred location for the East Midlands Hub High Speed 2 Phase Two railway station, reverting earlier plans to base the station at Toton, Nottinghamshire. These plans were ruled out by July 2015.

Trentbarton runs a bus route named 'Indigo' through the village, connecting it with Derby, Long Eaton and Nottingham up to every 20 minutes Monday to Saturday, every 30 minutes on Sundays and Monday to Saturday evenings, and every hour Sunday evenings. Nightbuses also run through until 3am towards Derby and until 4am towards Nottingham.

== Notable residents ==
- Blessed Edward James, (c.1557-1588) Catholic priest and martyr.
- Robert Smith (1848–1899), cricketer who played 103 first-class cricket matches for Derbyshire
- William Ewart Gye (1889–1952), pathologist and cancer researcher.
- Geoff Hoon (born 1953), politician and MP for Ashfield, 1992-2010; Minister of Defence, 1999-2005, now chairman of Twycross Zoo
- Kate Veale (born ca 1975), writes and illustrates children's books, she created the Mr. Moon series
- Molly Windsor (born 1997), an English actress, featured in Channel 4 film The Unloved
- Will Battershill (born 1998), a British steeple chaser and long distance athlete. In 2023 he became British Steeplechase Champion

== See also ==
- Listed buildings in Breaston
- Western Mere Secondary School
