= Bridlesmith Gate =

Street in Nottingham, England

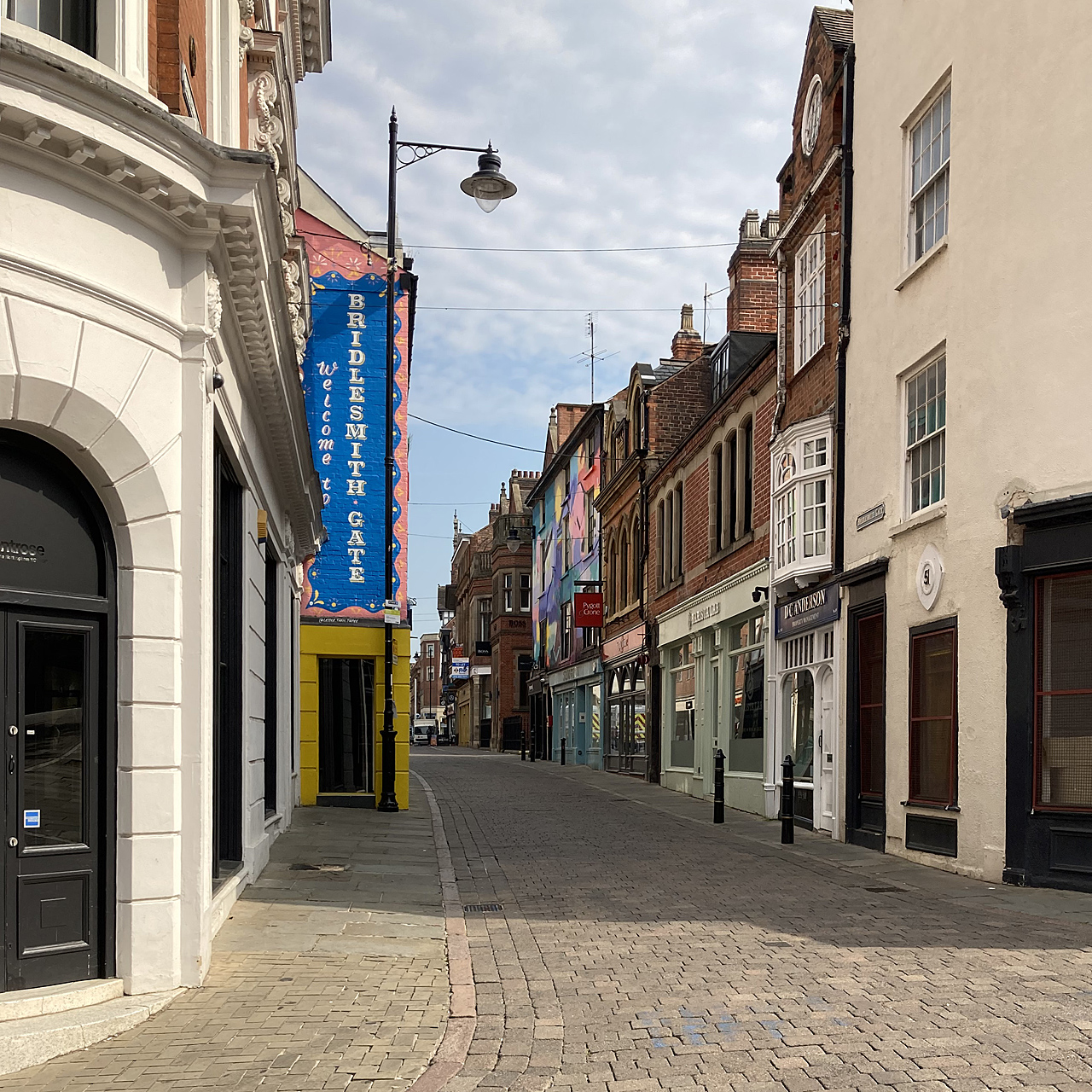
- June 2023

- Location within Nottingham
- Maintained by: Nottingham City Council
- Coordinates: 52.9521°N 1.1472°W

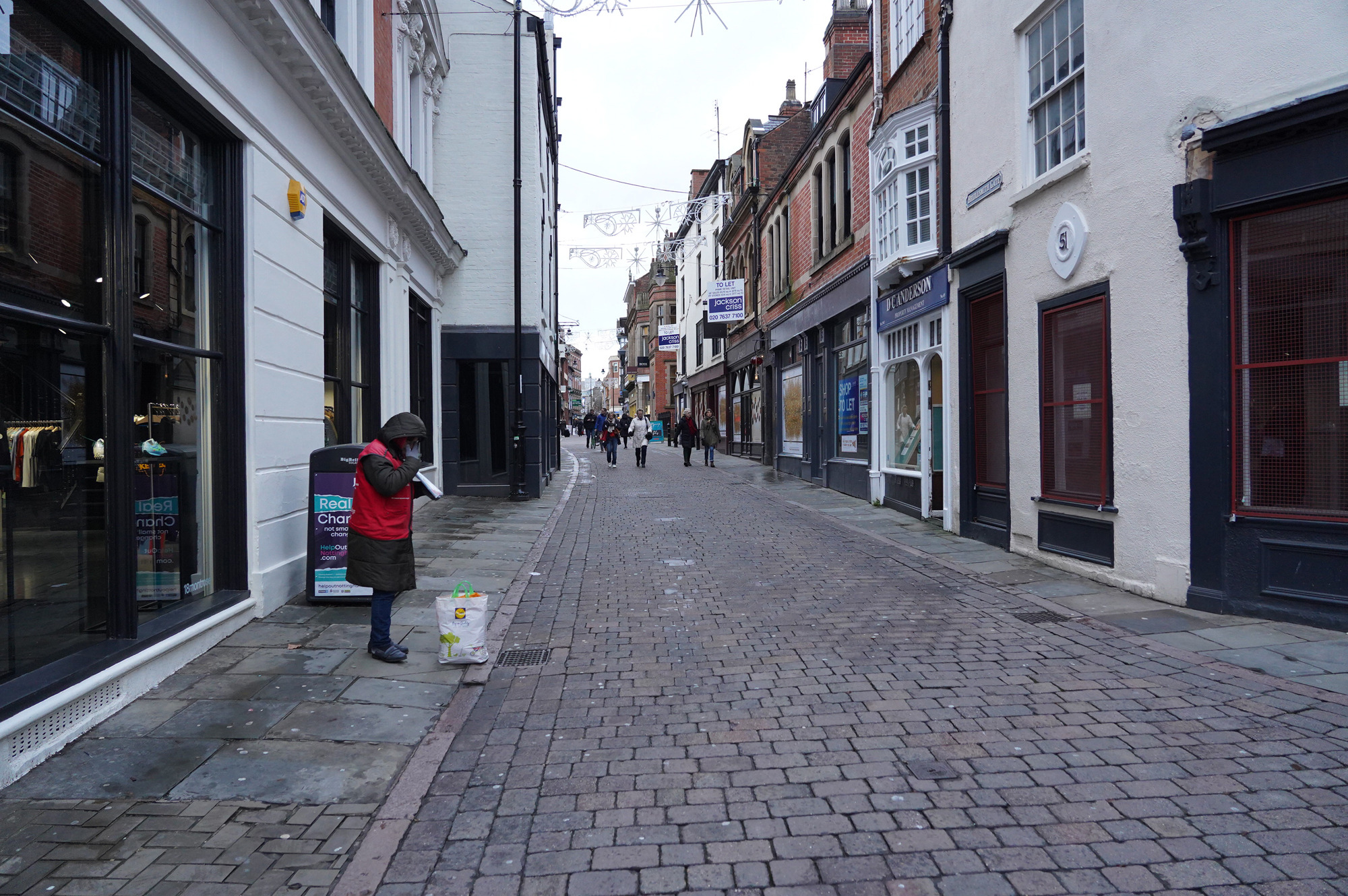
December 2019

Bridlesmith Gate is a pedestrianised shopping street in the city centre of Nottingham, England. It is located between Middle Pavement and Victoria Street. St. Peter's Gate and Bottle Lane stem off it along with Byard Lane.

Bridlesmith Gate houses many designer stores such as Reiss, Ted Baker, Flannels and Kurt Geiger.

== History ==
Bridlesmith Gate has existed since the Middle Ages. Until the 19th century it was the main shopping street in Nottingham, and formed part of a London to Leeds coach route. In 1819, the street was re-paved and gas lighting was installed by the Nottingham Gas Light and Coke Company. It was renamed Bond Street, after the street of the same name in London which was just becoming fashionable, however the name change was soon abandoned.

The northern end was completely re-constructed and widened in 1852 and most of the street was pedestrianised in 1973.

== Notable buildings ==
=== West side ===
- 4. (also 13 Poultry) Italian Renaissance in red brick with ashlar dressings and hipped slate roof by Francis Williamson 1875–76. Grade II listed.
- 6. Dog and Bear pub, 1874-76 by John Collyer. Described by Pevsner as fancifully ignorant with Bacchanalian masks and ornate capitals to the rusticated ground floor, and the upper floors rock faced, with the Italiante two-light windows going all queer with wavy hoodmoulds. Pub closed in 1993 and converted to shops.
- Corner of St Peter's Gate, No 21 St Peter's Gate by William Arthur Heazell 1895-96
- Rutland Chambers by Lawrence Bright 1888.
- 24 Shops timber framed.
- 26-28 Shop (Ted Baker in 2016)
- 30 Shop (ECCO in 2016) by Arthur Richard Calvert 1906-07
- 32 Shop (Links in 2016)
- 34-44 Bridlesmith House
- 46 American Apparel
- 48-50 Built as two houses, now shops and offices (Fred Perry in 2016). Early 18th century with alterations in 19th century and restoration in 20th century. Tie plates dated 1842. Red brick. Grade II listed.
- 52 House c. 1700 (MAC in 2016)
- 54-56 Early 16th and 17th century, refronted in early 19th century and altered in 20th century. Grade II listed.
- 58 Shop of 1859 with northern facsimile bay dating from 1909. Grade II listed.

=== East side ===
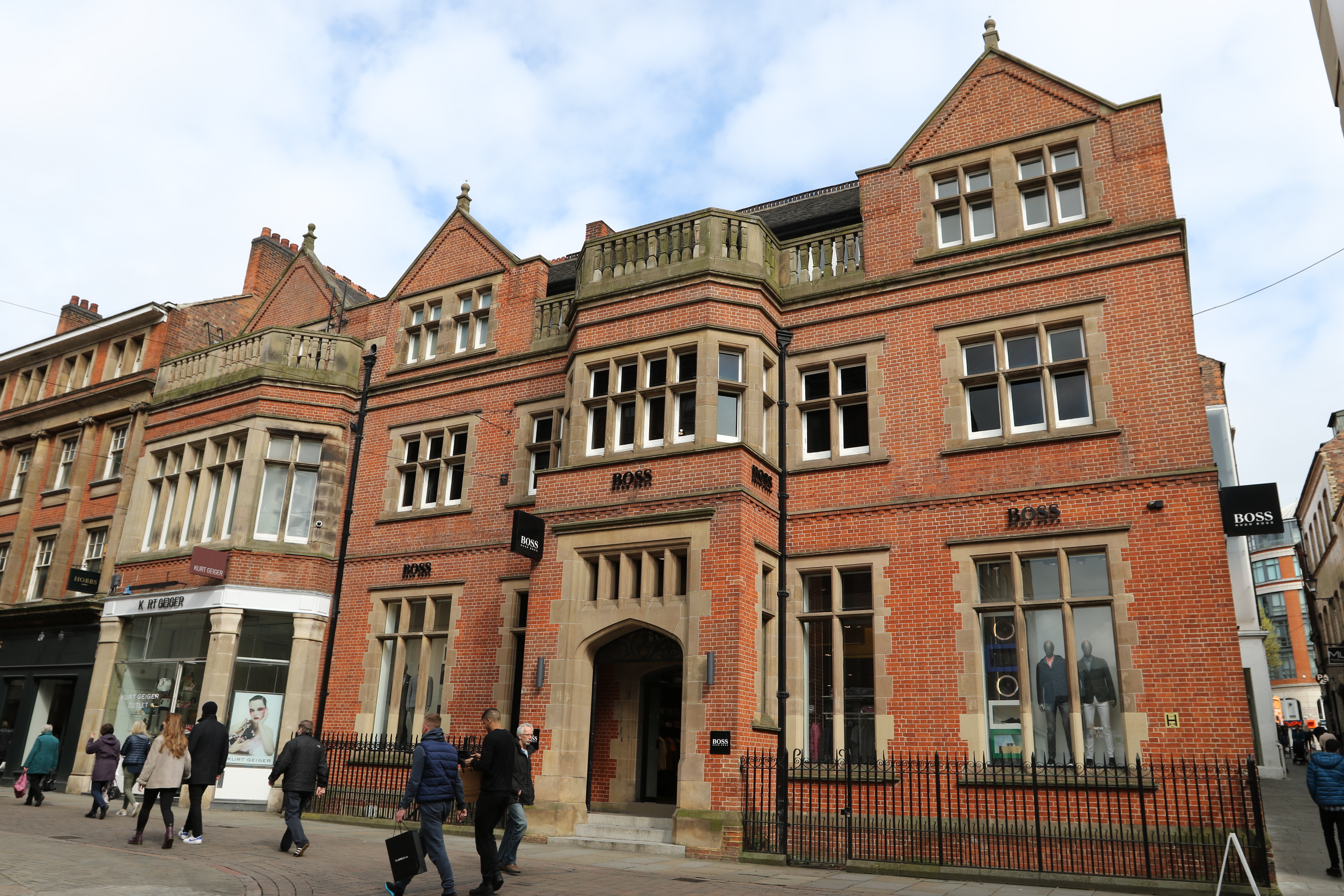
Hart, Fellow's and Company

- 1-3. Shops and offices for T.G. and L Brewitt (now Waterstones) by Lawrence Bright 1873–75.Grade II listed. South bay added by Albert Nelson Bromley in 1927 for Smart and Brown. Rear extension added 1999-2000 by Mark Stewart Architecture.
- 5-9 Shops by Gilbert Smith Doughty 1895.
- 11. Early 16th century timber-framed building
- 13-15 Bridlesmith Walk, (formerly King John's Arcade), Samuel Dutton Walker and John Howitt 1882. The previous building was known as King John's Palace with the timber built structure known as Rose-yard. The upper rooms were all wainscotted with oak panelling.
- 17 Ashbourne Chambers, John Lamb 1911 (Timber fronted shop Ashbourne Cafe and upstairs offices. Jack Wills in 2016)
- 19 Shops by Harry Allcock 1907 (Caffe Nero in 2016)
- 23 Two shops (Cath Kidston in 2016) by F.J. Architects 2000
- 25 Morris and Place's Auction Mart established in 1865 (Hobbs in 2016, Joules in 2017) by Arthur Richard Calvert 1900
- 31 Hart, Fellow's and Company Bank (later Cafe Rouge, now Boss in 2016) by Evans and Jolley 1884
- 32-36 Coco Tang cocktail bar and cafe
- 37 Shop (Argento in 2016). From 1886 the New Tram Cafe.
- 39-41 Shops (Tokenhouse in 2016)
- 43 Bakery by William Dymock Pratt 1890. Later Tyler and Sons Pork Butchers. Jones bootmakers in 2017.
- 45 Shop (Dune in 2016) by William Arthur Heazell and Son 1896
- 49 Shop (Anderson in 2016) by Sidney R. Stevenson 1897-98
- 51 House (Moda in Pelle in 2016), mid 19th century house

== Retailers ==
Some retailers located on/around Bridlesmith Gate:

- American Apparel
- Argento
- The Body Shop
- Coast
- Comptoir des Cotonniers
- Cruise
- Diesel S.p.A.
- Dune
- Ecco
- G-Star RAW
- Jack Wills
- Flannels
- French Connection
- Fred Perry
- Hobbs
- Hugo Boss
- Jigsaw
- Lacoste
- Muji
- Kurt Geiger
- Moda in Pelle
- Molton Brown
- Office
- Paul Smith (Willoughby House and Byard Lane)
- Reiss
- Ted Baker
- The Tokenhouse
- T. M. Lewin
- Waterstone's
- Whistles
- White Stuff
- Whittard of Chelsea

Some cafes, bars and restaurants located on/near Bridlesmith Gate:

- Caffè Nero
- Café Rouge
- CKs
- Dogma
- Fashion
- Jamie's Italian
- Pretty Orchid
