= Tennyson Street Methodist Church, Nottingham =

- Tennyson Street Methodist Church, Nottingham
- 52°57′36.7″N 1°9′50.1″W
- Location: Nottingham
- Country: England
- Denomination: Wesleyan Methodist

Architecture
- Architect: John Collyer
- Style: Italianate
- Groundbreaking: 16 June 1873
- Completed: 1 September 1874
- Construction cost: £6,000 (equivalent to £586,600 in 2025)
- Closed: 9 February 1941

Tennyson Street Methodist Church was a Methodist church at the junction of Tennyson Street and Larkdale Street, Nottingham from 1874 until 1941.

== History ==
The church was founded by members of Halifax Place Wesleyan Chapel to provide for the growing population of the Radford area.

The four foundation stones were laid on 16 June 1873 by William Foster, Esq., Mayor of Nottingham, W.D. Hoyle, Esq. of Nottingham, J.B. Reynolds Esq. of London and Joseph Ryder of Cambridge. The architect chosen was John Collyer of Nottingham and the contractor was Henry Vickers of Wilford Road, Nottingham. The style chosen was ‘modern Italian’ with the outer walls of the sub-story being built of rock-faced Bulwell stone, and the remainder of pressed bricks with Hollington stone dressings. The front was divided into centre and side wings, with the central door containing three entrances approached from a flight of steps. The doorways had polished marble columns with enriched caps.

The building opened for worship on 1 September 1874 The sub story contained a schoolroom 58ft 4 inches by 35 ft and a band room 25 ft by 20 ft. The internal dimensions of the chapel were 100 ft by 59 ft. Accommodation was provided for 1,000 worshippers, with 800 on the ground and 200 in a gallery. The ceiling of the chapel had ornamental cornice, with moulded and enriched panels. The total cost of construction was over £6,000.

In 1941 the Nottingham Education Committee purchased the building for £1,100 to use as a gymnasium and youth centre for Windley School. The interior fittings were sold off and the hand-blown pipe organ by Conacher was purchased for £40 for Cotmanhay Methodist Church.
