= The Park Estate =

Coordinates: 52.951°N 1.165°W

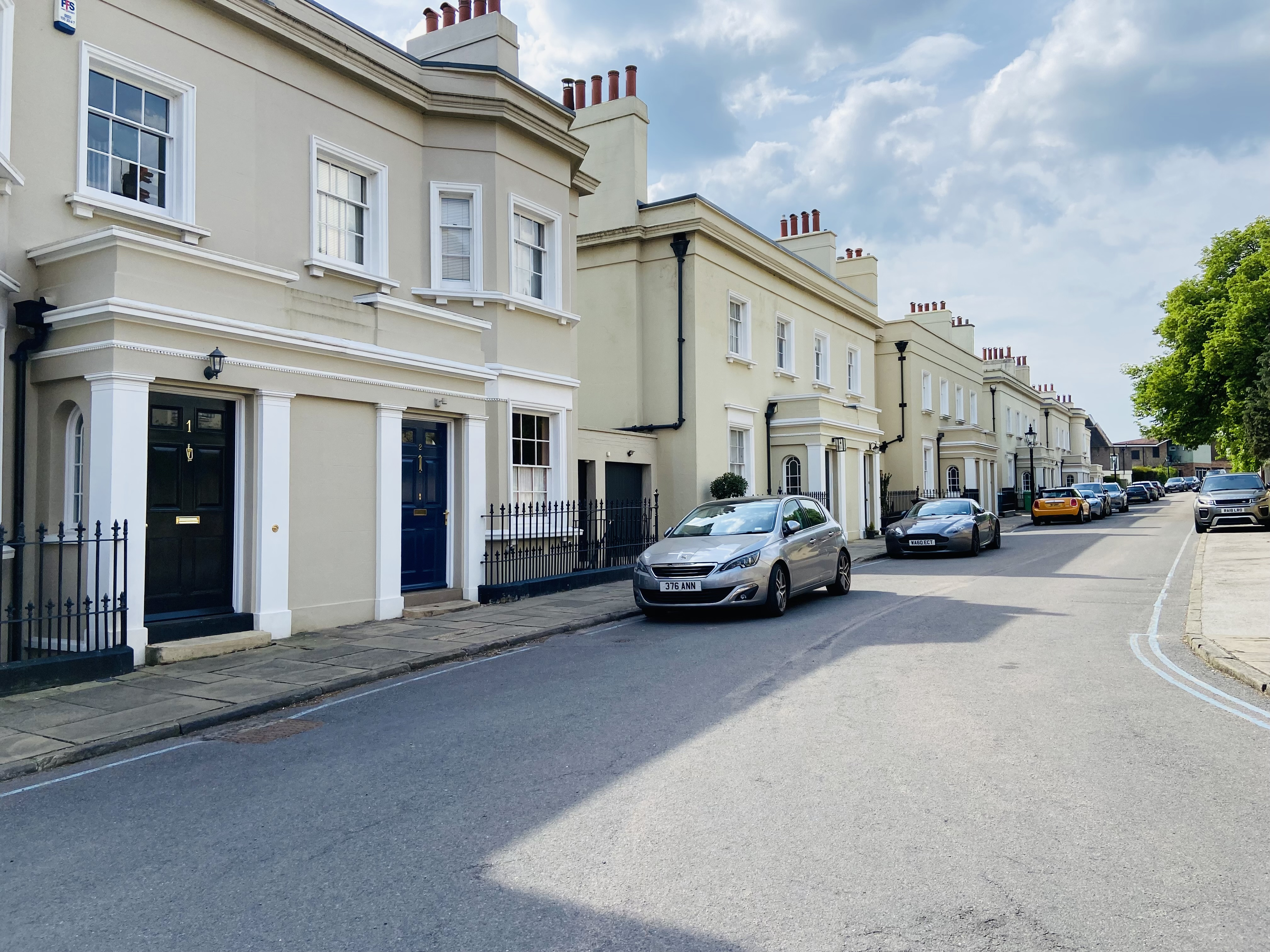
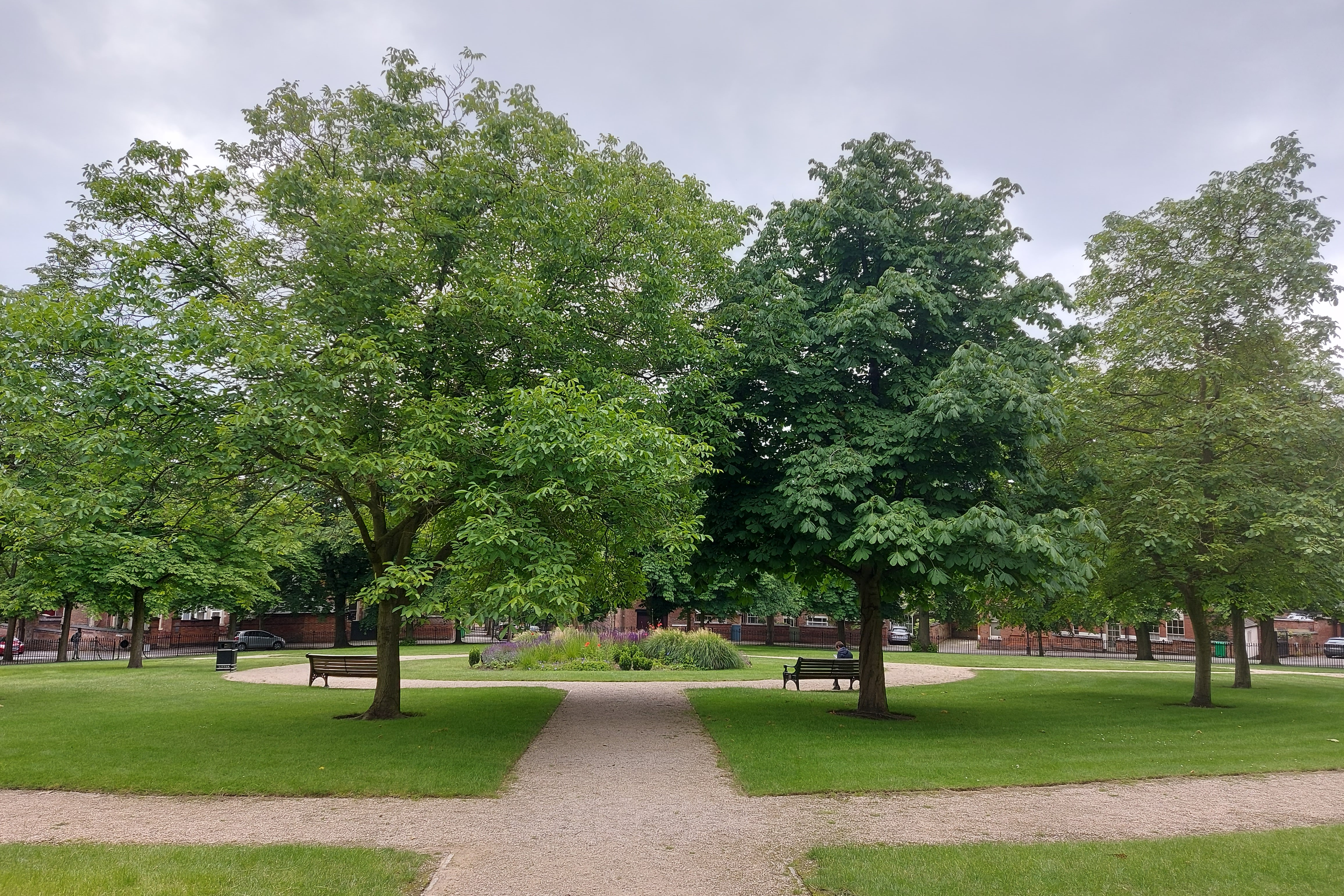
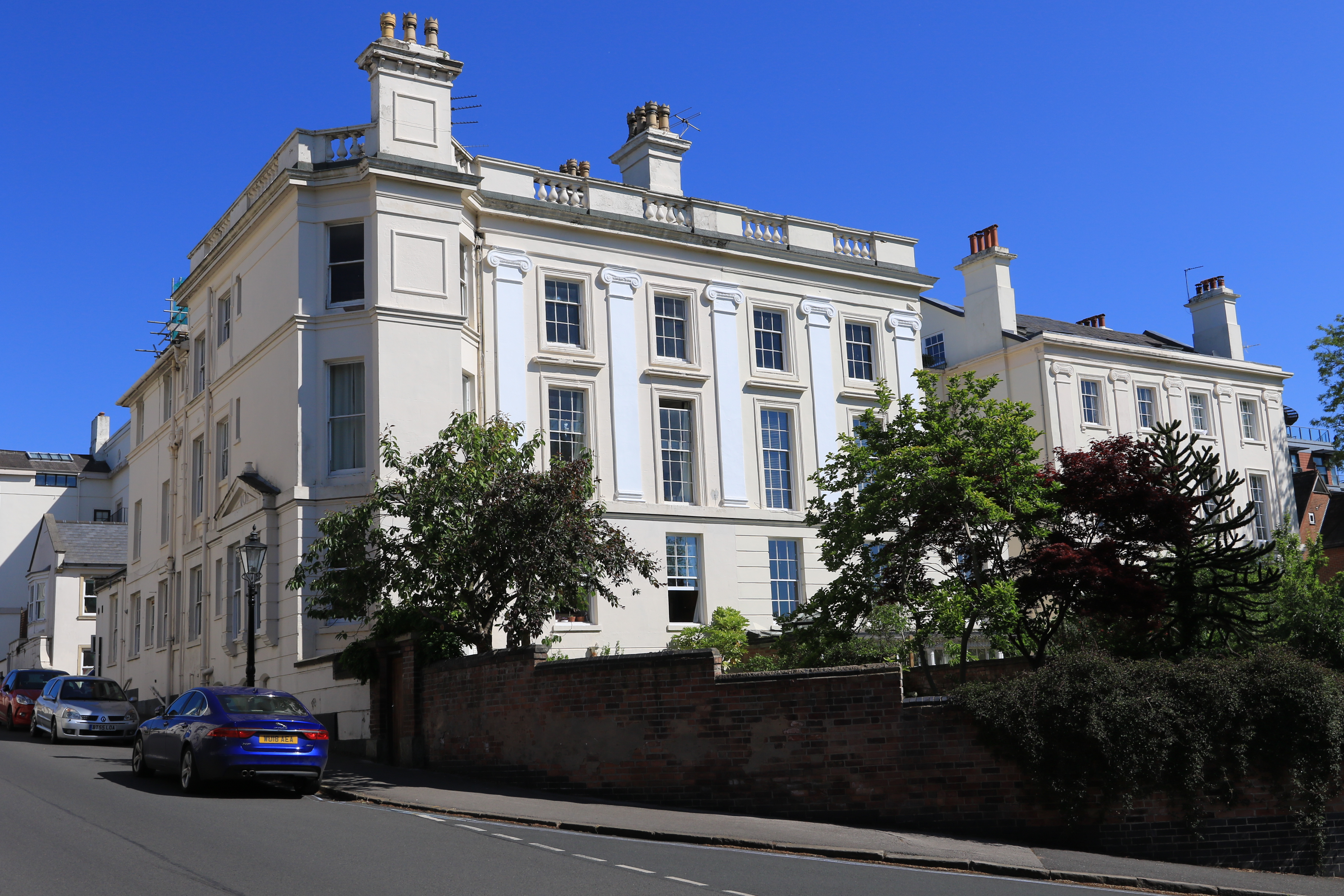
- Park Terrace Newcastle Circus Western Terrace

- Location within Nottinghamshire
- Population: 2,272
- OS grid reference: SK 56094 39652
- Unitary authority: Nottingham
- Ceremonial county: Nottinghamshire
- Region: East Midlands
- Country: England
- Sovereign state: United Kingdom
- Post town: Nottingham
- Postcode district: NG7
- Dialling code: 0115
- Police: Nottinghamshire
- Fire: Nottinghamshire
- Ambulance: East Midlands
- UK Parliament: Nottingham South
- Website: https://nottinghamparkestate.co.uk/

The Park Estate is a private residential housing estate to the west of Nottingham city centre, England. It is noted for its Victorian architecture, although many of the houses have been altered, extended or converted into flats. The estate uses gas street lighting, which is believed to be one of the largest networks in Europe.

== History ==
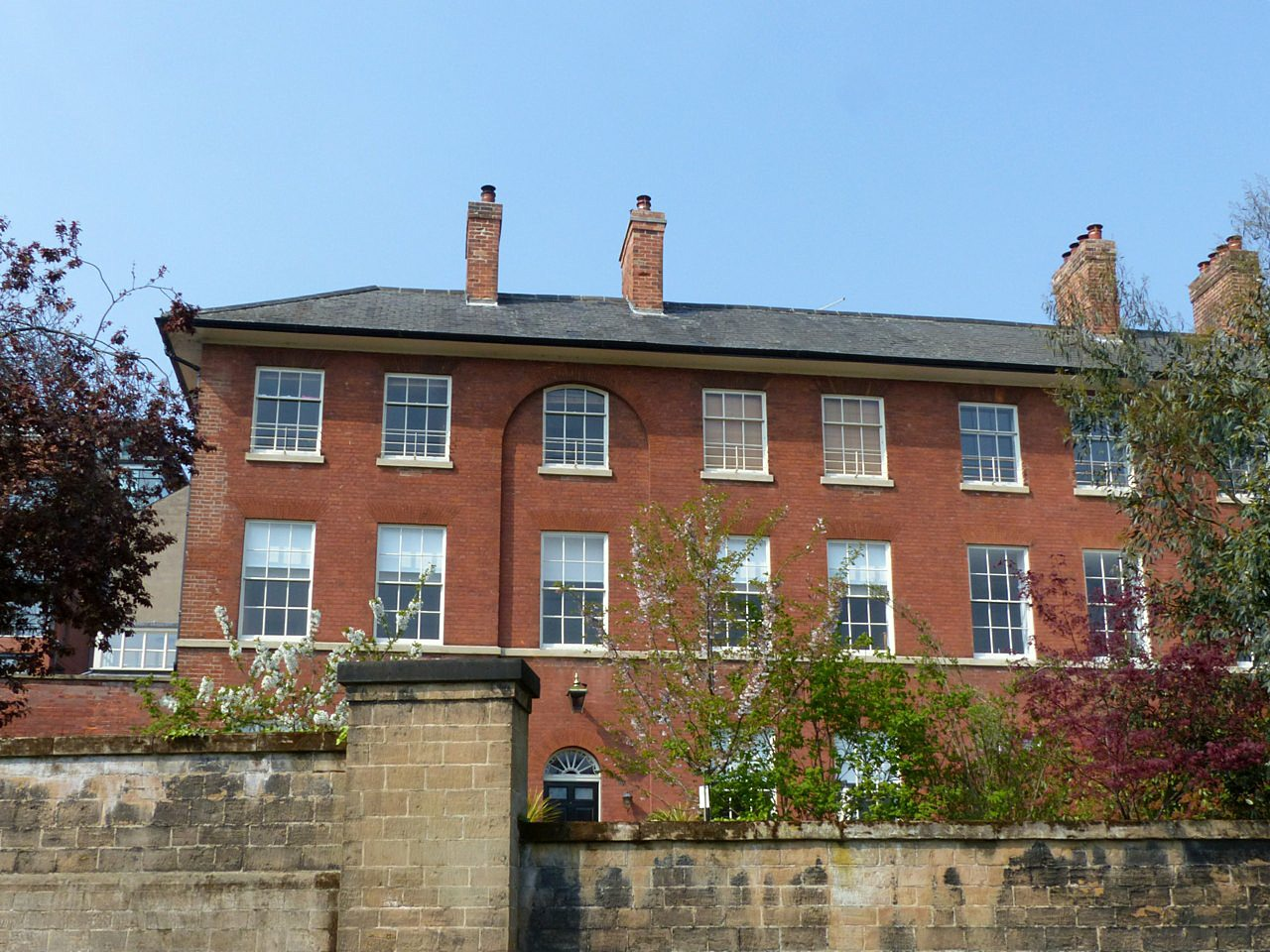
St Peter's Rectory

The Park Estate started life as a forested deer park situated immediately to the west of Nottingham Castle. The castle was, from its construction in 1087 until 1663, a royal castle, and the adjoining park a royal park. As well as deer, the park contained fish ponds and a rabbit warren, whilst King Henry II, who was reported to be 'addicted to hunting beyond measure', added a falconry. The park would have provided both food and sport for castle residents. After the capture of the castle by parliamentary forces during the English Civil War, the park's trees were felled to provide fuel and supplies to the garrison, and in 1651 the castle was slighted.

In 1663, the ruined castle and park were bought by William Cavendish, 1st Duke of Newcastle. He initially re-stocked the park with deer, but by the 1720s the area had been given over for cattle grazing. In 1800, whilst Henry Pelham-Clinton, 4th Duke of Newcastle was still a minor, his mother considered disposing of the park. Her agents advised against such a sale as they thought it would depress land values in Nottingham, and they recommended instead a gradual sale of small plots on the periphery of the park. The first domestic building in the park was built in 1809. Built opposite the castle gatehouse, the building served as the vicarage to St. Mary's Church.

With the industrialisation of Nottingham in the 19th century, the park became a valuable open space for local people. Notwithstanding this, and despite much opposition from locals who regarded the area as public land, major development began in 1822 under the 4th Duke. Initially he engaged the architect John Jephson, but in 1825 Jephson was replaced by Peter Frederick Robinson, who published a plan for the park in 1827. The first houses appeared on Park Terrace around 1829 and by 1832 some 40–50 had been completed. Despite this development, in 1849 The Stranger's Guide noted that the park was 'open to the public and is used as a promenade by all classes of society, and a most healthy appendage it is to a populous and closely built town'.

Development continued under the 5th Duke, who appointed architect Thomas Chambers Hine in 1854 to design many of the houses and by 1859 houses were complete on Castle Grove, Lenton Road, Newcastle Drive and Clinton Terrace. Hine remained as the architect to the estate, even after the death of the 5th Duke in 1864, when the estate was managed by a trust. Many of the large villas were built for local wealthy industrialists and businessmen, who employed their own architects. The designs for all houses still had to be approved by Hine until he retired in 1891. Hine was also responsible for the construction of the Park Tunnel, intended to provide access for horse-drawn carriages to Derby Road.

By 1918, the estate was largely completed with 355 houses. By the mid 1930s the larger houses were proving difficult to sell. Many of the remaining leases were very short. St Heliers, the former home of Jesse Boot, 1st Baron Trent, which had been unoccupied for 10 years, and was reported as being in good condition, was sold by auction by Walker, Walton and Hanson on 15 June 1932. Originally costing some £6,000, Herbert Weightman of Wilford, a jobbing builder, bought the property for £7 (equivalent to £422 in 2025). The ground rent payable to the Newcastle Estate Office was £116 per year (equivalent to £7,001 in 2025). There were understood to be covenants in place preventing its demolition, but it was pulled down in 1936.

In 1938, the 8th Duke sold the Park Estate to the Nuffield Trust who then sold it to Oxford University. Between 1940 and 1986 Oxford University sold the freeholds to the owners. The Park Estate was designated a conservation area in 1969. In 1986 negotiations between the Park Residents Association and Oxford University Chest resulted in the ownership of the Estate being transferred to the newly formed company: The Nottingham Park Estate Limited.

By 2007, all but about a dozen of the 355 original pre-1918 houses still existed, many without any significant external alterations.

== Architecture ==
Significant properties within the Park Estate.
Name	Street and number	Photograph	Date	Architect	Notes and refs.
	Castle Boulevard, 62		1895	Watson Fothergill	Grade II listed
	Castle Boulevard, 64		1895	Watson Fothergill	Grade II listed
Hine House	Castle Grove, 1	—	1856	Thomas Chambers Hine	Grade II listed
	Castle Grove, 2	—	1856	Thomas Chambers Hine	Grade II listed
	Castle Grove, 3	—	1856	Thomas Chambers Hine	Grade II listed
Barbican House	Castle Grove, 4	—	1856	Thomas Chambers Hine	
	Castle Grove, 5	—	1856	Thomas Chambers Hine	Grade II listed
	Castle Grove, 6	—			See Lenton Road, 1
	Castle Grove, 7		1856	Thomas Chambers Hine	Grade II listed
Hardwick House	Cavendish Crescent North	—			
Carisbrooke House	Cavendish Crescent North, 1	—	1870–75		
Cavendish Lodge	Cavendish Crescent North, 3		1870–75		
	Cavendish Crescent North, 5	—	1882		
Jardine House	Cavendish Crescent North, 7		1880–82		
Peverel Tower	Cavendish Crescent North, 9		1875	Thomas Chambers Hine	Grade II listed
	Cavendish Crescent North, 10		c.1880–1890		
Gleadthorpe	Cavendish Crescent North, 11	—	1890–95		
	Cavendish Crescent North, 12		c.1885		
Park House	Cavendish Crescent North, 14		1896		Grade II listed
	Cavendish Crescent North, 15	—	1885		Semi with 17
	Cavendish Crescent North, 16		c.1885		
	Cavendish Crescent North, 17	—	1885		Semi with 15
	Cavendish Crescent North, 18		c.1885		
	Cavendish Crescent North, 19	—	1882		
	Cavendish Crescent North, 20		c.1885		
	Cavendish Crescent North, 21	—			
	Cavendish Crescent North, 22	—	c.1885		
	Cavendish Crescent North, 23	—			
	Cavendish Crescent North, 24		c.1885		
Gladstone Court	Cavendish Crescent South, 1		1877	Thomas Chambers Hine	
Kirkstall Lodge	Cavendish Crescent South, 3	—	c1875	Thomas Chambers Hine?	
	Cavendish Crescent South, 5	—	c1875		
	Cavendish Crescent South, 7	—	c1875		
	Cavendish Crescent South, 9	—	c1875		
	Cavendish Crescent South, 11	—	c1875	Robert Evans JP	
William House	Cavendish Crescent South, 13	—			See South Road, 1
	Cavendish Crescent South, 15	—	1861	Thomas Chambers Hine	Alterations by Evans, Cartwright and Woollatt in 1960
	Cavendish Crescent South, 17	—	c1870		
Amelia House	Cavendish Crescent South, 19	—	1861	Thomas Chambers Hine	Built for Anthony Mundella
Albert Villa	Cavendish Crescent South, 21	—	1861	Thomas Chambers Hine	Lived in by Richard Allen (publisher) until his death in 1884
Holyrood House	Cavendish Crescent South, 23	—	1876		
Sutherland House	Cavendish Crescent South, 25		c1876		
Kingston House	Cavendish Crescent East, 23	—	c1890-95	Thomas Chambers Hine?	
Cavendish Court	Cavendish Road East, 25		1884–85	Thomas Chambers Hine	
Cavendish Cottage	Cavendish Road East, 25c	—			Arts and Crafts
Bishop's House	Cavendish Road East, 27		1883		From 1932, the home of the Roman Catholic Bishop of Nottingham.
Gartree	Cavendish Road East, 29		1884		
	Cavendish Road East, 31		1884		
Redcliffe	Cavendish Road East, 33		1897–98	Stockdale Harrison	For Frank Woodward, Lace Manufacturer
Cavendish House	Cavendish Road East, 37	—	1881	Thomas Chambers Hine	
Overdale	Cavendish Road East, 39		1883	Thomas Chambers Hine	
Elmhurst	Cavendish Road East, 41		1883	Thomas Chambers Hine	
Ashley House	Cavendish Road East, 45	—	1877	Samuel Dutton Walker	
	Clare Valley, 1	—	c1890		
	Clare Valley, 2	—	c1890		
	Clare Valley, 3	—	c1890		
	Clare Valley, 4	—	c1890		
	Clare Valley, 5	—	c1890		
Terrace House	Clifton Terrace	—	1855	Thomas Chambers Hine	
	Clifton Terrace, 1	—	1851	Thomas Chambers Hine	
	Clifton Terrace, 3	—			
Iveston House	Clifton Terrace, 4		1880s		
	Clumber Crescent North, 3	—			
	Clumber Crescent North, 5	—			
	Clumber Crescent North, 7	—			See North Road, 7
Clumber House	Clumber Crescent North	—			
	Clumber Crescent South, 5				
	Clumber Crescent South, 7				
Westwood	Clumber Road East, 3		1910	Ernest A Sudbury	Previously called Cuylerholme.
Hillside	Clumber Road East, 5		1904	E.M. Lacey.	Now Northwood and Southwood
Adam House	Clumber Road East, 7		1885	Arthur George Marshall	Originally named Brightlands Built for Samuel Bourne.
Edale House	Clumber Road East, 9		1883	Thomas Chambers Hine	
Penrhyn House	Clumber Road East, 11		1879	Thomas Chambers Hine	
Stowe House	Clumber Road West, 6				
Holly Lodge	Clumber Road West				
Linden House	Clumber Road West		1875	Thomas Chambers Hine	
	Duke William Mount, 1		1875	Thomas Chambers Hine	For Horace Arthur Fisher, Lace Manufacturer
Selsoe	Duke William Mount, 2	—	1887	Thomas Chambers Hine	
	Duke William Mount, 3	—	1887	Thomas Chambers Hine	
	Fishpond Drive, 4		c1888-90		
	Fishpond Drive, 6		c1888-90		
	Fishpond Drive, 30	—			
	Fishpond Drive, 32	—			
	Hamilton Drive, 1	—	c1886-90		
	Hamilton Drive, 2	—	c1886-88		
	Hamilton Drive, 3	—	c1886-88		
	Hamilton Drive, 4	—	c1886-88		
	Hamilton Drive, 5	—	c1886-88		
	Hamilton Drive, 6	—	c1886-88		
	Hamilton Drive, 7	—	c1886-88		
	Hamilton Drive, 8	—	c1886-88		
	Hamilton Drive, 9	—	c1886-88		
	Hamilton Drive, 10	—	c1886-88		
	Hamilton Drive, 11	—	c1886-88		
	Hamilton Drive, 24	—	c1890		
	Holles Crescent, 1	—	c1865-70	Thomas Chambers Hine?	
	Holles Crescent, 3	—	c1865-70	Thomas Chambers Hine?	
	Holles Crescent, 5	—	c1865-70	Thomas Chambers Hine?	
	Hope Drive, 1	—	1880s	Thomas Chambers Hine	Coach House
	Hope Drive, 2		1888–89	Attributed to Watson Fothergill	
	Hope Drive, 4		1888–89	Attributed to Watson Fothergill	
	Hope Drive, 5		1888–89	Attributed to Watson Fothergill	
	Hope Drive, 6		1888–89	Attributed to Watson Fothergill	
	Hope Drive, 7	—	1888–89	Attributed to Watson Fothergill	
	Hope Drive, 8		1888–89	Attributed to Watson Fothergill	
	Hope Drive, 9	—	1888–89	Attributed to Watson Fothergill	
	Hope Drive, 11	—	1888–89	Attributed to Watson Fothergill	
	Hope Drive, 12		c1888-90		
	Hope Drive, 13	—	1888–89	Attributed to Watson Fothergill	
	Hope Drive, 14		c1888-90		
	Hope Drive, 16		c1888-90		
	Hope Drive, 18		c1888-90		
	Hope Drive, 20	—	c1888-90		
	Hope Drive, 22	—	c1888-90		
	Hope Drive, 24	—	c1888-90		
	Hope Drive, 26	—	c1888-90		
Barton House	Huntingdon Drive, 1	—	c1908	Lawrence Bright	
	Huntingdon Drive, 2	—	c1908	Lawrence Bright	
	Huntingdon Drive, 3		1889	Watson Fothergill	Grade II listed
	Huntingdon Drive, 4	—	1889	Watson Fothergill	Grade II listed
	Huntingdon Drive, 5	—	c1906-8	Lawrence Bright	
	Huntingdon Drive, 6	—	c1906-8	Lawrence Bright	
	Huntingdon Drive, 7	—	c1906-8	Lawrence Bright	
	Huntingdon Drive, 8	—	c1906-8	Lawrence Bright	
	Huntingdon Drive, 9	—	c1906-8	Lawrence Bright	
	Huntingdon Drive, 10	—	c1906-8	Lawrence Bright	
Iveston	Kenilworth Road, 1	—	c1888		
Yew Tree House	Kenilworth Road, 2	—	1871	Thomas Chambers Hine	
Kenilworth House	Kenilworth Road, 3	—	c1888		
The Chestnuts	Kenilworth Road, 5	—	c1865-70	Thomas Chambers Hine?	
	Lenton Avenue, 1		c1870-75		
Cedar House	Lenton Avenue, 3		c1865-75		
	Lenton Avenue, 5		c1865-75		
	Lenton Avenue, 7		c1870		
	Lenton Avenue, 9		1870–75	Thomas Chambers Hine?	
Lenton View	Lenton Avenue, 11a		c1875	Julian Marsh	
	Lenton Avenue, 13	—	c1880	Thomas Chambers Hine?	
	Lenton Avenue, 15	—	c1880	Thomas Chambers Hine?	
Dundee House	Lenton Avenue, 17	—	c1885	Thomas Chambers Hine?	
	Lenton Avenue, 19		c1878-80		
	Lenton Avenue, 21	—	c1878-80		
	Lenton Avenue, 23	—	c1870		
Arlington House	Lenton Avenue, 25	—	c1875		
	Lenton Avenue, 27	—	c1882-83	Thomas Chambers Hine?	
	Lenton Avenue,29	—	c1882-83	Thomas Chambers Hine?	
Graylands	Lenton Avenue, 31	—	c1875	Thomas Chambers Hine?	
Newlands	Lenton Avenue, 33	—	c1875	Thomas Chambers Hine?	
	Lenton Road, 1	—	1855	Thomas Chambers Hine	Grade II listed
Castle Rising	Lenton Road, 3	—	1855	Thomas Chambers Hine	Grade II listed
Castle Bank	Lenton Road, 5 and 5A		1873	Watson Fothergill	Grade II listed
Fothergill House	Lenton Road, 7		1872	Watson Fothergill	Grade II listed
Estate Office	Lenton Road, 7a		1909	Arthur Richard Calvert	Grade II listed
	Lenton Road, 11	—		Robert Evans JP	Home of Ernest Reginald Ridgway architect until 1917.
Fairholme	Lenton Road, 13		1861	Thomas Chambers Hine	
	Lenton Road, 15		1861	Thomas Chambers Hine	
Oakhyrst	Lenton Road, 17		1861	Thomas Chambers Hine	
	Lenton Road, 19		1861	Thomas Chambers Hine	
Ravine House	Lenton Road, 21		1861	Thomas Chambers Hine	
Rutland House	Lenton Road, 23		1861	Thomas Chambers Hine	
	Lenton Road, 25		1858	Thomas Chambers Hine	
Lenton House	Lenton Road, 27		1858	Thomas Chambers Hine	
	Lenton Road, 29		1858	Thomas Chambers Hine	
Leslie Villa	Lenton Road, 31		1858	Thomas Chambers Hine	
Cliff House	Lenton Road, 33		1858	Thomas Chambers Hine	
Gladstone House	Lincoln Circus		1876–77	Edwin Loverseed	
	Newcastle Circus, 2	—	1870–75		
Mevell House	Newcastle Circus, 7	—	1877	Thomas Chambers Hine	Grade II listed
Newcastle Court	Newcastle Circus			Thomas Chambers Hine	
Burton House	Newcastle Circus		1875		
Castlethorpe	Newcastle Circus		1875		
	Newcastle Drive, 1	—	1856–59	Thomas Chambers Hine	
	Newcastle Drive, 3	—	1856-59	Thomas Chambers Hine	
	Newcastle Drive, 5	—	1856-59	Thomas Chambers Hine	
	Newcastle Drive, 7	—	1856–59	Thomas Chambers Hine	
	Newcastle Drive, 9	—	1856–59	Thomas Chambers Hine	
	Newcastle Drive, 11	—	1856–59	Thomas Chambers Hine	
	Newcastle Drive, 13	—	1856–59	Thomas Chambers Hine	
	Newcastle Drive, 15	—	1878	Albert Nelson Bromley	Lived in by the architect until his death in 1934
	Newcastle Drive, 17	—	1878	Albert Nelson Bromley	
	Newcastle Drive, 19	—	1886		
	Newcastle Drive, 21	—	1884	Albert Nelson Bromley	
	Newcastle Drive, 23	—	1884	Albert Nelson Bromley	
Glendower	Newcastle Drive, 27		1884–85		For William Foster
	Newcastle Drive, 29	—	1856–59	Thomas Chambers Hine	
	Newcastle Drive, 31	—	1856–59	Thomas Chambers Hine	
	Newcastle Drive, 33	—	1856–59	Thomas Chambers Hine	
	Newcastle Drive, 35	—			Home of Capt. Athelstan Popkess Chief Constable of Nottingham City Police between 1930 and 1959.
	Newcastle Drive, 37	—			
Walton House	Newcastle Drive, 39		1886	Watson Fothergill	Grade II listed Also known as The Priest's House
	North Road, 1	—			
	North Road, 2	—			
	North Road, 3	—			
	North Road, 5	—			
Yorke House	North Road, 6		1870–80		
Claremont	North Road, 7		1872	Thomas Chambers Hine	Built for George Sparrow.
	North Road, 8	—			
East Lodge	Park Row	—	1860?	Thomas Chambers Hine	Grade II listed
Tower House	Park Row, 53		1827–33	Peter Frederick Robinson then Watson Fothergill	Grade II listed tower added by Watson Fothergill after 1894.
	Park Ravine, 2				
	Park Terrace, 1		1827–33	Peter Frederick Robinson	Grade II listed
	Park Terrace, 2	—	1827–33	Peter Frederick Robinson	Grade II listed
	Park Terrace, 3	—	1827–33	Peter Frederick Robinson	Grade II listed
	Park Terrace, 4	—	1827–33	Peter Frederick Robinson	Grade II listed
	Park Terrace, 5	—	1827–33	Peter Frederick Robinson	Grade II listed
	Park Terrace, 6	—	1827–33	Peter Frederick Robinson	Grade II listed
	Park Terrace, 7	—	1827–33	Peter Frederick Robinson	Grade II listed
	Park Terrace, 8	—	1827–33	Peter Frederick Robinson	Grade II listed
	Park Terrace, 9	—	1827–33	Peter Frederick Robinson	Grade II listed
	Park Terrace, 10	—	1827–33	Peter Frederick Robinson	Grade II listed
	Park Terrace, 11	—	1827–33	Peter Frederick Robinson	Grade II listed
	Park Terrace, 12	—	1827–33	Peter Frederick Robinson	Grade II listed
	Park Terrace, 14	—			
	Park Terrace, 15	—	1827–33	Peter Frederick Robinson	Grade II listed
	Park Terrace, 16	—	1827–33	Peter Frederick Robinson	Grade II listed
	Park Terrace, 17	—	1827–33	Peter Frederick Robinson	Grade II listed
	Park Terrace, 18	—	1881	Thomas Chambers Hine	See Park Terrace, 19
	Park Terrace, 19	—	1881	Thomas Chambers Hine	Grade II listed Originally one house, now numbers 18, 19 and 20.
	Park Terrace, 20	—	1881	Thomas Chambers Hine	See Park Terrace, 19
Arundel House	Park Valley, 1		c1870	Thomas Chambers Hine	For Stephen Wills, Lace Manufacturer
	Park Valley, 3	—	c1870	Thomas Chambers Hine	
Hollyhurst	Park Valley, 4		c1835-45		
	Park Valley, 5	—	c1845-50	Thomas Chambers Hine	
Stuart Cottage	Park Valley, 6	—	c1835-45		
	Park Valley, 7	—	1848–51	Thomas Chambers Hine	Grade II listed
	Park Valley, 8	—	1828–29	Peter Frederick Robinson	Grade II listed
	Park Valley, 9	—	c1845-50	Thomas Chambers Hine	
	Park Valley, 10		1828–29	Peter Frederick Robinson	Grade II listed
	Park Valley, 11	—	c1845	Thomas Chambers Hine	
	Park Valley, 13	—			
	Park Valley, 15	—	1838–39	Peter Frederick Robinson	Grade II listed
	Park Valley, 17	—	1838–39	Peter Frederick Robinson	Grade II listed
	Park Valley, 19	—	1838–39	Peter Frederick Robinson	Grade II listed
	Park Valley, 21	—	1838–39	Peter Frederick Robinson	Grade II listed
	Park Valley, 23	—	1838–39	Peter Frederick Robinson	Grade II listed
	Park Valley, 25	—	1878	Thomas Chambers Hine	Grade II listed
	Pelham Crescent, 1	—	c1870	John Loverseed	
	Pelham Crescent, 3	—	c1868-72	John Loverseed	
	Pelham Crescent, 5	—	c1868-72	John Loverseed	
	Pelham Crescent, 7	—	c1868-70	John Loverseed	
	Pelham Crescent, 9	—	c1868-70	John Loverseed	
	Pelham Crescent, 10	—	c1870-75	John Loverseed	
	Pelham Crescent, 11	—	c1868-70	John Loverseed	
	Pelham Crescent, 12	—	c1870-75	John Loverseed	
	Pelham Crescent, 13	—	c1868-70	John Loverseed	
	Pelham Crescent, 14	—	c1870-75	John Loverseed	
	Pelham Crescent, 15	—	c1871	John Loverseed	
	Pelham Crescent, 16	—	c1870-75	John Loverseed	
	Pelham Crescent, 17	—	c1871	John Loverseed	
	Pelham Crescent, 18	—	c1911		
	Pelham Crescent, 19	—	c1868-70	John Loverseed	
	Peveril Drive, 1	—			
	Peveril Drive, 2	—			
	Peveril Drive, 3	—			
	Peveril Drive, 6	—			
	Peveril Drive, 7	—			
	Peveril Drive, 8	—			
	Peveril Drive, 10	—			
	Peveril Drive, 11	—			
	Peveril Drive, 12	—			
Dudley Lodge	Peveril Drive		c1889		
Peveril House	Peveril Drive	—			
	The Ropewalk, 2	—			
	The Ropewalk, 4	—			
	The Ropewalk, 6	—			
	The Ropewalk, 8	—			
	The Ropewalk, 10	—			
	The Ropewalk, 11	—	1850	Thomas Chambers Hine	
	The Ropewalk, 12	—			
	The Ropewalk, 14	—			
	The Ropewalk, 16	—			
	The Ropewalk, 20	—			
	The Ropewalk,22	—			
The Townhouse	The Ropewalk, 24				
	The Ropewalk, 26	—			
	The Ropewalk, 28				
	The Ropewalk, 30	—			
Oak Hill House	The Ropewalk, 32		1827–37	Grade II listed	For Thomas Herbert, lace manufacturer
	The Ropewalk, 34	—	1827–37		Grade II listed
	The Ropewalk, 36	—	1827–37		Grade II listed
	The Ropewalk, 38		1827–37		Grade II listed
	The Ropewalk, 40	—	1827–37		Grade II listed
	The Ropewalk, 42	—			
	The Ropewalk, 44	—			
	The Ropewalk, 46	—			
	The Ropewalk, 48	—			
	The Ropewalk, 50	—			
	The Ropewalk, 52	—			
	The Ropewalk, 54	—			
	The Ropewalk, 56	—			
William House	South Road, 1	—	1858	Thomas Chambers Hine	Grade II listed
	South Road, 2	—		Thomas Chambers Hine	
Ellenborough House	South Road, 3		1850s	Extended and remodelled by Watson Fothergill	Grade II listed Remodelled 1890 and 1897.
	South Road, 4			Thomas Chambers Hine	
	South Road, 5	—		Thomas Chambers Hine	
	South Road, 6			Thomas Chambers Hine	
	Tattershall Drive, 1	—	c1875		
	Tattershall Drive, 2	—	c1875		
	Tattershall Drive, 3	—	c1873		
St Ives	Tattershall Drive, 4	—	c1890		
	Tattershall Drive, 5	—	c1895		
	Tattershall Drive, 6	—	c1890		
Broadgate	Western Terrace, 1	—	ca. 1895		
	Western Terrace, 2	—	1890		
	Western Terrace, 3		1845–50	Thomas Chambers Hine	Grade II listed
	Western Terrace, 4		1845–50	Thomas Chambers Hine	Grade II listed
	Western Terrace, 5		1845–50	Thomas Chambers Hine	Grade II listed
	Western Terrace, 6		1845–50	Thomas Chambers Hine	Grade II listed
	Western Terrace, 7	—	1844	Thomas Chambers Hine	
	Western Terrace, 8	—	1844	Thomas Chambers Hine	Grade II listed
	Western Terrace, 9	—	1844	Thomas Chambers Hine	Grade II listed
	Western Terrace, 10	—	1844	Thomas Chambers Hine	Grade II listed
Lincoln Villa	Western Terrace, 11	—	1840	Peter Frederick Robinson	

=== Planning constraints ===
The Park Estate is a conservation area with many of the buildings being listed. Planning submissions are subject to detailed planning regulations.

== Residential estate ==
=== Access ===
Access to the estate for vehicles is restricted to three entrances – North Road (off Derby Road), Lenton Road (next to castle) and Peveril Drive (off Castle Boulevard) where registration with the estate's ANPR system is required to operate the rising bollards. There are also two minor entrances – Barrack Lane (off Derby Road) and Newcastle Drive/Park Row (off The Ropewalk) – that provide access to selected parts of the estate, although Barrack Lane itself does not fall within the Park Estate.

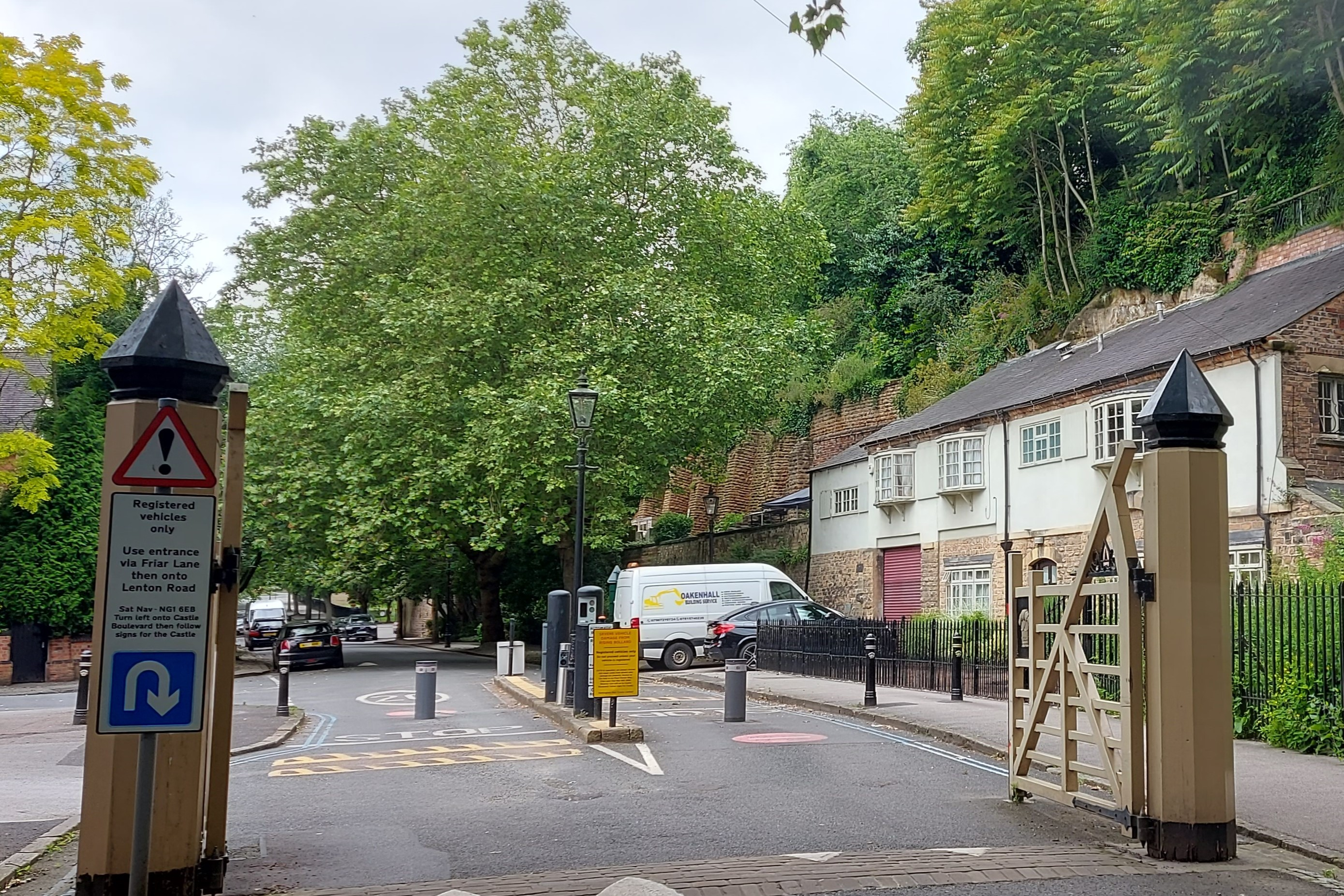
Entrance to the Park Estate

There are several pedestrian/cycle entrances which are mostly gated, some of which are locked at night. These are: Lenton Road (on to Park Road, Lenton); Lenton Road (next to Rock Drive: a steep walkway to Castle Boulevard); Fish Pond Drive (on to Castle Boulevard); Newcastle Drive (off Canning Circus) and the Park Tunnel which runs from Tunnel Road to Derby Road (near Budgens store) with a staircase halfway along to Upper College Street. There is a gated walkway from Pelham Crescent to Harlaxton Drive, Lenton.

From 1999 to 2013 the pedestrian gate between Lenton Road and Park Road, Lenton was locked every night between the hours of 11 p.m. and 5 a.m. The estate management argued this was necessary to reduce late night noise and anti-social behaviour, because the route links student-dominated Lenton to the city centre. A public local inquiry was held in 2013 to consider the legal status of Lenton Road, which ruled that it was a public right of way as a public footpath had been present since at least 1700, so should be added to the council's Definitive Map and could not be legally barred with a locked gate. This resulted in the removal of the gate between Lenton Road and Park Road.

=== Maintenance arrangements ===
The Park Estate is a private estate, managed by Nottingham Park Estate Ltd, a company governed by act of Parliament. Living on the estate incurs both council tax and a local charge ('Park Rates'). The rates cover maintenance of roads, pavements, the gas light network, the trees and the public green spaces. Residents previously received a reduced council tax bill due to these rates covering services which would usually be provided by the council. However, the Park Estate rate is now paid in addition to the full council tax rate.

=== Residents' Association ===
The Nottingham Park Residents' Association (NPRA) holds regular talks and hosts a number of events using the two green spaces in the middle of the estate. They also produce a twice yearly magazine which is delivered, free of charge, to every Park Estate household.

In 2011 the NPRA hosted a street party on the day of the Royal Wedding, and, in 2012, a Diamond Jubilee Street Party. Other events include a picnic for young children based on the Teddy Bear picnic song, a Carol Service and Boule tournament. Every two years in June a number of the gardens are open to the public, with the proceeds being donated to local charities.

== Neighbouring areas ==
- Lenton to the west
- Radford to the north
- Nottingham city centre to the east

== Bibliography ==
- The Park Estate, Nottingham, by Ken Brand. Published by Nottingham Civic Society as part of its "Get to know Nottingham" series.
- Fothergill: A Catalogue of the Works of Watson Fothergill, Architect by Darren Turner. Published by DT:P 2012.
