= William Richard Gleave =

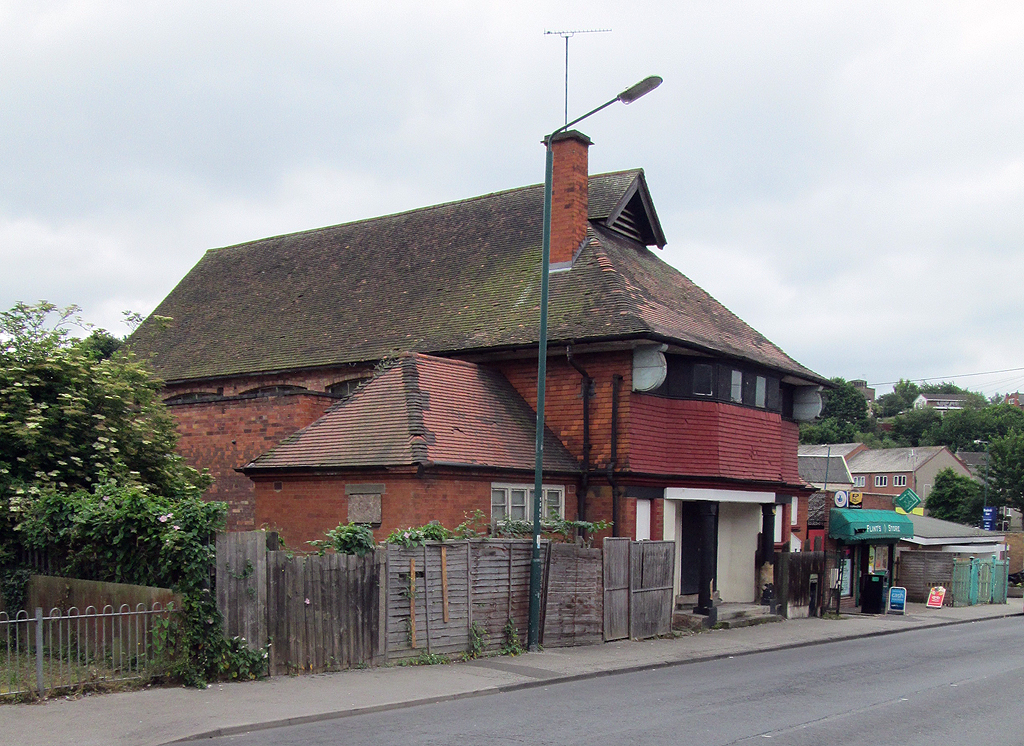
Canon Lewis Memorial Hall, Ransom Road, Nottingham 1907

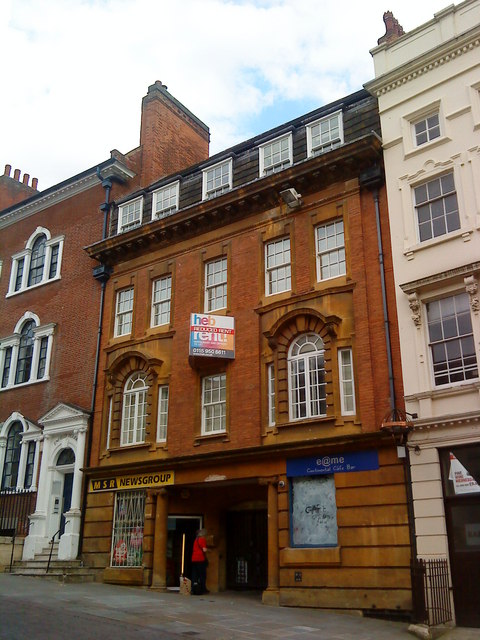
Enfield Chambers, Low Pavement, Nottingham 1909-10

William Richard Gleave ARIBA (1868 – 8 January 1933) was a surveyor and architect based in Nottingham.

== History ==
He was born in 1868, the son of Thomas Gleave (1838–1881) shipbuilder and Anne Jane Hindley (1841–1871). He was christened on 9 August 1868 at Farnworth near Widnes, Cheshire. He was educated at the local Farnworth Grammar School and Chester College.

In 1891 he was living at 81 Herbert Street, Cheetham (now part of Manchester) and employed as an architectural draughtsman and became an Associate of the Royal Institute of British Architects, by examinations, in 1893.

He married Lois Mason (1865–1949) in 1894 in Stockport, Cheshire. Their children were:

- Harold Mason Gleave (1895–1917)
- Ida Kathleen Gleave (1903–1980)

In 1896 he went to Dublin to work in the office of William Hague. He won a competition for cottages in Longford. By 1901 he was living at 44 Henry Road, West Bridgford, Nottingham and by 1905 he was in partnership with Arthur Richard Calvert. He was architect for a number of houses and villas at West Bridgford and commercial buildings in Nottingham. He was engaged as an assistant architect with Arthur Richard Calvert on the Constitutional Club, the Old Moot Hall, the Auction Mart and other buildings in Nottingham.

Around 1913, he formed a partnership with Bernard Jessop, and Charles Henry Calvert (son of Arthur Richard Calvert) as Calvert, Jessop and Gleave.

He died on 8 January 1933 at Hillcrest, Thurgarton, in 1933 and left an estate valued at £22,586 2s. 1d (equivalent to £2,025,400 in 2023).

== Works ==
- 13-31 St Mel’s Road, Longford Town, County Longford, Ireland
- 3 Arkwright Street, Nottingham 1902-03 (Originally a Doctor’s House, later the Nottingham Royal Naval Association. Demolished in November 2012 for extension to Nottingham Express Transit.)
- Thorncliff, St Andrew’s Road, Nottingham 1904 (with Arthur Richard Calvert as a house for Gleave)
- 1-3 Victoria Embankment, Nottingham 1904 (with Arthur Richard Calvert)
- 3 Thorncliffe Rise, Nottingham 1905 (with Arthur Richard Calvert)
- Lady Bay Church, Nottingham 1906 enlargement
- Canon Lewis Memorial Hall, Ransom Road, Nottingham 1907 (with Arthur Richard Calvert)
- Enfield Chambers, 14-16 Low Pavement, Nottingham 1909-10
- Houses, Stockhill Lane, Basford, Nottingham 1919-21
- Sutton on Sea and Trusthorpe War Memorial, Lincolnshire 1920
- Mapperley War Memorial, Scout Lane/Mapperley Plains Road, Nottingham 1922
- 54-56 Milton Street, Nottingham 1927
