= Lawrence Bright =

Architect from England (1847-1908)

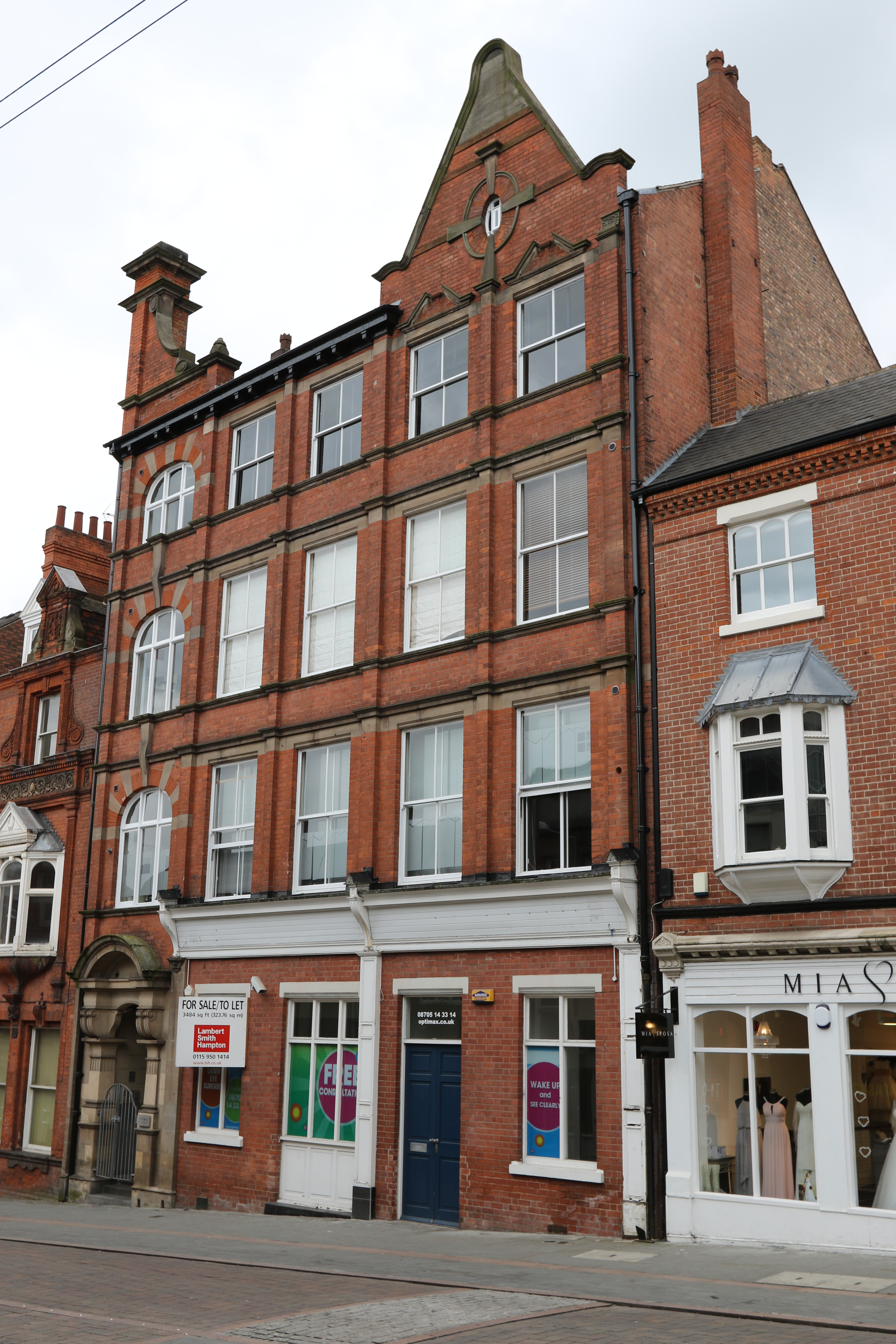
Shops and offices on Heathcote Street 1898–99

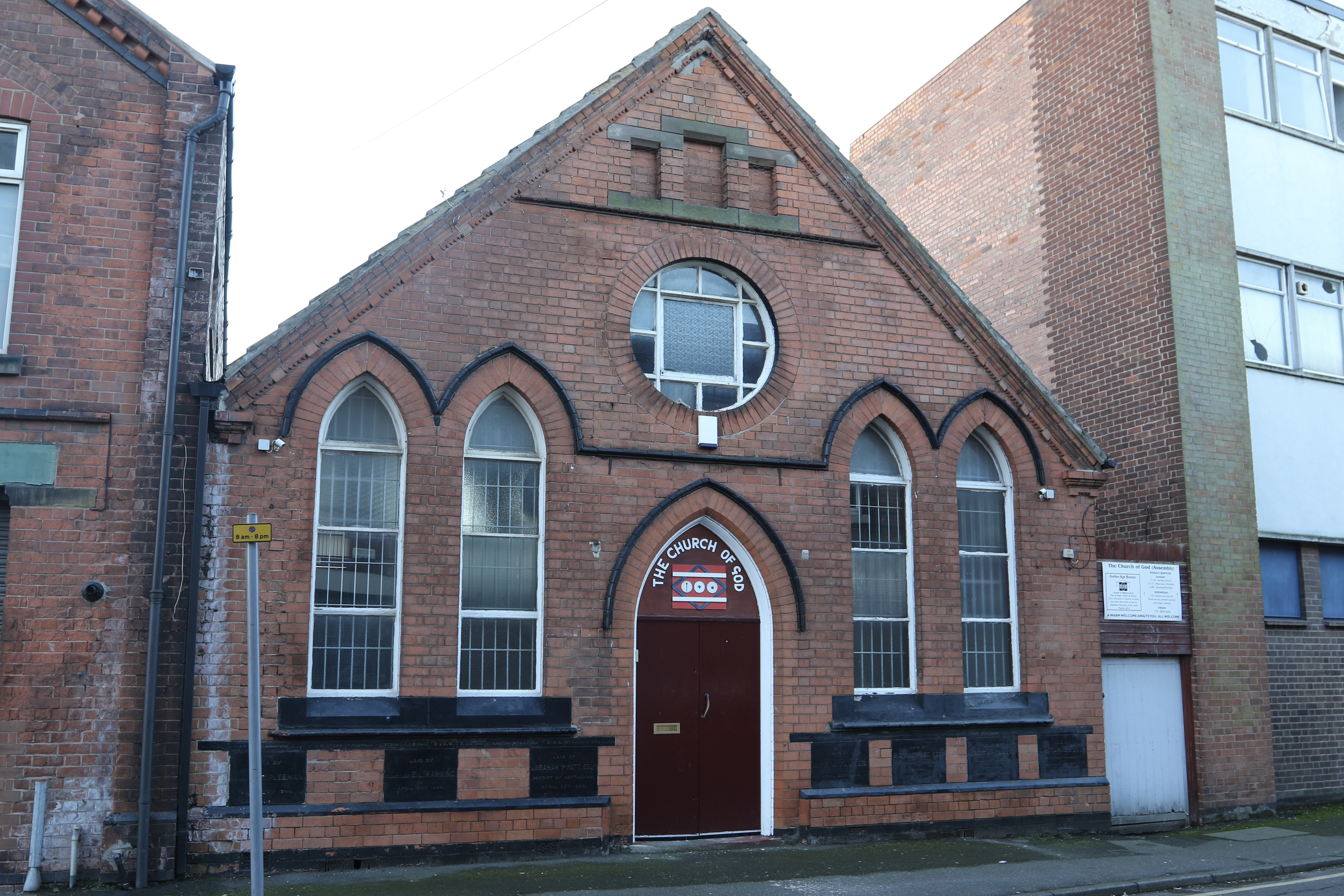
Former Railway Mission, Traffic Street, 1894

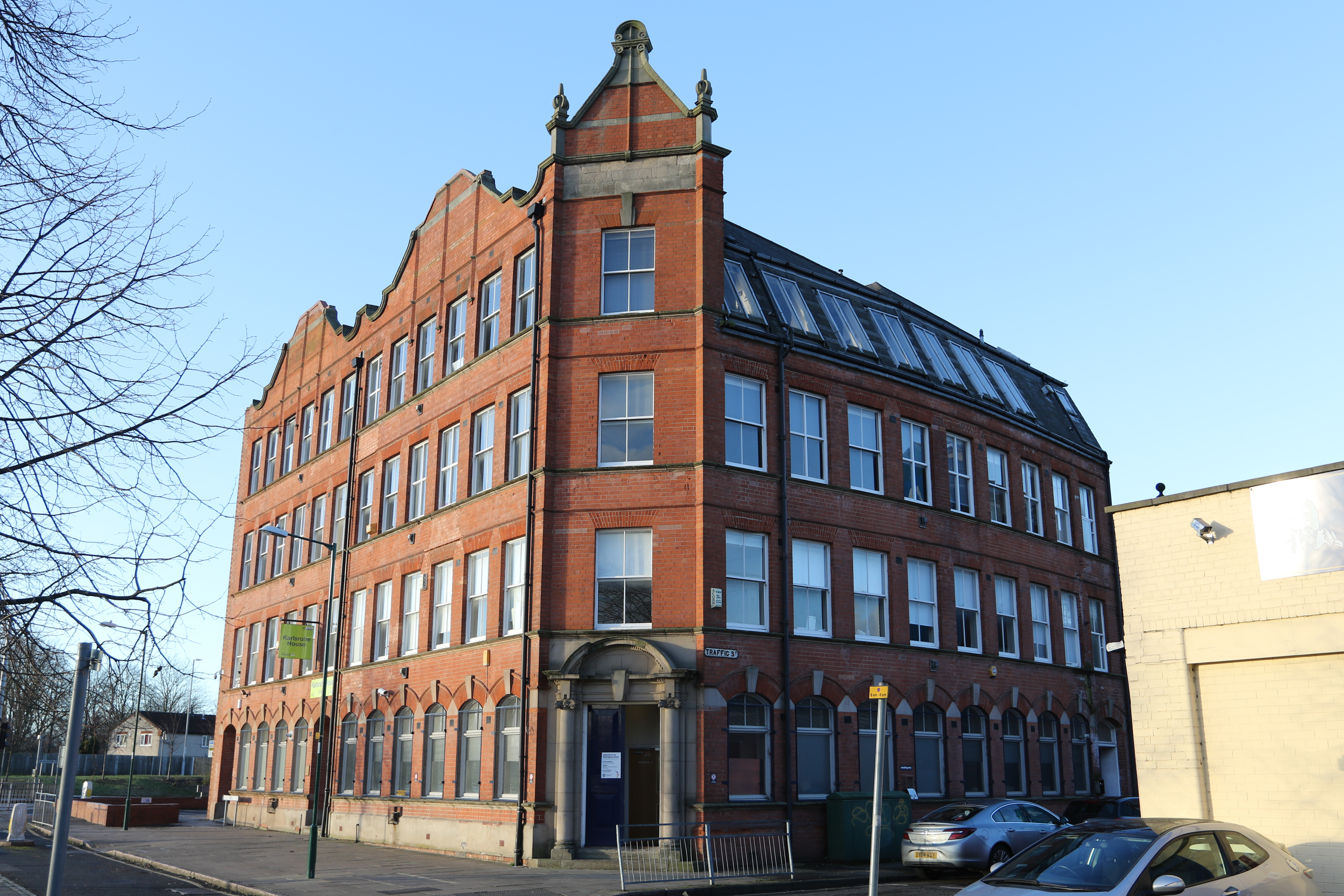
Warehouse (now Karlsruhe House), Queen’s Bridge Road/Traffic Street 1905–06

Lawrence Bright (1847 – 14 November 1908) was an architect based in Nottingham.

== History ==
He was born in 1847, and educated at the Nottingham School of Art. He married Hannah Lee, daughter of Mr. C.J. Lee of Spilsby, on 22 June 1870 at Derby Road Baptist Church, and later went into partnership with his son, Lawrence Lee Bright.

He was a prominent member of the Derby Road Baptist Church. He died at 8 Third-avenue, Sherwood Rise on 14 November 1908 and left an estate of £33,914 (equivalent to £4,714,500 in 2023) to his widow Hannah Bright, and his son, Lawrence Lee Bright.

== Works ==
- 1 to 3, Bridlesmith Gate, Nottingham 1873–75
- Old Angel public house, Stoney Street, Nottingham 1878 additions
- Rutland Chambers, St Peter’s Gate, Nottingham 1888
- Railway Mission Hall, Traffic Street, Nottingham 1893–94
- Boulevard Works, Hartley Road, Nottingham 1896 additions
- Shops and offices, Heathcote Street, Nottingham 1898–99
- Board School, Kirkby in Ashfield, 1900 extension
- Co-operative Stores, Kirkby in Ashfield 1900
- Barclays Bank, Raleigh Street/Alfreton Road, Nottingham 1902
- Midland Counties District Bank, Arkwright Street, Nottingham 1902
- Lenton Hall, University Park, Nottingham 1905 remodelling
- 4 houses, 2-8 Harcourt Street, Beeston, Nottingham 1905
- Warehouse, Queen’s Bridge Road/Traffic Street, Nottingham 1905–06
- Houses on Huntingdon Drive, The Park Estate, Nottingham 1906–08
