= Old Angel Inn =

Pub in Nottingham, England

Coordinates: 52°57′11.98″N 1°8′36.83″W

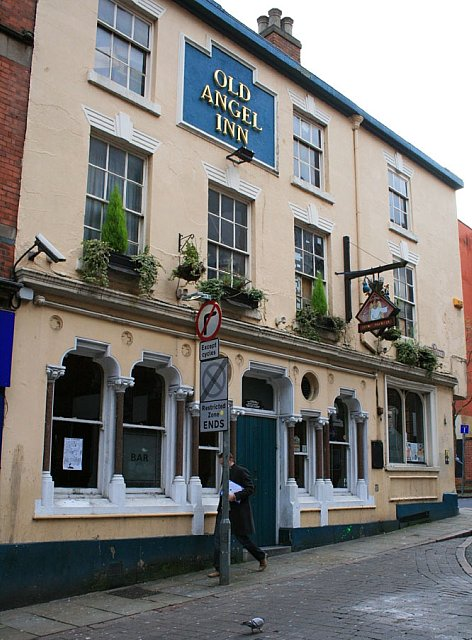
- Showing the building before renaming as The Angel Microbrewery

- Location within Nottingham
- Former names: County Tavern

General information
- Location: 7 Stoney Street, Nottingham

Design and construction
- Designations: Grade II listed

The Old Angel Inn is a Grade II listed public house in the Lace Market, Nottingham.

== History ==
A public house called the Old Angel has existed in the Lace Market area of Nottingham since around 1600. Until the middle of the 19th century, a half-timbered house also known as The Old Angel, existed at the junction of High Pavement and St Mary's Gate.

Originally 2 houses, the current public house building dates from around 1800. In 1878, the landlord W Robinson employed Lawrence Bright to make alterations, and 5 years later, in 1883, the landlord J Robinson made further alterations under the architect H Walker.

In 1911, Horace Shears, cellarman, pleaded guilty to stealing five bottles of whisky, two bottles of gin, one bottle of sherry, and some towels and handkerchiefs to the value of £3 (equivalent to £306 in 2025). He was sent to prison for 2 months.

In the 1980s the pub developed a reputation as a rock and roll venue, with the old chapel on the 1st floor converted into a performance area. Many up and coming bands played here including Oasis, Kasabian and the Arctic Monkeys.

In 2016 it reinvented itself as an organic gastro pub.
