= Park Tunnel, Nottingham =

Park Tunnel
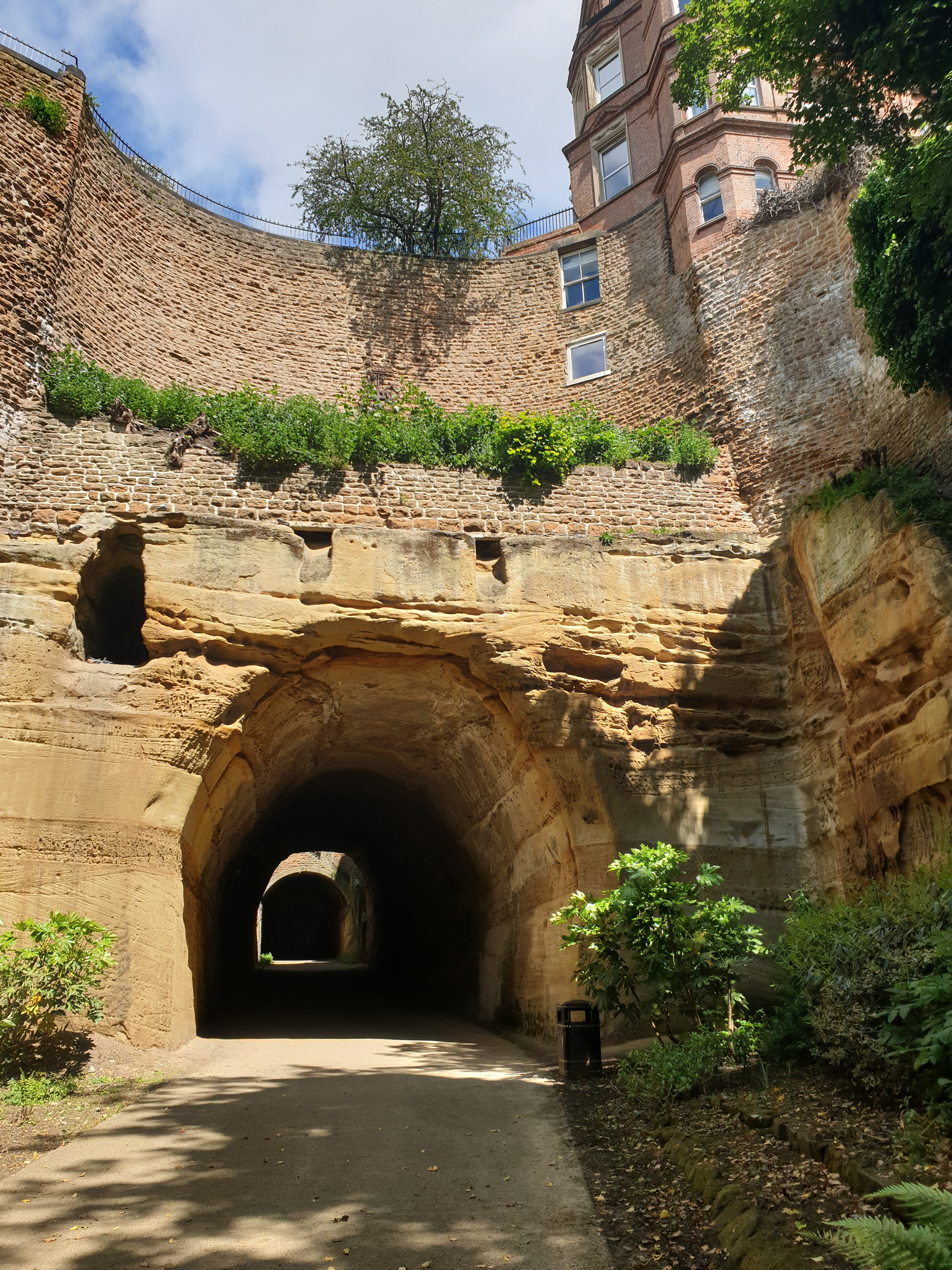
- The Park Tunnel photographed from Tunnel Road in the Park, Nottingham in 2019

Overview
- Location: Nottingham, Nottinghamshire, England
- Coordinates: 52.9544°N 1.1594°W
- Status: Open

Operation
- Opened: 1855
- Owner: Nottingham City Council
- Traffic: Pedestrian

Technical
- Length: 125 metres (410 ft)

The Park Tunnel was built in 1855 to allow access between The Park Estate and Derby Road in the English city of Nottingham.

The tunnel is listed as a Grade II listed building with a list entry number of 1059025.

== Description ==
The tunnel is approximately 125 metres (410 ft) in length, with a central open section some 25 metres (82 ft) in length.

From The Park Estate end, the tunnel is approached from Tunnel Road, and the original vehicular nature of the tunnel is clear from the ramped access. The first section of tunnel passes under Newcastle Drive and the Ropewalk and is unlined, being carved from the natural Nottingham Castle Sandstone. An open section in the centre of the tunnel provides natural light and ventilation, and a staircase ascends around the wall of this opening to the junction of the Ropewalk with Upper College Street. A second tunnel section passes under College Street whilst rising to meet Derby Road, but has been modified and partially blocked by subsequent building works, and access to Derby Road is now via a flight of stairs into the car park of the building above.

== Historical background ==
The Park Estate was formerly a private hunting park for the Duke of Newcastle who was also the owner of the adjacent Nottingham Castle. The Fifth Duke of Newcastle retained architect Thomas Chambers (T.C.) Hine (1813–1899) to design and build the Park Tunnel (primarily as the main entrance to the Park) and to develop the Park as a residential area in central Nottingham for the wealthier members of society. T.C.Hine was also made responsible for the later repair of Nottingham Castle and its conversion into a museum.

== Purpose ==
The tunnel was intended to allow access to and from the park by horse-drawn carriages, and the original requirement was for a tunnel with a maximum gradient of 1 in 14 and the ability for coaches to pass each other within the tunnel. As built, the tunnel actually had a gradient of 1 in 12, which was considered too great for horse-drawn carriages, and as easier accesses were constructed elsewhere in The Park Estate, it never fulfilled its original purpose. However the tunnel is still in use, providing pedestrian access to and from The Park Estate.

== See also ==
- Listed buildings in Nottingham (Radford and Park ward)
