= John Collyer =

English architect

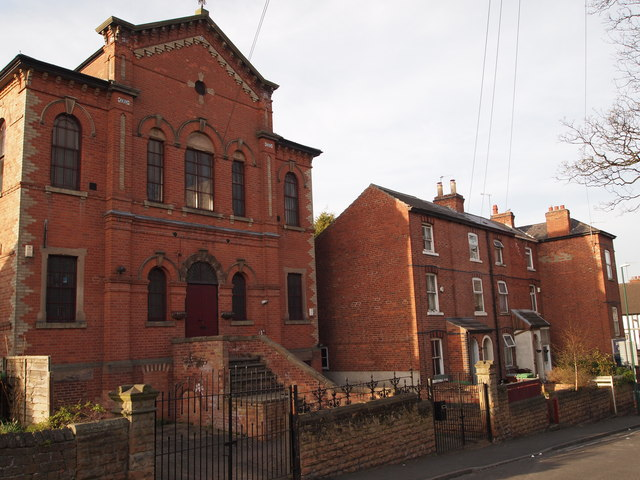
Wesleyan Chapel, High Street (now Basford Road), Basford, Nottingham 1874

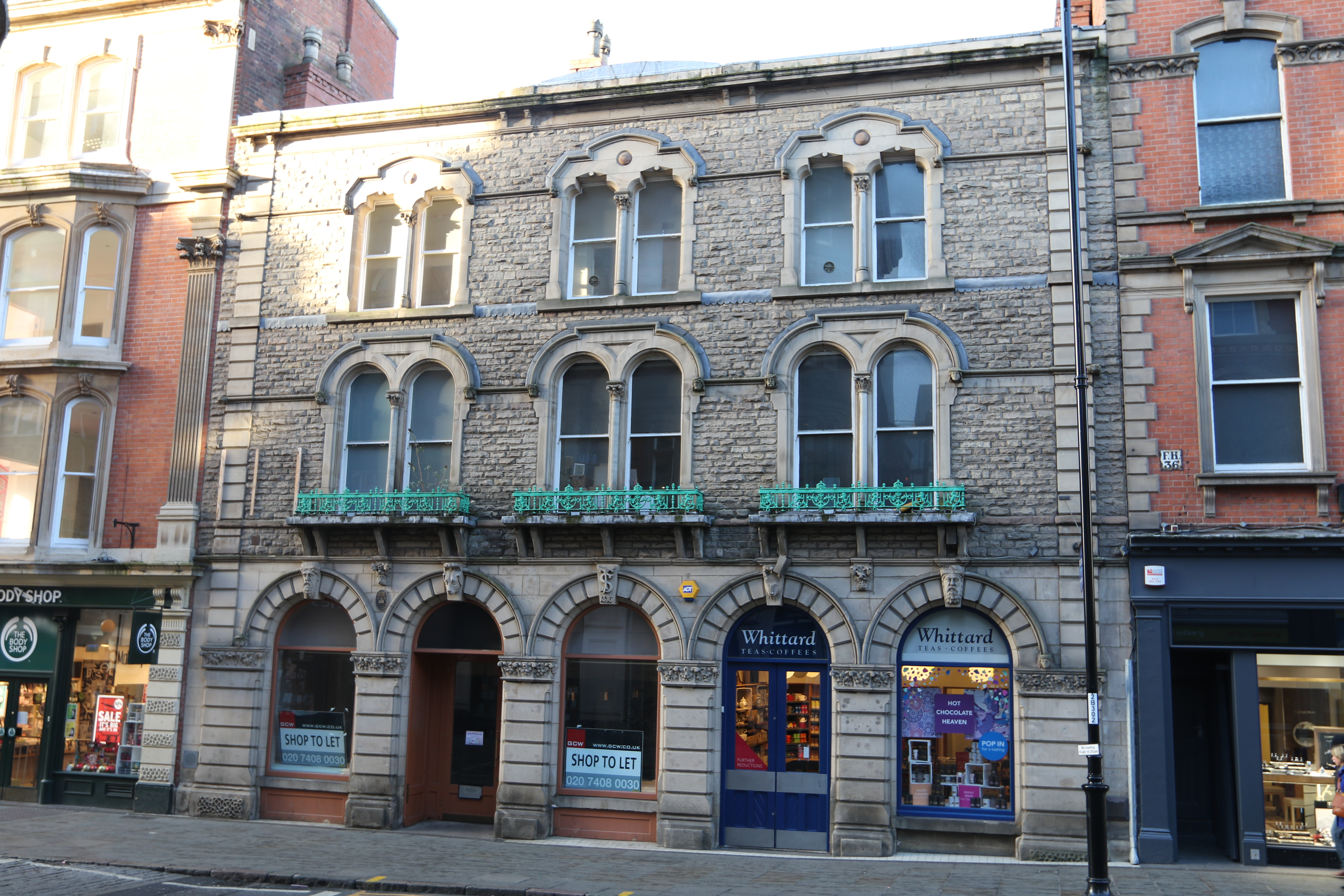
Former Dog and Bear public house, Bridlesmith Gate 1876

John Collyer (1840 – 12 August 1876) was an architect based in Nottingham.

== History ==
He was born in 1840 in Calverton, Nottinghamshire, the son of John Collyer and Sarah Windle. He established himself as an architect in Nottingham, initially in offices in Cobden Chambers, Market Street, then on South Parade, and from 1873 in Thurland Street.

He married Martha Sarah Adamson in 1866 in Southwell, Nottinghamshire. He died on 12 August 1876 aged 36.

== Works ==
- Houses on Belgrave Square, Nottingham 1869 (behind St Andrew's United Reformed Church. Houses now demolished)
- Wesleyan School, Kirklington Road, Southwell 1871.
- Methodist New Connexion Chapel, Baker Street, Hucknall Torkard 1872-73
- Wesleyan Methodist Chapel, Tennyson Street, Nottingham 1873-74 (now demolished)
- Wesleyan Chapel, High Street, Old Basford 1874
- Methodist New Connexion Chapel, High Street, Long Eaton 1874 (demolished)
- Albert Hotel, Derby Road, Nottingham 1876 (demolished)
- Dog and Bear public house, Bridlesmith Gate 1876 (now shops).
