= Miss Cullen's Almshouses =

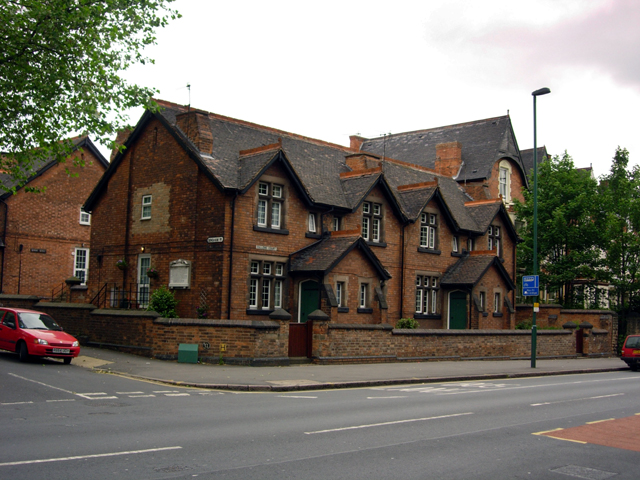

- Location within Nottinghamshire
- 52°58′38.5″N 1°8′58.7″W
- Location: Sherwood, Nottingham, Nottinghamshire, England

History
- Built: 1882-83
- Built for: Elizabeth Cullen and Marianne Cullen

Site notes
- Architect(s): Evans and Jolley

Miss Cullen's Almshouses in Carrington, Nottingham, is a complex of 12 almshouses erected in 1882–83. They are also known as the Cullen Memorial Homes.

The architects were Evans and Jolley. The work was supervised by William Roberts of Acacia House, Beeston, with the practical part in the hands of Mr. Ball. The sub-contractors for stone work were Mr. Bishop of Nottingham and for plastering Messrs. Clarke Bros., of Nottingham. They were paid for by Elizabeth Cullen and Marianne Cullen of Park Valley, Nottingham, in memory of their brother James Cullen, who died in 1878. The endowment provided the occupants with an income of 4s. 6d. (equivalent to £23.65 in 2025) a month.

The almshouses are maintained by the Miss Cullen's Almshouses Charity (217572).

Following the death of Marianne in 1900, her bequest of £900 funded a new Royal National Lifeboat Institution (RNLI) lifeboat, which was stationed at Bull Bay Lifeboat Station on Anglesey, Wales in 1904. At her request, the lifeboat was also named in memory of her late brother, James Cullen (ON 528).
