= Bull Bay Lifeboat Station =

Former RNLI lifeboat station in Anglesey, Wales

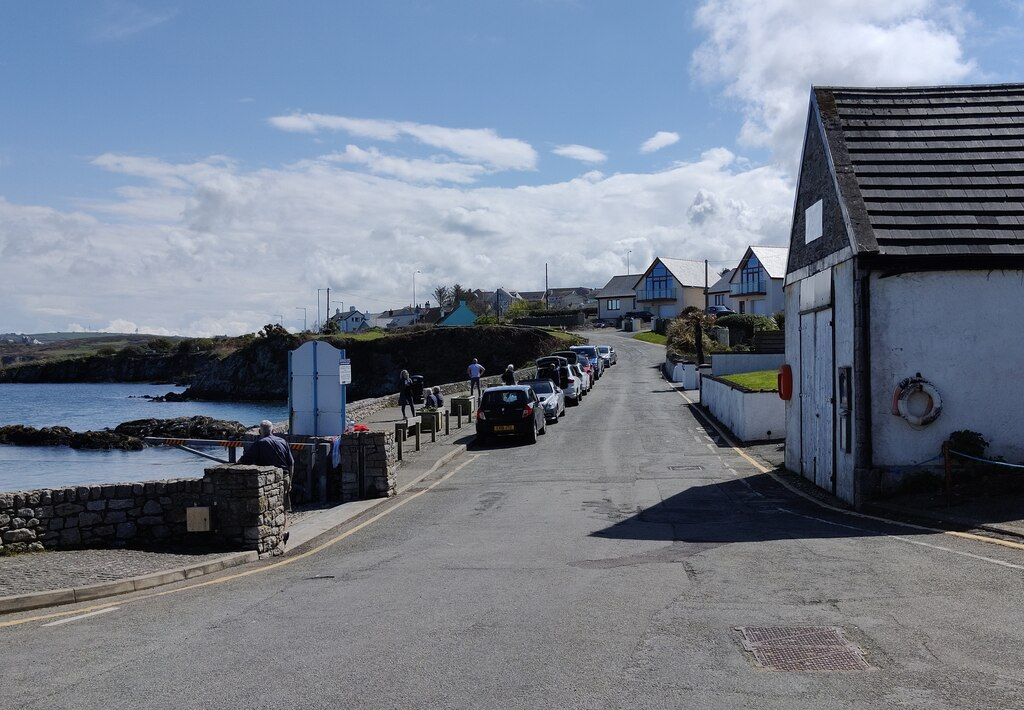
- Bull Bay 1868 Lifeboat House

- Bull Bay (Porth Llechog), Anglesey

General information
- Status: Closed
- Type: RNLI Lifeboat Station
- Location: Lifeboat House, Bull Bay, Amlwch, Anglesey, LL68 9SW, Wales
- Coordinates: 53°25′19.9″N 4°22′13.8″W
- Opened: 1868
- Closed: 1926

Bull Bay Lifeboat Station was located at Bull Bay (Porth Llechog), near the town of Amlwch, on the north coast of Anglesey, Wales.

A lifeboat station was established at Bull Bay by the Royal National Lifeboat Institution (RNLI) in 1868.

Bull Bay Lifeboat Station was closed in 1926.

== History ==
In 1867, the RNLI decided to establish an additional lifeboat station at Bull Bay. "It was considered that an additional life-boat would be useful on that rocky coast, there being a large passing trade, and a long gap between the two life-boat establishments at Moelfre and Cemlyn."

A new boathouse was constructed on a site granted by Henry Paget, 2nd Marquess of Anglesey, at a cost of £158, and in the November of that year, £400 for a new lifeboat was received from Miss Holt, of Anglesey. An order was placed for a 32-foot self-righting (P&S) lifeboat, one with (10) oars and sails, which arrived on station in March 1868. At the donor's request, the lifeboat was named Eleanor. "The boat can always be readily launched from a small sandy cove near the boat-house, under shelter, and be able to board vessels in danger before their coming on to the rocks."

In dense fog on 9 March 1877, the Ocean liner Dakota of the Liverpool and Great Western Steamship Company, ran ashore under the cliffs near East Mouse, on passage from Liverpool to New York with 530 passengers and crew. Fortunately conditions were calm, so many local boats, along with the Bull Bay lifeboat and Rocket Brigade, went to the aid of the vessel. 20 people were brought ashore in the lifeboat, which then stood by as all the other small boats ferried passengers and crew ashore. No lives were lost. The vessel broke in two the following day and was a total wreck.

A new lifeboat was placed at Bull Bay in 1884. Costing £290, a 34-foot 10-oared self-righting lifeboat, built by Woolfe and Son, with a launch carriage costing a further £118. The boat was funded by Miss Curling of Camberwell, and was duly named Curling (ON 67).

Coxswain John Hughes retired in 1890. He had served as coxswain since the station opened in 1868. In recognition of his many service calls, listed, he was awarded the RNLI Silver Medal.

- Schooner Albion, 12 February 1871
- boat of Schooner George IV, 1873
- Schooner Baltic, 14 August 1874
- Steamship Dakota, 9 May 1877
- Steamship Arabian, 7 October 1879
- Schooner Pacific, 22 December 1886
- Schooner Ocean Belle, 22 December 1886
- Barque President Harbitz, 6 September 1889

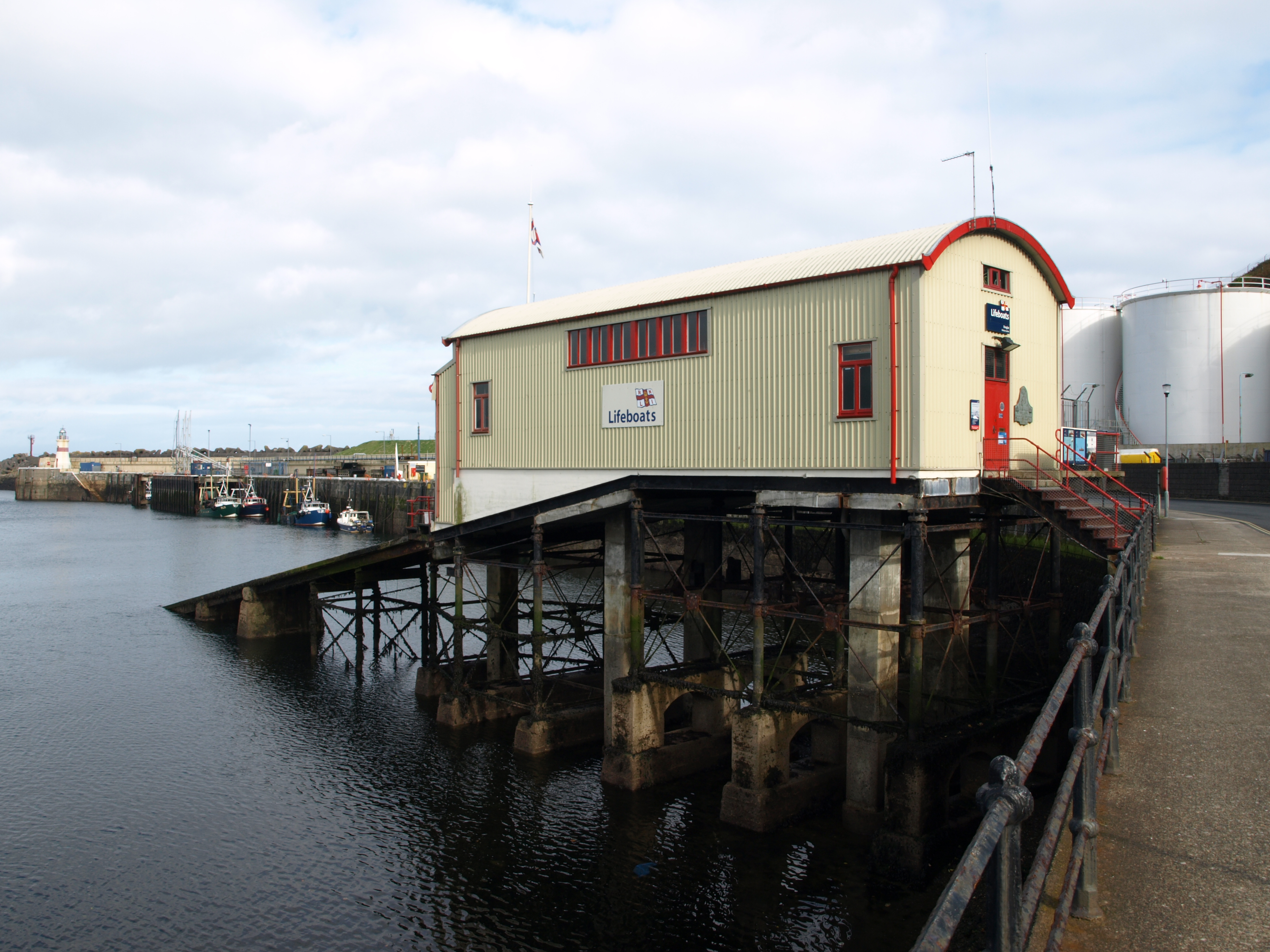
Typical boathouse

In 1904, a new boathouse with roller-slipway was constructed over the shore, standing on steel piles, very much to the design of the one pictured (Douglas, IOM). Constructed at a cost of £2000, it was to house a new 38 ft (12 m) non-self-righting Watson-class P&S lifeboat, costing £993. The lifeboat, which would turn out to be the last one stationed at Bull Bay, was funded from the bequest of £900 from Miss Marianne Cullen of Park Valley, Nottingham, known for having funded a complex of 12 Almshouses in Carrington, Nottingham. As per her request, the lifeboat was named James Cullen (ON 528).

On 20 February 1915, the cargo ship S.S. Cambank of Cardiff was torpedoed and sunk off Point Lynas, Anglesey by Submarine U-30 of the Imperial German Navy. Four of the 25 crew were lost, but the remaining 21 were picked up from the ships boat by Bull Bay lifeboat James Cullen.

Bull Bay lifeboat had a good regular service record, the lifeboat being launched 41 times over a period of 58 years, and rescuing 63 lives. However, at a meeting of the RNLI committee of management on 22 April 1926, it was decided that the station would be closed.

The lifeboat James Cullen (ON 528) was withdrawn in June 1926, and sold from service. In private ownership, it was later renamed Vika, Meine Leibe and finally Pride of Anglesey, before being broken up in Rochester, Kent in 1996.

The 1904 boathouse was removed, although the concrete pile footings can still be seen today.

The 1868 boathouse still stands. For many years it was home to the Bull Bay Yacht and Boat Club, but came up for sale in 2024. Acquired by a benefactor, a local group are hoping to raise enough funds to create a community hub.

== Station honours ==
The following are awards made at Bull Bay:

- RNLI Silver Medal

John Hughes, Coxswain – 1890

== Bull Bay lifeboats ==
=== Pulling and Sailing (P&S) lifeboats ===
ON (Note: ON is the RNLI's Official Number of the boat.)	Name	Built	On station	Class	Comments
Pre-517	Eleanor	1868	1868–1884	32-foot Prowse Self-righting (P&S)	(Note: 32-foot x 7-foot 6in (10-oared) Prowse-class self-righting (P&S) lifeboat, gift of Miss A. Holt of Bryn-Teg, Anglesey, built by Forrestt of Limehouse, London, costing £246.)
67	Curling	1884	1884–1889	34-foot Self-righting (P&S)	(Note: 34-foot x 7-foot 6in (10-oared) self-righting (P&S) lifeboat, gift of Miss Curling of Denmark Hill, built by Woolfe of Shadwell, London, costing £290.)
243	Curling	1889	1889–1903	34-foot Self-righting (P&S)	(Note: 34-foot x 8-foot (10-oared) self-righting (P&S) lifeboat, gift of Miss Curling of Denmark Hill, built by D. and W. Henderson and Company of Partick, costing £442.)
57	Annie Collin	1885	1903–1904	34-foot Self-righting (P&S)	(Note: 34-foot x 8-foot (10-oared) self-righting (P&S) lifeboat, legacy of Miss A. Collin of London, built by Forrestt of Limehouse, London, costing £368 when new.); Previously at Tenby.
528	James Cullen	1904	1904–1926	38-foot Watson (P&S)	(Note: 38-foot x 9-foot 4in (12-oared) Watson-class non-self-righting (P&S) lifeboat, legacy of Miss M. Cullen of Nottingham, built by Thames Ironworks of Blackwall, London, costing £993.)

Station Closed, 1926

Pre ON numbers are unofficial numbers used by the Lifeboat Enthusiasts' Society to reference early lifeboats not included on the official RNLI list.

== See also ==
- List of RNLI stations
- List of former RNLI stations
- Royal National Lifeboat Institution lifeboats
