= Stoney Street, Nottingham =

Street in Nottingham, England

Stoney Street
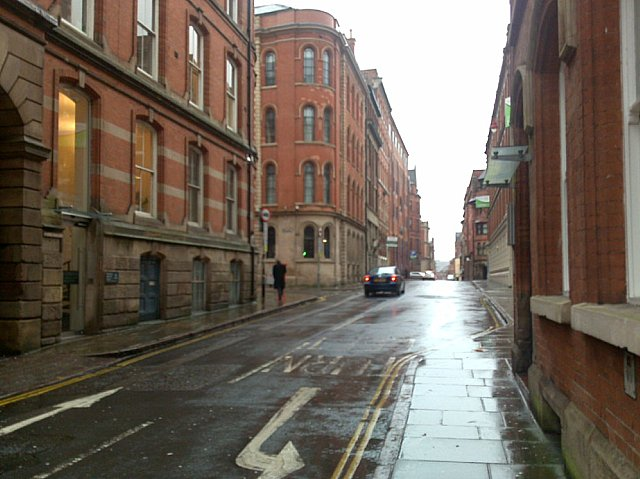
- Stoney Street, looking north

- Location within Nottingham
- Maintained by: Nottingham City Council
- Coordinates: 52°57′6.65″N 1°8′33.72″W

Stoney Street is an historic street in Nottingham City Centre between High Pavement and Carlton Street.

== History ==
The street is medieval and formed the north to south spine of the Saxon town.

For many years the street was a cul-de-sac, terminating before the current junction with High Pavement. It was a residential street by the eighteenth century, containing some fine mansions including Plumptre House and Pierrepont House.

During the 19th century, the residential properties were replaced by Lace factories and these buildings still dominate the street.

== Notable buildings ==
- 2 and 2A, 2 houses, early 19th century Now houses and shops.
- 3, Warehouse, 1896 by Richard Charles Sutton Now a fish bar.
- 7, Old Angel Public House, dated ca. 1800, then 1878 by Lawrence Bright, and 1883 by H Walker.
- 8 to 14, Adams Buildings, 1855 by Thomas Chambers Hine
- 16, Birkin Brothers Warehouse, 1872 by Robert Evans and William Jolley
- 19, Warehouse,
- 21 to 27, Warehouse, 19th century, with additions in 1910 by William Dymock Pratt
- 34 and 34A, Eastgate House, Warehouse, 1850-60
- 37, Warehouse, 1894 by John Howitt
- 39, Warehouse, 19th century, altered in 1905 by Gilbert Smith Doughty
- 47, Mills and Gibbs Warehouse, 19th century, altered in 1902 by Gilbert Smith Doughty
- 49 and 51, Warehouse, 1883 by Richard Charles Sutton
