= Arthur Richard Calvert =

English architect (1852–1922)

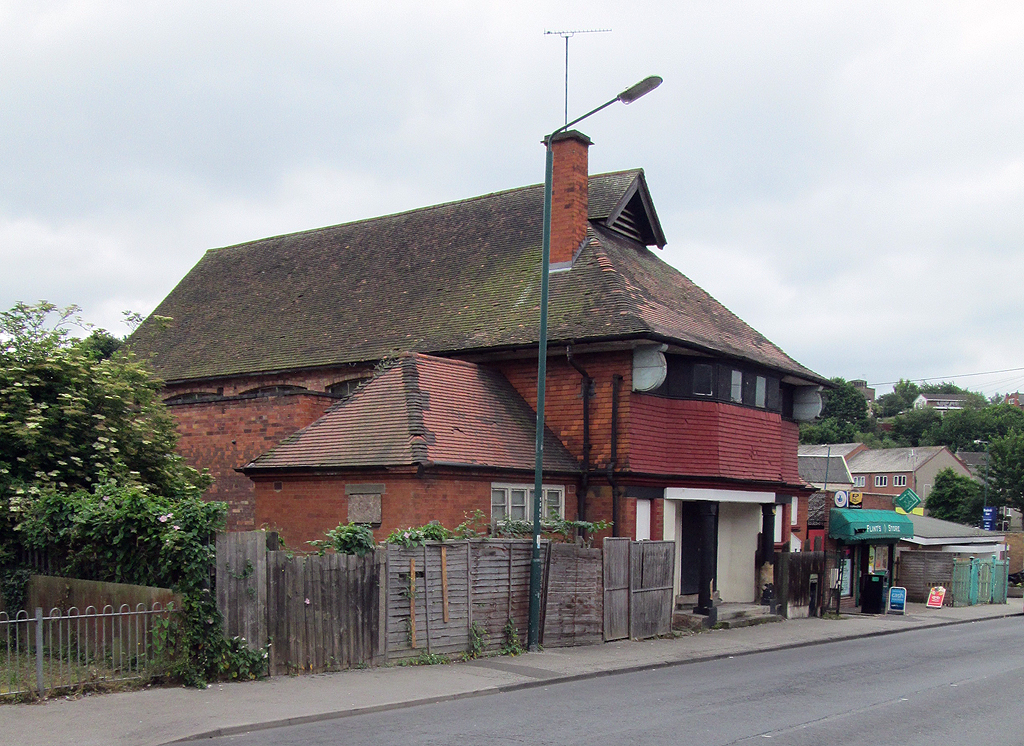
Canon Lewis Memorial Hall, Ransom Road, Nottingham 1907

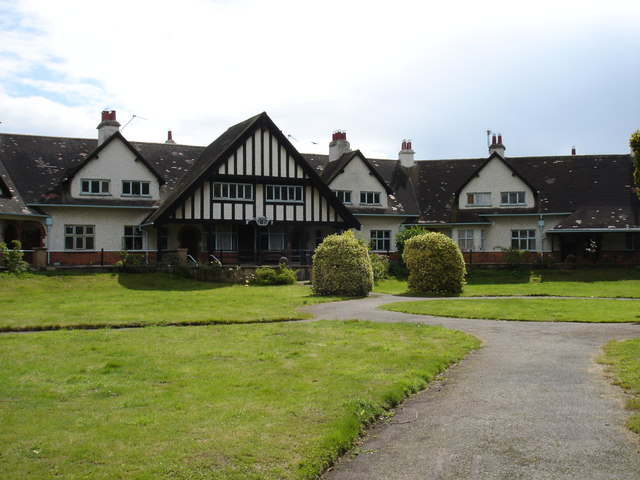
Dorothy Boot Homes, Wilford 1908

Arthur Richard Calvert (1852-1 September 1922) was an architect based in Nottingham.

== History ==
He was born in Clapham, Surrey in 1852, the son of Revd. William Bainbridge Calvert (1821-1892) and Charlotte Caparn.

He was educated at Tonbridge School and articles to M.M. Kirkland of Huddersfield. Afterwards he spent time with the Borough Surveyor of Huddersfield, and then 3 years in the practice of Evans and Jolley in Nottingham.

He set up in independent practice in Nottingham in 1879. He was later in partnership with William Warren Wright, but this came to an end in 1891. By 1905 he was in partnership with William Richard Gleave.

On the 9 September 1880, he married Mary Caroline Holmes in Huddersfield. They had 5 children:

- Kathleen Mary Calvert (1881-1969)
- Charlotte Helen Calvert (1882-1925)
- Margaret Esther Calvert (1885-1918)
- Charles Henry Calvert (1886-1958)
- Muriel Calvert (1887-1959)

He died on 1 September 1922 at 18 Dagmar Grove, Nottingham and left an estate of £1,170 4s. 9d. (equivalent to £80,700 in 2023).

== Works ==
- Housing, 2-12 Dale Street, Sneinton, Nottingham 1894
- Nottingham and County Constitutional Club, 26-28 Market Street, Nottingham 1897 (Alexandra House in 2016)
- Morris and Place’s Auction Mart, 25 Bridlesmith Gate, Nottingham 1900
- Giltbrook Almshouses 1901
- 8 Low Pavement, Nottingham 1903
- Nottingham Savings Bank, 11 Low Pavement, Nottingham 1903 (with Gleave) alterations
- Shops and houses, Victoria Embankment, Nottingham 1904 (with Gleave)
- 30 Bridlesmith Gate, Nottingham 1906-07
- The Canon Lewis Memorial Hall, Ransom Road, Nottingham 1907 (with Gleave)
- Dorothy Boot Homes, Wilford, Nottingham 1908
- Old Moot Hall Wine Vaults 1908 rebuilding
- Estate Office, 7a Lenton Road, The Park Estate, Nottingham 1909
- Enfield Chambers, 14-16 Low Pavement, Nottingham 1909-10 (with Gleave)
