= Hart, Fellow's and Company =

Hart, Fellow’s and Company bank
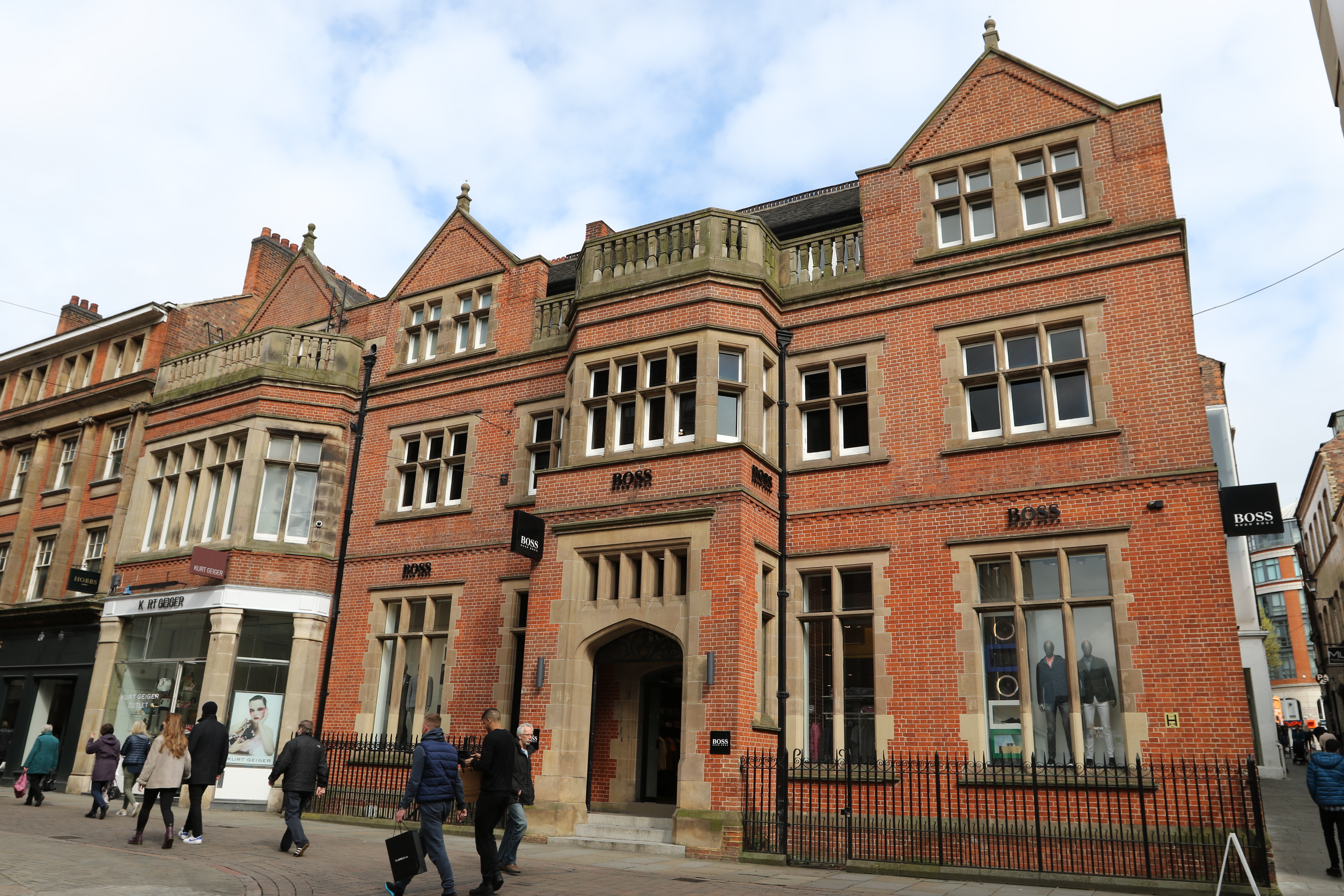
- The headquarters of Hart, Fellows & Company Bank on Bridlesmith Gate, Nottingham as rebuilt in 1884-85
- Founded: January 1, 1808; 218 years ago in Nottingham, England
- Defunct: 1891
- Successor: Lloyds Bank
- Headquarters: Bridlesmith Gate, Nottingham, England

Hart, Fellow’s and Company bank was a private bank established in 1808 with its headquarters on Bridlesmith Gate, Nottingham.

== History ==
It was established on 1 January 1808 as Fellows, Mellor & Hart. The partners were John Fellows, Francis Hart and a Mr Mellor.

From about 1824 the business was styled Hart, Fellows & Co. In 1865 it was acquired by the English Joint Stock Bank which failed in May 1866. It was restarted as a private partnership by Francis Hart and Alfred-Thomas Fellows as Hart, Fellows & Company.

Between 1884 and 1885 the bank headquarters on Bridlesmith Gate in Nottingham was rebuilt and expanded to designs of the architects Evans and Jolley.

In 1891 it was acquired by Lloyds Bank.
