= White Stuff Clothing =

British fashion and lifestyle brand

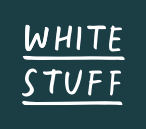
- Industry: Retail
- Founded: Val d'Isère, 1985 as Boys from the White Stuff
- Founder: George Treves; Sean Thomas
- Headquarters: London, United Kingdom
- Area served: United Kingdom
- Products: Clothing; Casual Menswear and Womenswear; Accessories
- Revenue: £184 million (2024-25)
- Website: www.whitestuff.com

White Stuff Clothing is a British fashion and lifestyle brand that sells women’s, men’s, and children's clothing, accessories, homeware, and gifts. White Stuff merchandise can be found in over 124 shops in the United Kingdom, or via mail-order catalogues and online shopping. The brand has become known for its traditional British styles, idiosyncratic boutique stores and innovative marketing campaigns.

White Stuff Clothing was founded in 1985 by George Treves and Sean Thomas under the name “Boys from the White Stuff” ("white stuff" refers to snow). Their printed T-shirts and sweatshirts became popular in the alpine region of Val d'Isère. The first White Stuff Clothing store was opened in London in 1991.

== History ==
White Stuff was founded in 1985 by two friends, George Treves and Sean Thomas. Keen skiers, the pair decided to work together to find a way to fund their passion. They devised a business plan to sell T-shirts with abstract motifs that would appeal to skiers. They came up with the name "Boys from the White Stuff" – a play on the title of the popular film and TV series “Boys from the Blackstuff” by Alan Bleasdale. Sean Thomas sold the initial batch of 100 T-shirts very quickly in the company’s inaugural year, while George Treves stayed at home in the UK to work on a course at a catering college.

The following season, they began printing sweatshirts as well as T-shirts which, according to Treves, “started to gain Alpine kudos as a grassroots level; it had an aspirational value for holidaymakers who had seen ski workers wearing it”. Treves and Thomas toured the French Alpine ski resort town of Val d'Isère, selling their products in hotels and bars from a suitcase. During the off-season, when they were unable to sell their garments, Treves worked as a decorator and Thomas as a driver.

At the turn of the 21st Century, Treves and Thomas continued to design White Stuff’s clothing lines. In February 2004, Thomas and Treves hired Sally Bailey, former Brand Director of Miss Selfridge, to help develop the brand. Over the next five years, Bailey moved the White Stuff label away from its original image as a winter wear retailer to begin focusing on a more bohemian, urban audience. Bailey stepped down from her position as CEO in 2013 and was replaced by Jeremy Seigal, formerly of Watson and The Perfume Shop.

In 2018, Jo Jenkins, previously at Marks and Spencer, joined the company as CEO. By 2018, the company had grown to have more than 115 stores across England, Wales, Scotland and Northern Ireland, including stores in Guernsey and Isle of Man. White Stuff is also available in House of Fraser and John Lewis stores in the UK, and in Germany as part of Karstadt.

In October 2024, the company was acquired by TFG London, a South African retail group owned by The Foschini Group.

== White Stuff Foundation ==
White Stuff Clothing created a charitable foundation, which is supported by 1% of their profits.

The White Stuff Foundation was founded in May 2010 in celebration of the company's 25th anniversary. The foundation is supported by 1% of their profits and is based in Lambeth, London.

Currently, the White Stuff Foundation supports more than 100 small and local charities in the UK. These are predominantly in the urban areas close to White Stuff's stores and distribution centres, and every branch of White Stuff is partnered with its own charity. The White Stuff Foundation also supports two charities in India and two in Denmark.

White Stuff stores are responsible for hosting their own fundraising events. This has led to the creation of many campaigns, including Surf Relief, Give a Gnome a Home, National Wear a Tea Cosy on Your Head Day, and Charity Flip Flops, as well as local events, such as bake sales and raffles throughout each year.

== Stores ==
In 1991, the first White Stuff shop was opened in Clapham, London. White Stuff regularly hosts events inside its stores, allows customers to bring pets inside with them, and has dedicated areas for children with colouring books and dens. Some White Stuff stores include their own cinemas, pick ‘n’ mix counters and bespoke changing rooms decorated in themed styles.

As of October 2024, White Stuff operates 113 stores and 46 concessions in the UK. The brand maintains a presence in Europe with six stores and 25 concessions, partnering with major retailers such as John Lewis and Marks & Spencer. White Stuff also has a strong wholesale distribution network with 428 worldwide and the remaining in the UK and Ireland.
