= Halifax Place Wesleyan Chapel =

- Halifax Place Wesleyan Chapel
- 52°57′06″N 1°08′41″W
- Location: Nottingham
- Country: England
- Denomination: Wesleyan Methodist

Architecture
- Completed: 1798
- Closed: 1930
- Demolished: 1966

Halixfax Place Wesleyan Chapel was a former Methodist Chapel in Nottingham from 1798 to 1930. The building dating from 1847 had the highest ceiling of any Wesleyan Methodist church in England. The building was finally demolished in 1966.

== History ==
=== First chapel of 1798 ===
From the early days of Methodism in Nottingham around 1740, services were held in a variety of locations as the society grew. In 1782 they moved to Hockley Chapel in Goose Gate. When the New Connexion took over this chapel, the Wesleyans left and purchased some land in Halifax Place. A foundation stone was laid on 13 June 1798 and the chapel opened on 2 December 1798. It was 84.5 ft long and 53 ft broad and could seat 1,600 people.

=== Second chapel of 1847 ===
The congregation expanded and by 1846 it was no longer large enough. It was replaced by a larger chapel opened on 23 February 1847 built by Mr. Simpson, an architect of Leeds. This new chapel was 63.5 ft by 95.6 ft, and contained a gallery extending entirely round the wall, with semi-circular ends, and a space of 20 ft in length in the middle. It was constructed by the contractors Elliott and Simpson and Mr. Dale of Nottingham.

It was in these premises that the commemoration of the Wesleyan centenary took place on 25 October 1839.

The final service was held on 29 June 1930 and the congregation then united with Broad Street Wesleyan Church.

It was demolished in 1966.

== Organ ==
On the opening of the new chapel in 1847, a pipe organ was installed by Gray and Davison. A specification of the organ can be found on the National Pipe Organ Register.
