= William Jolley (architect) =

English architect

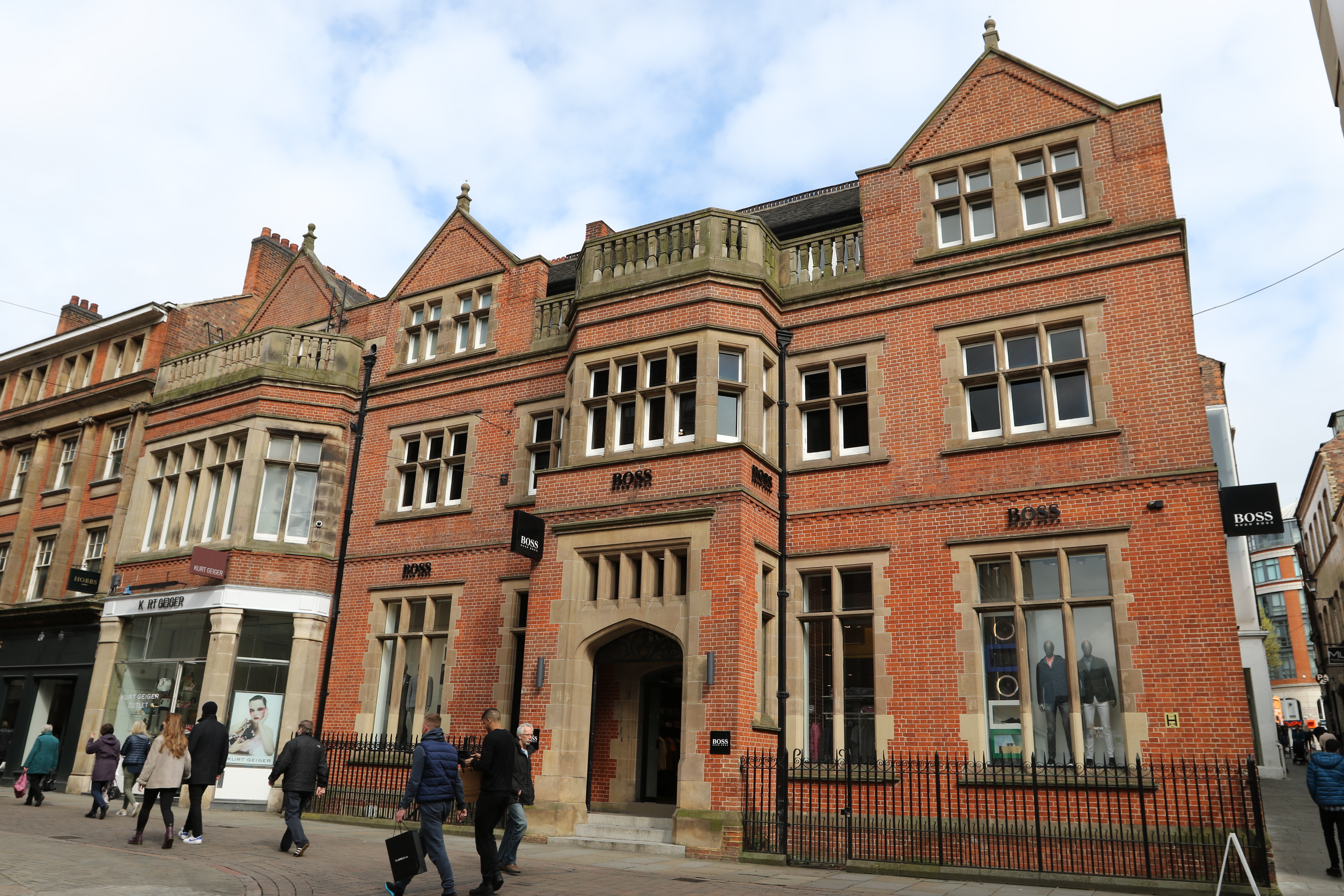
Hart, Fellow's and Company Bank, Bridlesmith Gate 1884

William Jolley (1836 - 13 February 1919) was an English architect based in Nottingham.

== History ==
He was born in 1836, the son of William Jolley (1801–1886) and Elizabeth Moore (1800–1857) and baptised on 9 August 1836 in St Alkmund's Church, Derby.

He trained as an architect as a pupil by Thomas Chambers Hine and then went to work for 13 years in the office of Sir George Gilbert Scott in London. He then moved to be an assistant with Robert Evans JP in Eldon Chambers. The partnership of Evans and Jolley was established in 1871 and lasted until 1894.

He died on 13 February 1919 and left an estate of 22,402 7s. 8d. (equivalent to £957,100 in 2023).

== Works ==
- Club, 12 Victoria Street, Nottingham 1872 with Evans
- Birkin Brothers lace warehouse, 16 Stoney Street, Nottingham 1872 with Evans (plus additions in 1881)
- Lewis and Grundy ironmongers shop, Victoria Street, Nottingham 1873 extended with Evans
- Holy Trinity Church, Kirk Ireton 1873 with Evans. Restoration.
- St Mary’s Schools, Bath Street, Nottingham 1872-74 with Evans
- St Peter's Church, Nottingham 1875 with Evans. Renewal of the chancel and north transept
- St John the Baptist Church, Beeston 1876 with Evans. Addition of organ chamber.
- St Mary the Virgin’s Church, Weston-on-Trent, 1876-77 with Evans. Restoration.
- St Augustine's Church, Basford, Nottingham 1877 with Evans. North aisle added 1884. Chancel 1895.
- St Jude's Church, Mapperley 1877 with Evans.
- All Saints' Church, Cotgrave 1877–78 with Evans. Restoration.
- Warehouse, Stanford Street, Nottingham 1878-79
- People’s College, College Street, Nottingham 1881, 1891–92 and 1897 all additions with Evans
- Paton House, University of Nottingham 1881 with Evans
- Miss Cullen's Almshouses, Nottingham 1882-83 with Evans
- Priory Church of St Anthony, Lenton 1884 restoration
- Hart, Fellow's and Company Bank, Bridlesmith Gate, Nottingham 1884 with Evans
- Shop, South Parade/Wheeler Gate, Nottingham 1888 with Evans
- Lenton Firs, University of Nottingham 1888 with Evans remodelling
- House and shop, South Parade, Nottingham 1889 with Evans
- Warehouse, 11 Warser Gate, Nottingham 1890 with Evans
- Nottingham Hospital for Women, Castle Gate, Nottingham 1890 with Evans. New central entrance.
- St Wilfrid's Church, Egginton Derbyshire 1891–92. with Evans. Restoration.
- 17-21 Houndsgate, Nottingham. Warehousing for James Snook & Co, drapers and haberdashers 1894–95 with Evans.
