= Listed buildings in Nottingham (St Ann's ward) =

St Ann's ward is an electoral ward in the city of Nottingham, England. The ward contains 45 listed buildings that are recorded in the National Heritage List for England. All the listed buildings are designated at Grade II, the lowest of the three grades, which is applied to "buildings of national importance and special interest". The ward is to the north and northeast of the city centre, and is partly commercial and partly residential, with some industrial heritage. The listed buildings include houses, offices, shops and associated structures, former lace factories, churches, public houses, schools, an allotment shed, a monument to a boxer, civic buildings, a clock tower, and a former bus garage.

== Buildings ==
Name and location	Photograph	Date	Notes
52 and 54 Upper Parliament Street; 52.95519°N 1.15020°W		c. 1700	Two houses, later shops, they are rendered and have a tile roof. There are two storeys and attics, and two bays. In the ground floor are two shop fronts, the left one dating from the late 20th century, and that on the right from the late 19th century. In the upper floor are four sash windows, and above are two large shouldered through-eaves dormers with brick coping.
6, 8, 10 and 10A King's Walk and 9 Forman Street; 52.95549°N 1.14947°W	—	c. 1800	A row of shops and offices in red brick with stone dressings and slate roofs. There are three storeys and attics, and the King's Walk front has seven bays, sill bands, and a modillion cornice. In the ground floor are shop fronts and a doorway with a fanlight, the upper floors contain sash windows with wedge lintels and keystones, and in the attics are four segmental-arched box dormers. On the Forman Street front is a single bay, with a shop front, a sash window and three blank windows above, all with wedge lintels and keystones, and a pedimented gable containing a pedimented casement window.
Bath Inn Public House; 52.95539°N 1.13781°W		c. 1820	The public house is on an acute-angled corner site, and it was refronted in about 1920. It is stuccoed, the pub fronts are in faience, and there is an eaves cornice and hipped slate roofs. There are two storeys and fronts of four and three bays, and a rebated rounded corner. The pub fronts have a plinth and a decorative cornice, and the windows have mullions and transoms. The doorway on Handel Street has half-columns and side lights in a recess with quarter-columns, and the doorway on Robin Hood Street has quarter columns. The bays in the upper floors are divided by Egyptian pilasters, and the windows are casements.
William Booth Memorial Social Centre; 52.95223°N 1.13172°W		c. 1820	Three houses combined into a museum in 1971, incorporating the birthplace of William Booth. It is in red brick on a rendered plinth, with painted stone dressings, a sill band, an eaves cornice and slate roofs. There are three storeys and three bays. The doorways have round-arched heads and double keystones, and the windows are sashes with wedge lintels and double keystones.
Former lace factory 52.96001°N 1.15026°W		c. 1825	A front range was added to the factory in about 1890, which is in red brick on a rendered plinth with slate roofs. The original factory has five storeys and eight bays. The windows are casements, almost continuous in the top floor. The front range has four storeys and eight bays, with elaborate moulded terracotta ornament. In the ground floor is a segmental-headed cart entrance and shop fronts, and the upper floors contain sash windows.
Langtry's Public House; 52.95531°N 1.15068°W		Early 19th century	The public house, on a corner site, is stuccoed, on a plinth, with a ramped cornice on the ground floor, moulded eaves, and a hipped artificial slate roof. There are two storeys and fronts of three bays. The windows are sashes with moulded surrounds. On the front is a doorway with pilasters, and a dummy parapet with ball finials.
69, 69A and 71 Mansfield Road; 52.96016°N 1.15019°W		c. 1830	A house, later two shops and flats, in red brick with a slate mansard roof. There are three storeys and attics, and three bays. In the centre is a doorway, on its left is a late 19th-century shop front with round-cornered plate glass windows and a recessed doorway, and to the right is a 20th-century shop front. The upper floors contain sash windows with flat brick arches, and in the attic are three raking dormers.
96 to 108 Mansfield Road; 52.96081°N 1.14999°W		c. 1840	A terrace of houses, later offices and a shop, in red brick on a plinth, with painted stucco dressings, sill bands, a rendered coped parapet and slate roofs. There are three storeys and 15 bays, the end bays projecting, and the left corner rounded. The doorways have moulded stuccoed surrounds and flat hoods on brackets, and most of the windows are sashes with wedge lintels. The left corner contains a recessed angled doorway flanked by shop windows with pilasters and a cornice on scroll brackets.
110 to 138 Mansfield Road; 52.96148°N 1.15030°W		c. 1840	A terrace of 14 houses, later offices, in red brick on a plinth, with painted stucco dressings, sill bands, a rendered coped parapet, and slate roofs. There are three storeys and 28 bays, and most of the windows are sashes with wedge lintels. In the centre and at the ends are projecting pavilions containing paired stucco doorways with flat hoods on brackets, flanked by canted bay windows with dentilled eaves. At the south end is an addition set at right angles, with three storeys and attics and three bays, a pedimented gable, and a two-storey canted bay window.
107 to 125 Mansfield Road; 52.96123°N 1.15078°W		c. 1845	A terrace of ten shops and houses in red brick with brick dressings and slate roofs. There are three storeys and ten bays, and on the left is a rounded corner. In the ground floor are shop fronts, two with cornices, and the upper floors contain sash windows, those in the middle floor with cast iron balconies.
Golden Fleece Public House; 52.96089°N 1.15059°W		c. 1845	The public house is on a corner site, and is in red brick on a glazed brick plinth, with dressings in stone and brick, an impost band, an eaves cornice and a slate roof. There are three storeys, fronts of two bays, and a rounded bay on the corner containing the doorway. In the ground floor are casement windows under a fascia and lamps. Above the doorway is a curved window, the windows on the front in the middle bay have cast iron balconies, and all the windows have flat brick arches.
13 to 19 Mansfield Road; 52.95808°N 1.14924°W	—	c. 1850	A row of four houses, later houses and shops, in red brick with stone dressings, a sill band, an eaves band, and slate roofs. There are three storeys and four bays. In the ground floor are shop fronts, and the upper floors contain sash windows, those in the middle floor with wedge lintels.
12 Shakespeare Street and railings 52.95760°N 1.14977°W		c. 1850	A house, later offices, in red brick on a plinth, with stucco dressings, quoins, sill bands and a hipped slate roof. There are three storeys and three bays, and the windows are sashes with projecting surrounds. Steps lead up to the central round-arched doorway that has a keystone, decorated spandrels, and a flat hood on brackets. To the right is a window with a hood, and to the left is a canted bay window with a dentilled cornice. The windows in the middle floor have pediments on brackets. In front are two lengths of cast iron railing on a chamfered stone plinth.
Former Adult Education Centre and railings 52.95764°N 1.15003°W		c. 1850	A house, later extended and used for other purposes, in red brick on a plinth, with stone dressings, quoins, a sill band, an entablature and a blocking course. There are three storeys and seven bays, the middle three bays projecting. In the centre is an Ionic portico with two columns in antis and a dentilled pediment. The ground floor is rusticated, and contains an elliptical-arched doorway with a fanlight, a keystone and a crest, above which is a pedimented window. In the flanking bays are narrow round-arched windows, and the outer bays contain sash windows. In front of the outer bays are cast iron railings on a chamfered stone plinth. The extension to the left consists of a square two-stage tower with a pyramidal roof.
Oldknows Factory; 52.96346°N 1.14972°W		c. 1850	A former lace factory complex, in brick with stone dressings, parapets and slate roofs. It consists of two linked factory ranges and a separate ancillary building, later used for other purposes. The Egerton Street factory has four storeys and a basement, an L-shaped plan with ranges of 18 and five bays. In the centre is a cart entrance, over which is a clock. The St Ann's Hill Road factory is in four and five storeys with basements, and has 29 bays, an acute corner with curved brickwork, and a five-bay extension. At the rear of both factories is a pentagonal stair tower. To the rear is a former warehouse with three storeys and six bays, containing casement windows with wedge lintels.
Peacock Public House; 52.95796°N 1.14921°W		c. 1850	A public house on a corner site in red brick, the ground floor rendered, on a plinth, with painted stone dressings, a sill band, moulded eaves, and a slate roof. There are three storeys, fronts of three and two bays and a rounded bay on the corner. The windows in the upper floors are sashes, those on the middle floor with wedge lintels. In the corner bay is a blocked doorway with a rounded cornice on splayed brackets, and above are windows with moulded surrounds. The doorway has pilasters and a fanlight, and the ground floor windows are casements with wooden transoms and stone shafts.
International Community Centre and walls 52.95961°N 1.15047°W		1852	Originally a Bluecoat school designed by T. C. Hine and later used for other purposes, it is in red brick with a stone basement, on a plinth, with stone dressings, and slate roofs with tile crests and coped gables with kneelers. There are two storeys, a basement and attics and an L-shaped plan, with fronts of five bays. Most of the windows are casements with mullions, transoms and cornices. The right bay of the entrance front projects and has a gable with a quatrefoil, and on the angles are niches, each containing a statue depicting a girl and boy in school dress. To the left, the middle and end bays project, and the bays between have doorways with mullioned fanlights. In the right return is a bay with a shaped gable containing a clock, and a niche with a cornice containing the date and an inscription. In the angle is the base of a square bell turret. At the front are curved balustrade stone walls with stepped chamfered coping.
Town Mission Ragged School, wall and railings 52.95464°N 1.13856°W		1858	The school, later used for other purposes, is in stone on a plinth, with dressings in red, white and blue, and a tile roof with diapering and coped gables. There is a single range with wings and additions, making an H-shaped plan. The main range has a single storey, four bays, and four large gabled dormers. Most of the windows have round arches, mullions and transoms, and polychrome brick heads, and in the roof are four gablet ventilators. At the rear is a shouldered chimney stack, corbelled out, with an inscribed and dated ribbon. The boundary and retaining walls are in stone with a spiked railing, and contain square gate piers with pyramidal caps.
1 to 19 Campbell Grove; 52.95725°N 1.13883°W	—	c. 1860	A terrace of 19 houses and a shop, in red brick, with brick dressings, cogged eaves and slate roofs. There are three storeys and 19 bays. The windows are sashes with brick round heads and flat arches. On the east corner is an altered shop front.
24 to 38 Campbell Grove; 52.95740°N 1.13863°W		c. 1860	A terrace of 15 houses and a shop, in red brick, with brick dressings, cogged eaves and slate roofs. There are three storeys and 15 bays. The windows are sashes with brick round heads and flat arches. At the east end is a shop with a corner door flanked by shop windows under a wooden cornice.
59 Mansfield Road; 52.95930°N 1.14978°W		c. 1860	A shop with living accommodation, later used for other purposes, in red brick, with painted stone dressings, a moulded cornice, a brick parapet and a slate roof. There are three storeys and two bays. In the ground floor is an original shop front with pilasters, an entablature, and a doorway with a fanlight, and the upper floors contain sash windows with painted stone wedge lintels. Inside are original fittings, including a former bakery in the basement, and a refreshment room at the rear with a clerestory roof.
1 to 20 Robin Hood Terrace; 52.95741°N 1.13944°W		c. 1860	A terrace of 20 houses in red brick, with brick dressings, cogged eaves and slate roofs. There are three storeys and 20 bays. The doorways have round brick arches, and the windows are sashes with flat arches. The houses are arranged in symmetrical pairs, each with a single window and a side door.
1 to 30 The Promenade; 52.95700°N 1.13850°W		c. 1860	A terrace of 30 houses in painted brick, with dressings in stone and stucco and slate roofs. There are three storeys, stepped up a hill. Most houses have three bays with blank centre windows and alternating stucco doorcases with round heads or cornices on brackets. At the west end is a canted bay window. The east end has a corner block with two storeys and three bays, and two-storey canted bay windows.
5 to 11 King's Walk; 52.95547°N 1.14927°W	—	c. 1860	A row of shops and offices in red brick with stone dressings and slate roofs. The right block has two storeys and four bays, three shop fronts, a round-arched doorway with a rusticated surround, and sash windows. On the corner is a curved block with three bays and an original shop front. Above are three windows, and a parapet with a central inscribed pediment.
St. Matthias' Church; 52.95815°N 1.12977°W		1867–68	The church was designed by Hine and Evans, and the chancel was rebuilt in about 1950 following war damage. It is built in Bulwell stone with bands in blue lias limestone and slate roofs. The church consists of a nave with a clerestory, vestigial aisles and transepts, a south porch, a chancel, an apse with a conical roof, a vestry and an organ chamber. At the west end is a round-arched doorway, above which is a triple-lancet window, a round window, and a gabled bellcote with three openings.
Railing and gateway, St. Matthias' Church; 52.95805°N 1.13024°W	—	1867–68	Flanking the entrance to the churchyard is a pair of square gate piers in Bulwell stone with plinths and pyramidal caps, and a pair of spiked gates. Outside these are stepped low walls with chamfered coping and a spiked railing, extending for about 40 metres (130 ft).
Shed, Hungerhill Gardens Allotments; 52.96851°N 1.13355°W	—	Late 19th century	The allotment shed is weatherboarded with a Welsh slate roof. There is a single storey and a central doorway, flanked by two-light casement windows. The side gables have decorative bargeboards with finials, and the front eaves also has a decorated board.
Park View Court and wall 52.95578°N 1.13909°W		1876	A block of flats designed by Bakewell and Bromley, it is in red brick on a plinth with dressings in grey and blue brick and stone, string courses, a cornice, a central parapet with a datestone, and slate roofs. There are four storeys and attics, and a U-shaped plan around a courtyard, with fronts of ten and seven bays. The windows in the first floor have round-arched polychrome heads, and those above have segmental heads. Flanking the middle four bays is a staircase bay with double pointed-arched openings containing open landings and stairs, and outside these are square turrets with pyramidal spires. Across the front of the block is a boundary wall in brick with chamfered stone coping and square piers with pyramidal caps.
Gates, railings and boundary walls, Arkwright Building; 52.95772°N 1.15210°W		1877–90	The structures were designed by Lockwood and Mawson. Partly enclosing the grounds is a low stone boundary wall with chamfered coping and square pedestals on plinths, on which is a single rail on cast iron stanchions. In the centre are two pairs of ornamental wrought iron gates with iron intermediate piers and octagonal stone end piers with spire tops.
Bendigo Monument; 52.95651°N 1.14089°W		1880	The monument is in St Mary's Rest Garden, a former cemetery. It commemorates William Thompson, also known as Bendigo, a professional bare-knuckle boxer. The monument consists of a statue in white marble depicting a recumbent lion on a rock-faced base, holding an inscribed scroll in one paw. The statue is on a rectangular pedestal with an inscription and a moulded plinth.
Guildhall and caves 52.95639°N 1.15070°W		1884–88	The guildhall, on a corner site, was designed by Verity and Hall. It is in Darley Dale stone and brick, with a rusticated ground floor, a dentilled main cornice, an eaves cornice, a parapet with pedestals, and a Westmorland slate roof. There are two storeys, a basement and attics, and fronts of five bays. In the centre of the main front is a three-bay portico with Doric columns, rusticated piers and a balustrade with pedestals and two statues. Above are tripartite windows with Ionic columns in antis, a dormer with a round window, and a pediment containing a sculpture. The outer bays project, forming pavilions with pedimented dormers and pyramidal roofs. The left return has a pedimented centre and a first floor Ionic portico. At the rear is a square five-stage tower with round-arched bell openings and a balustrade. Under the building is a cave system with brick-lined passages and cells.
St Alban's Church, Sneinton; 52.95367°N 1.13574°W		1885–87	The church was designed by Bodley and Garner, with extensions in 1897–98 and 1912. It is built in red brick with stone dressings and slate roofs, and consists of a nave and a chancel under a continuous roof, north and south aisles, a south porch, and a Lady chapel. On the south parapet is a gabled bell turret, the porch has a polychrome gable and a pointed-arched doorway with shafts, and is enclosed by wrought iron railings and a gate. Attached to the church is a single-storey parish room with a Diocletian window.
Former police and fire stations 52.95688°N 1.15106°W		1887–88	The former police and fire stations, later offices, were designed by Verity and Hall. They are in Darley Dale stone on a plinth, with a cornice, a sill band, an eaves cornice, a blocking course with urns, and Westmorland slate roofs with coped gables. The windows are sashes with mullions. There are two blocks, each with two storeys and a basement, and three bays. The police station on the left has a central round-arched doorway and tripartite windows in the outer bays. The fire station has a cart entrance on the left, and on the roof is a domed turret with a finial. On the right return is a square two-storey tower with a balustrade, and a wrought iron overthrow with a lamp bracket.
Woodborough Road Islamic Social Centre; 52.96262°N 1.14605°W		1893–94	A Baptist church designed by Watson Fothergill and later converted for other uses. It is in red brick with a stone basement, dressings in blue and red brick and stone, and tile roofs. The building consists of a main body with a clerestory and an apse, aisles, and a northeast tower. The tower is octagonal, with three stages, gabled in alternate faces towards the upper part with a clock face, an oblong top stage with a hipped roof and iron cresting. At the base is a double doorway with ringed granite shafts and blank fanlights under gables.
The Rose of England Public House; 52.95821°N 1.14876°W		1898	The public house on a corner site was designed by Watson Fothergill, and is in red brick, the top floor timber framed with brick nogging, on a plinth, with dressings in blue brick and stone, an arcaded band to the first floor, string courses, and a tile roof with a crowstepped gable. There are three storeys and attics, and fronts of one and three bays, with an angled bay on the corner. The corner bay has a gabled porch with traceried bargeboards, above which is a clock face, and an octagonal tower with a spire roof and a finial. Most of the windows are cross-casements with mullions and transoms. On the front, the middle floor contains hipped oriel windows, above which is a recessed wooden balcony with a latticework balustrade, and hipped dormers.
Victoria Centre Clock Tower; 52.95730°N 1.14810°W		1898–1900	The clock tower is the only remaining feature of Victoria Railway Station, designed by A. E. Lambert. It is in red brick with stone dressings. The tower has three stages, clasping buttresses, a cornice, and a balustrade with corner turrets and balconies. At the top is a copper-clad dome with four pedimented round-arched windows, a domed cupola, and a wind vane. In the ground floor is a round-arched recess with voussoirs, and a door with a fanlight, a triple keystone and a segmental pediment. Above it is a canted oriel window, and in the top stage on each side is a niche forming a clock dial, with a balcony and a segmental pediment on brackets.
26 and 28 Upper Parliament Street and 1 and 3 King's Walk; 52.95531°N 1.14917°W	—	1901	A shop and offices on a corner site in red brick with stone dressings and slate roofs. There are three storeys and attics, two bays on the front, and four in the left return. In the ground floor are shop fronts in pink granite. On the middle floor on the front are cross-casement windows with decorated elliptical heads and voussoirs. Above are four round-arched windows under a cornice flanked by tourelles with finials, over which is a coped gable with a roundel. The windows in the left return are paired sashes in elliptical-arched recesses. On the corner is an arched overthrow reading "Kings Walk". The shop fronts in the left return have rusticated surrounds, and in the third bay is a round-headed doorway and a wrought iron overthrow with a pendant lamp.
30 Upper Parliament Street and 2 and 4 King's Walk; 52.95526°N 1.14932°W	—	1901	A shop and offices on a corner site in red brick with stone dressings and slate roofs. There are three storeys and attics, one bay on the front, and four in the right return. In the ground floor are shop fronts in pink granite. On the middle floor on the front is a cross-casement window with a decorated elliptical head and voussoirs. Above are two round-arched windows under a cornice flanked by tourelles with finials, over which is a coped gable with a roundel. The shop fronts in the right return have rusticated surrounds, and above are sashes in elliptical-arched recesses.
15 to 25 Milton Street; 52.95566°N 1.14835°W		1902–03	A corner block designed by John Howitt, in red brick, with stone dressings, a ground floor cornice, sill bands, a coped parapet with pedestals and urns, and slate roofs. There are four storeys and attics, and fronts of seven and four bays, and a rounded bay on the corner. The middle three-bay block on Milton Street has coped gables and pedimented finials. In the centre is a doorway with a pediment, to its left is a shop front in pink granite, and to the right and curving round the corner is a stone shop front. Most of the windows are triple sashes with mullions, those in the second floor with small pediments.
Former Blue Bell Public House; 52.95519°N 1.15006°W		1904	The public house, later remodelled, is in red brick with faience in the ground floor, and slate fronts. There are three storeys and attics, and three bays. In the ground floor is green-glazed faience with foliage pilasters, a doorway with a fanlight, and a shell canopy, flanked by segmental-headed cross-mullioned windows. The bays in the upper floors are divided by brown-glazed rusticated half-columns. In the centre of the first floor is a bracket and a dummy bell, flanked by canted oriel windows with brackets and crests, and ogee-headed lights with transoms. The top floor contains segmental-headed windows, and in the attic is a Venetian window with a keystone, over which is a broken segmental pediment with a finial, flanked by a parapet.
William Booth Memorial Halls; 52.95645°N 1.14290°W		1914–15	The hall is in red brick with stone dressings and a slate roof, and has a rectangular plan with an apse at the north end. There is a single storey and eight bays, the bays divided by giant engaged Ionic columns on brick plinths, each with a moulded cornice and dentilled detailing, and above is a balustraded parapet. The entrance at the north end has a round-arched doorway with a rusticated surround, above which is an inscribed plaque. Over this is a square domed tower containing windows with moulded surrounds, pairs of miniature Ionic columns, and segmental pediments.
St Augustine's Church; 52.96467°N 1.14451°W		1921–23	The church was designed by John Sidney Brocklesby, and is built in Darley Dale stone with concrete domes. It consists of a nave with a clerestory, a chancel, a Lady chapel and an arcaded apse. The entrance front has three bays, with a cylindrical tower on the right, and in the centre is a round-arched doorway, above which is a tall round-arched window with pilasters.
YMCA Hostel and shops 52.95754°N 1.14927°W		1937	The building on a corner site was designed by T. Cecil Howitt. It is in yellow brick with red brick diapering, on a slate plinth, with a continuous cornice on the ground floor, and a roof of lead and tile with coped gables. There are three storeys and attics, and fronts of twelve and three bays, with an angled bay on the corner. In the centre is a projecting tower with a hipped roof. The ground floor has vitrolite cladding and it contains shop fronts. In the upper floors are steel-framed casement windows, and in the attics are box dormers.
Former police headquarters and central fire station 52.95736°N 1.15058°W		1938–40	The building has a steel frame, the external walls are faced with Stancliffe stone on brick backing, and the rear walls are in yellow-grey brick with brown brick lining. There is a U-shaped plan, with a courtyard at the south, and there are three ranges. The north and west ranges have three storeys rising to five, over a basement, the entrances are in canted bays, and at the northwest is a tower with a parapet. The east entrance is approached by semicircular steps, the surrounds contain carved motifs of animals and flowers, and above them is a rectangular fanlight. The doorways are flanked by chamfered stone columns with engraved capitals, and above each doorway is a relief sculpture. The north front contains seven appliance bays divided by granite columns.
Former bus garage 52.95704°N 1.14495°W	—	1939	The building is in brick with decorative faience on the front, and a corrugated sheet roof, and is in Moderne style. There are two storeys and a rectangular plan. The front is in three parts, with the centre recessed, and the outer sections with curved corners and a canopy over an entrance between them. The outer sections contained retail units, and in the upper floor are windows with metal frames and transoms.
