= Nottingham Magistrates' Court =

Magistrates' court in Nottingham, England

Coordinates: 52°56′50″N 1°08′58″W

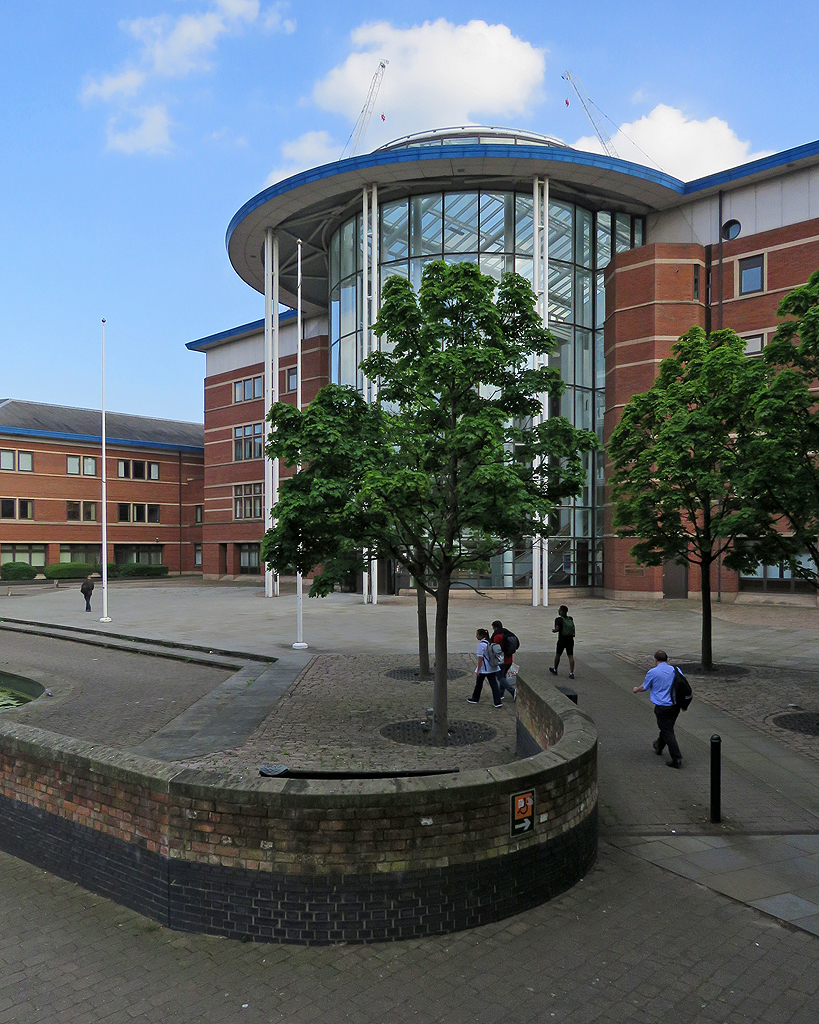
Nottingham Magistrates' Court

Nottingham Magistrates' Court is a magistrates' court in Nottingham, England.

== History ==
Until 1996, Nottingham magistrates were housed in two separate buildings, the Guildhall and the Shire Hall.

In 1996, all magistrates were moved to the new Nottingham Magistrates' Court building, and the old buildings were closed.

The Shire Hall subsequently was converted into the Galleries of Justice. The Nottingham Guildhall was occupied by Nottingham City Council until 2010.

== Description ==
The building was designed by the Nottingham County Council Architect's Department with William Saunders Partnership and Cullen, Carter and Hill. It sits on the site of Nottingham Carrington Street railway station and the gateposts still frame the pathway from Carrington Street to the court.

There are 18 courtrooms in the main block, with six courtrooms in the Youth and Family block.

The complex of buildings also includes the Bridewell Police Station.

The Midland Railway goods shed dating from 1874 was rebuilt to form car parking for the court complex.

== Notable magistrates ==
- Thomas Adams; lace manufacturer (5 February 1807 – 16 May 1873)
- William Frederick Webb; High Sheriff of Nottingham (1829–1899)
- Sir Thomas Birkin, 1st Baronet; lace manufacturer (15 February 1831 – 16 January 1922)
- Sir John Tom McCraith; Conservative and Unionist politician (1847 – 5 December 1919)
- Sir Arthur Black; Liberal Party politician (28 February 1863 – 13 July 1947)
- Sir Albert Ball; former Mayor of Nottingham (20 July 1863 – 27 March 1946)
- Sir Douglas McCraith; Conservative politician (1 January 1878 – 16 September 1952)
- Robert Evans; English architect (11 November 1832 – 19 July 1911)
- Eric Irons; the United Kingdom's first black magistrate (1921–2007)
- Colin Slater; BBC Sports commentator (born 1934)
- Dr Brian Sherratt; political scientist (born 1942)
- Paula Christine Hammond ; British businesswoman (13 March 1944 – 25 March 2017)

== See also ==
- Nottingham Crown Court
