= Oldknow =

Oldknow is a surname. Notable people with the surname include:

- James Oldknow (1873–1944), English cricketer
- Luke Oldknow (born 2001), Zimbabwean cricketer
- Octavius Thomas Oldknow (1786–1854) Mayor of Nottingham
- Samuel Oldknow (1756–1828), English cotton manufacturer
- Emilie Oldknow, COO of Unison and former Labour MP, wife to Jonathan Ashworth

== Other uses ==
- Oldknows Factory, Nottingham, a former lace factory
- in the Children of Green Knowe series of children’s books, the family living in the house is called Oldknow.
