= Nottingham Guildhall =

Building in Nottingham, England

Coordinates: 52°57′23″N 1°9′2.7″W

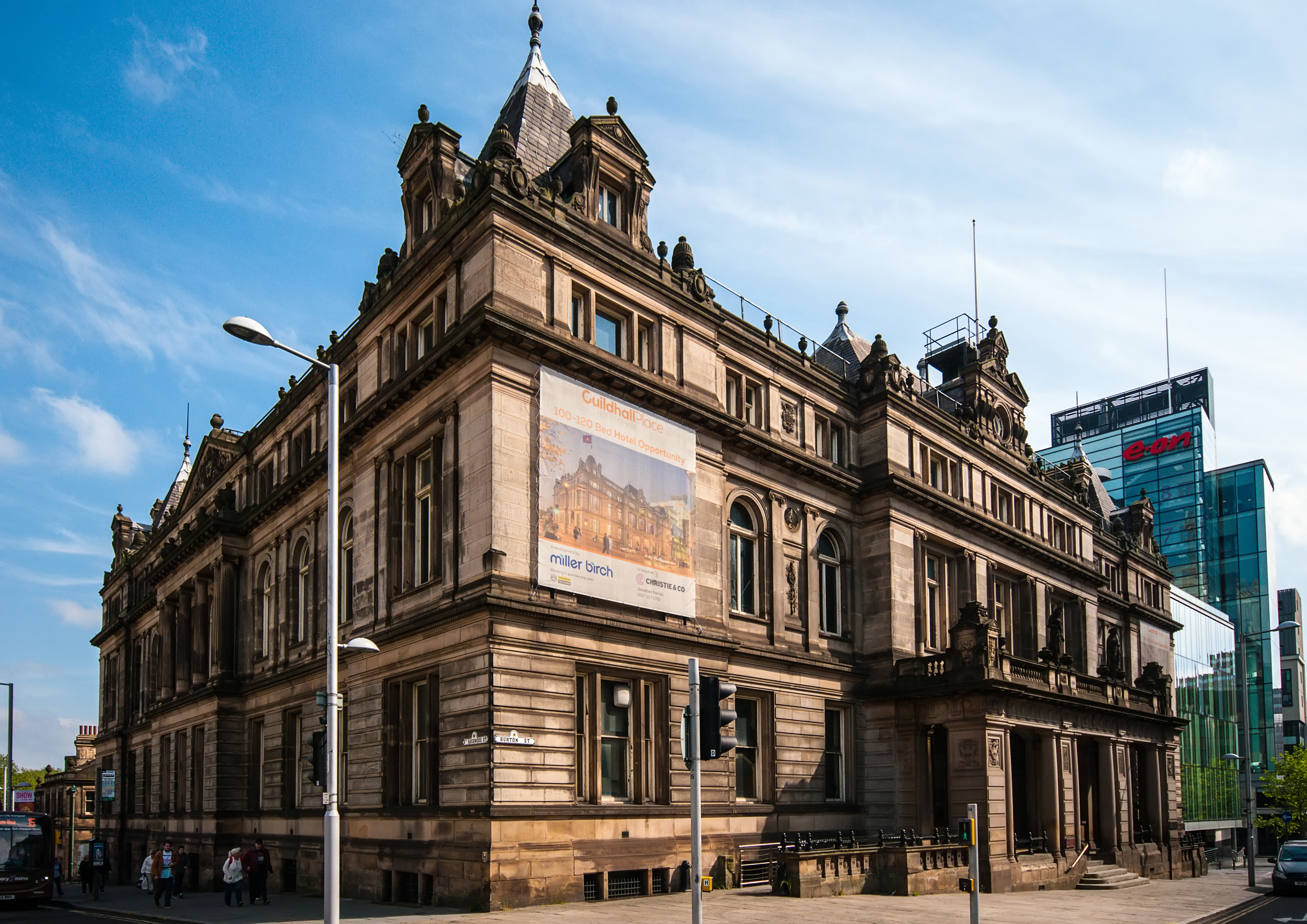

- Location within Nottingham

General information
- Location: Burton Street, Nottingham
- Groundbreaking: 1887
- Completed: 1888
- Cost: £65,000

Design and construction
- Architects: Thomas Verity and George Henry Hunt
- Main contractor: Gabbutts of Liverpool

Listed Building – Grade II
- Official name: Guildhall and associated caves
- Designated: 12 July 1972
- Reference no.: 1246296

Nottingham Guildhall is a former magistrates' court in Nottingham, England. The structure, which was used by Nottingham City Council as offices in the 1990s, is a Grade II listed building.

== History ==
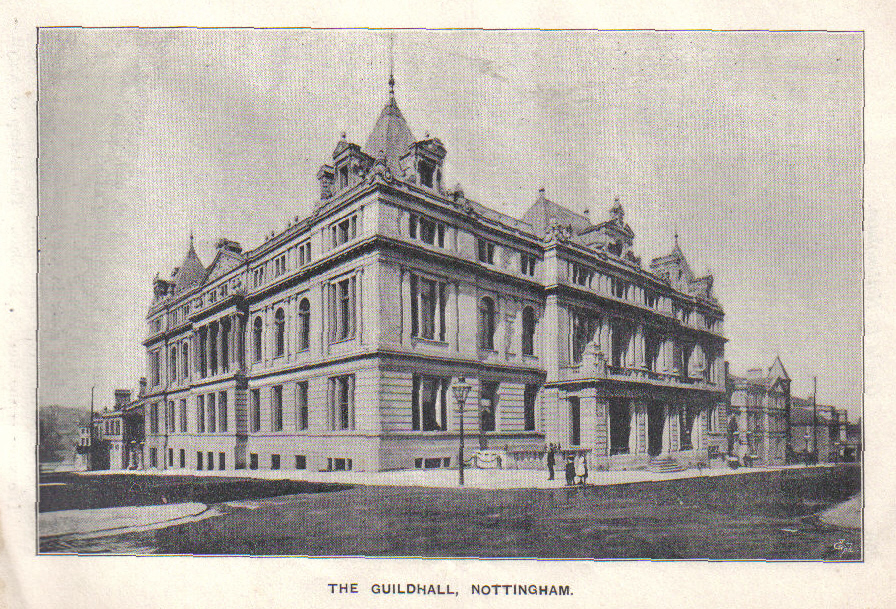
Nottingham Guildhall from the Illustrated Guide to the Church Congress 1897

Nottingham Guildhall was built in 1887 to 1888 to replace the previous Nottingham Guild Hall on Weekday Cross. Following a competition with Alfred Waterhouse as the judge, the French Renaissance Revival design by the architects Thomas Verity and George Henry Hunt was chosen. Gabbutts of Liverpool were chosen as contractors much to the annoyance of local building companies. The initial estimate for the building was £128,416 (equivalent to £13,500,019 in 2025), and immediately the council asked Verity and Hunt to simplify the design. The building was erected in Darley Dale ashlar and brick, with Westmorland slate roofs for a cost of £65,000 (equivalent to £7,304,530 in 2025) and completed in 1888.

In 1996, all magistrates were moved to the new Nottingham Magistrates' Court building. Between 1996 and 2010 the Guildhall was occupied by Nottingham City Council. In 2010 the council left for new, modern offices at Loxley House, close to Nottingham rail station. Since this date the building has remained council-owned but is relatively unused. In 2016, the council initiated discussions with a developer with a view to selling the property.

Between May and July 2024, vandals set fire to the guildhall several times. Security at the site has since been increased.

== Caves ==
The two-level cave system is reached by an open well stair. The brick-lined passages and cells were extensively modified during World War II for use as emergency headquarters and air raid shelters.

== See also ==
- Listed buildings in Nottingham (St Ann's ward)
- Nottingham Magistrates' Court
