= Boulevard Works =

Building in Nottingham, England

Coordinates: 52°57′36″N 1°10′37″W

Boulevard Works, Radford, Nottingham
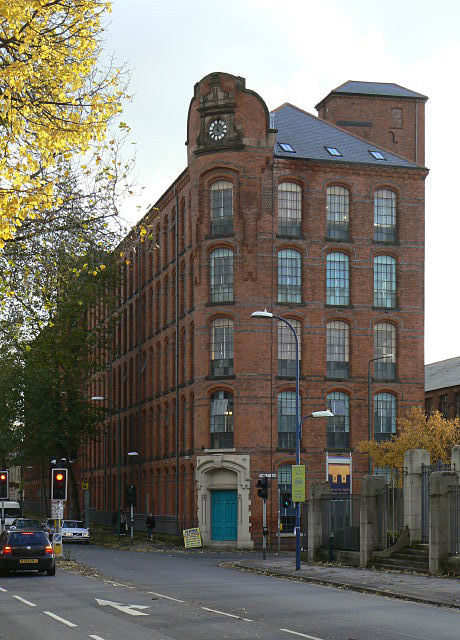
- Boulevard Works

- Location within Nottinghamshire

General information
- Location: Radford Boulevard, Radford, Nottingham

Design and construction
- Designations: Grade II listed

Boulevard Works is a Grade II listed building on Radford Boulevard, Nottingham.

== History ==
Boulevard Works is the largest surviving tenement lace factory in Nottingham, dating from 1883. It was built for George Henry Perry and Sons and comprises a 5 storey building, plus basement and attic. It had capacity for 234 standings of Levers lace making machines.

In 1894, Perry purchased the clock from the Nottingham Guild Hall for £9 (equivalent to £1,011 in 2025) with the intention of installing it in the boulevard works.

The building was extended in 1896 to the west with an addition by Lawrence Bright. This addition was used for the manufacture of curtain lace.

In 1945 the building was converted from steam power to electrical power. From the circa 1963 to the 1990s it was occupied by Marathon Knitwear. Following industrial use the building was converted into student accommodation and is now the Cotton Mills Student Village.
