= E. Wragg & Son =

Pipe organ builder

E. Wragg & Son was a pipe organ builder based in Nottingham that flourished between 1894 and 1969.

== Background ==
Ernest Wragg of Carlton trained with Charles Lloyd in Nottingham and set up as an organ builder himself in 1894 on Carlton Road, Thorneywood. Later the company changed its name when Wragg's son, J. E. Fenton, joined the business as E. Wragg & Son, Organ Builders, and it is under this name that most of the company work is known today.

Ernest Wragg died on 27 March 1949.

Despite Nottingham having at least seven organ builders in the 19th and 20h centuries, E. Wragg and Son were responsible for organs in a large percentage of the churches in the Nottingham area.

The company was acquired by Henry Groves & Son in 1969.

== List of works ==
- St. Matthias' Church, Nottingham 1912
- St Faith's Church, Nottingham
- St. Paul's Church, Carlton-in-the-Willows
- St Alban's Church, Sneinton 1916
- St Christopher's Church, Bare 1934
- St. Cyprian's Church, Sneinton 1935
- Lenton Methodist Church 1939 (relocation)
- Church of St Mary the Virgin, Plumtree (refurbish) 1959
- Church of St Mary and All Saints, Willoughby-on-the-Wolds
- St. Werburgh, Blackwell, Bolsover, rebuild 1967
