= Helena Brownsword Dowson =

British politician and suffragist

Helena (Nellie) Brownsword Dowson
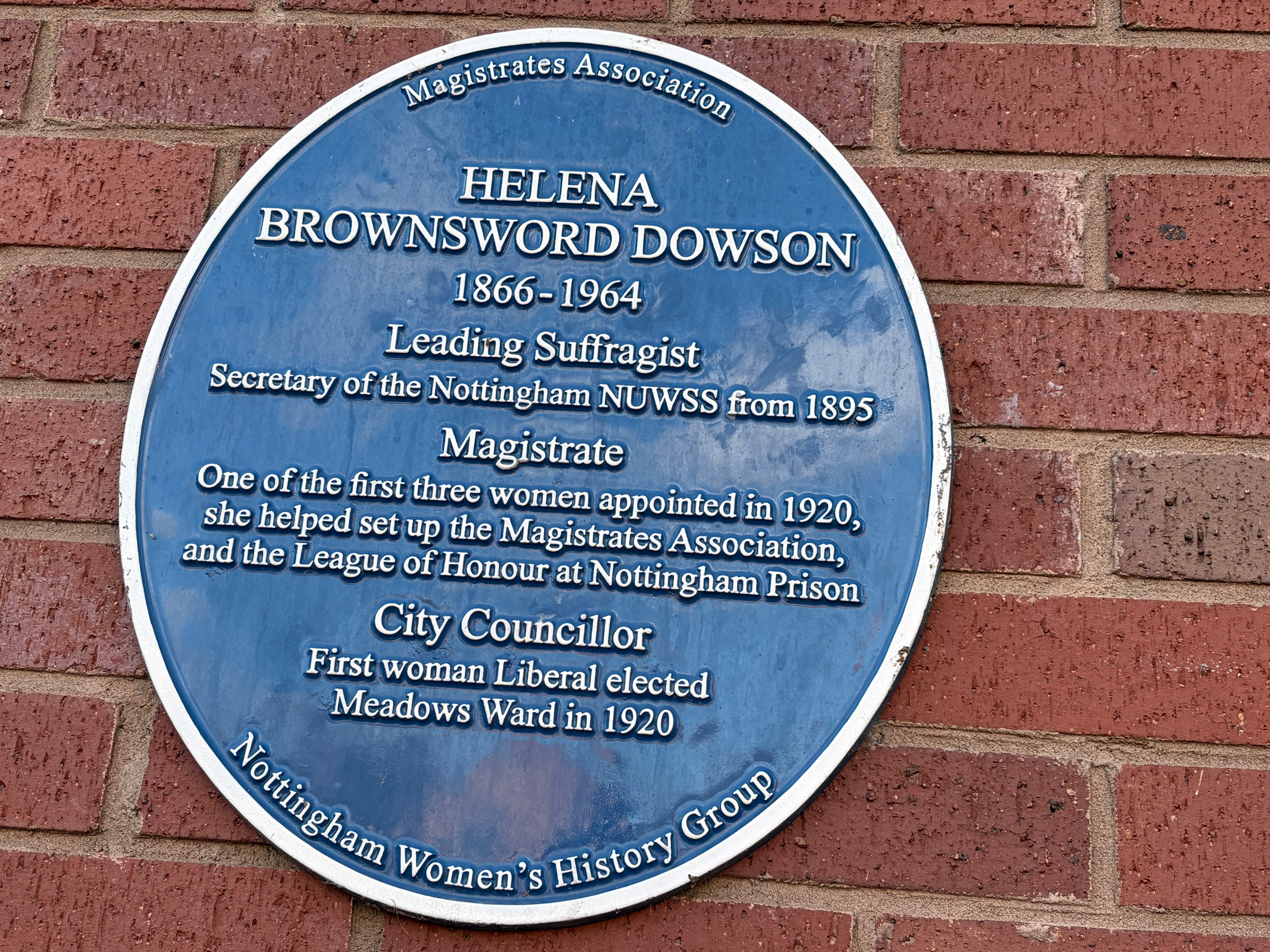
- Born: Helena Brownsword; 23 November 1866
- Died: 26 September 1964 (aged 97)
- Monuments: A plaque - first Liberal woman Councillor on the Council House, Nottingham. A plaque - one of the first 3 JP’s at the Magistrates Court Nottingham. A blue plaque celebrates all of her achievements, Nottingham Justice Centre.
- Title: Justice of the Peace Councillor
- Political party: Liberal
- Relatives: Alice Dowson (Mother in Law) Leading suffragist

Helena Brownsword Dowson (1866 – 1964) was a leading suffragist, city councillor and magistrate in Nottingham.

== Early life ==
Helena (Nellie) Brownsword was born 23 November 1866 in Nottingham, the only daughter of Alderman Anderson Brownsword and Jane Brownsword (nee Walker) who were both committed to women’s suffrage. The Brownswords were a Unitarian family aligned with the Nottingham Liberal Party. She married William Enfield Dowson (1894), whose family were also liberal, non-conformist Unitarians, and suffragists. Further proof of the Dowson family’s allegiance to women’s enfranchisement was that nearly all members attended a Nottingham suffrage meeting in April 1908 which was addressed by Christabel Pankhurst. After marriage, Brownsword Dowson lived at ‘Felixstowe’, Clumber Road West, Park Estate, Nottingham.

== Suffragism ==
The Secretaryship of the Nottingham Suffrage Society was originally held by Brownsword Dowson's mother-in-law, Alice Dowson, and both women had previously established the 'Nottingham Women’s Liberal Association' and the local branch of the National Union of Women Workers. It was Brownsword Dowson who affiliated this local suffrage society to the 'National Union of Women Suffragist Society' (NUWSS), she became leader of the Nottingham branch and, with her sisters-in-law (Maud, Hilda and Lina) they were leading members. In 1898, Brownsword Dowson joined the executive committee of the NUWSS and attended those meetings of the executive in London. Brownsword Dowson also organised demonstrations, held garden parties and stalls to fundraise for women in Nottingham and worked in the Nottingham’s Suffrage shop located in Regent’s Chambers at 54 Long Row, Nottingham. In 1913, Brownsword Dowson and her sister in law (Maud Dowson), joined the 'Great Suffrage Pilgrimage' as it passed through Nottingham on route to London; Brownsword Dowson took Millicent Fawcett to speak at Chesterfield and Southwell; they re-joined the Pilgrimage at the final Hyde Park event on 26 July 1913. The high level of suffrage work by Brownsword Dowson was commended by fellow suffragists in Nottingham and she was awarded an illuminated address,

“To mark their appreciation of her services to the cause, the object of which has now been secured, friends of the women's suffrage movement in the city and county yesterday [18th July 1918] presented Mrs. W. E. Dowson, of Nottingham, with two large volumes of Japanese painters, with an illuminated address suitably inscribed, and a bronze statuette entitled “Sorrow.

During the First World War, Brownsword Dowson organised various fundraising and support for women; she was the Honourable Secretary for 'Queen’s Work for Women', a member of the 'Anti-Profiteering' committee, set up two 'Baby Welcomes' and a day nursery at the request of the Ministry of Health.

== Political career ==
Brownsword Dowson became the first female Justice of the Peace (JP) in 1920, inaugurated police court work for women and became Chair and Secretary for that work.

Brownsword Dowson also became the first woman Liberal Councillor in 1920. She was later elected as Vice-Chair of the National Executive of the Liberal Party. She represented the Meadows Ward, Nottingham, campaigning for improved housing and sanitation and the extension of the vote to women over aged 21 years, and for women's access to representation on civic bodies.

== Death and legacy ==
Later Brownsword Dowson also lived in the Lake District and died at home there on 26 September 1964, aged 98. The estate left by Brownsword Dowson was worth £34,863 plus shares and artefacts that were left to various family or friends. A plaque was unveiled on 8 March 2020 at the Council House, Nottingham to honour Brownsword Dowson as the first Liberal woman Councillor, then, on 20 July 2020, another plaque was erected at the Nottingham Magistrate's Court by the Judicial Office with the Nottingham Women's History Group to honour her as one of the first three women JP’s, and the latest blue plaque, to celebrate all of Brownsword Dowson's achievements, was placed alongside the latter in Nottingham, November 2020.
