= Bromley, Cartwright and Waumsley =

Architectural firm in Nottingham, England (1928–1948)

Bromley, Cartwright and Waumsley was an architectural practice based in Nottingham from 1928 to 1948.

== History ==
The practice of Bromley, Cartwright and Waumsley was established in 1928 between Albert Nelson Bromley (1850-1934), Thomas Herbert Waumsley and Thomas Nelson Cartwright. Waumsley had been working for Albert Nelson Bromley for many years before this in the practice of Bromley and Watkins.

In 1948, Cartwright left to join Evans, Cartwright and Woollatt and the partnership was dissolved.

== Works ==
- Boots the Chemist, 156-162 Western Road, Brighton 1928
- Boots the Chemist, Argyle Street/Union Street, Glasgow 1928
- Hospital for Women, Peel Street, Nottingham 1929 with later additions
- Harlow Wood Orthopaedic Hospital, Ravenshead, Nottinghamshire 1929 with later additions
- Martins Bank, Market Place, Derby 1937
- Martins Bank, High Street, Coventry 1937
