= Portland College =

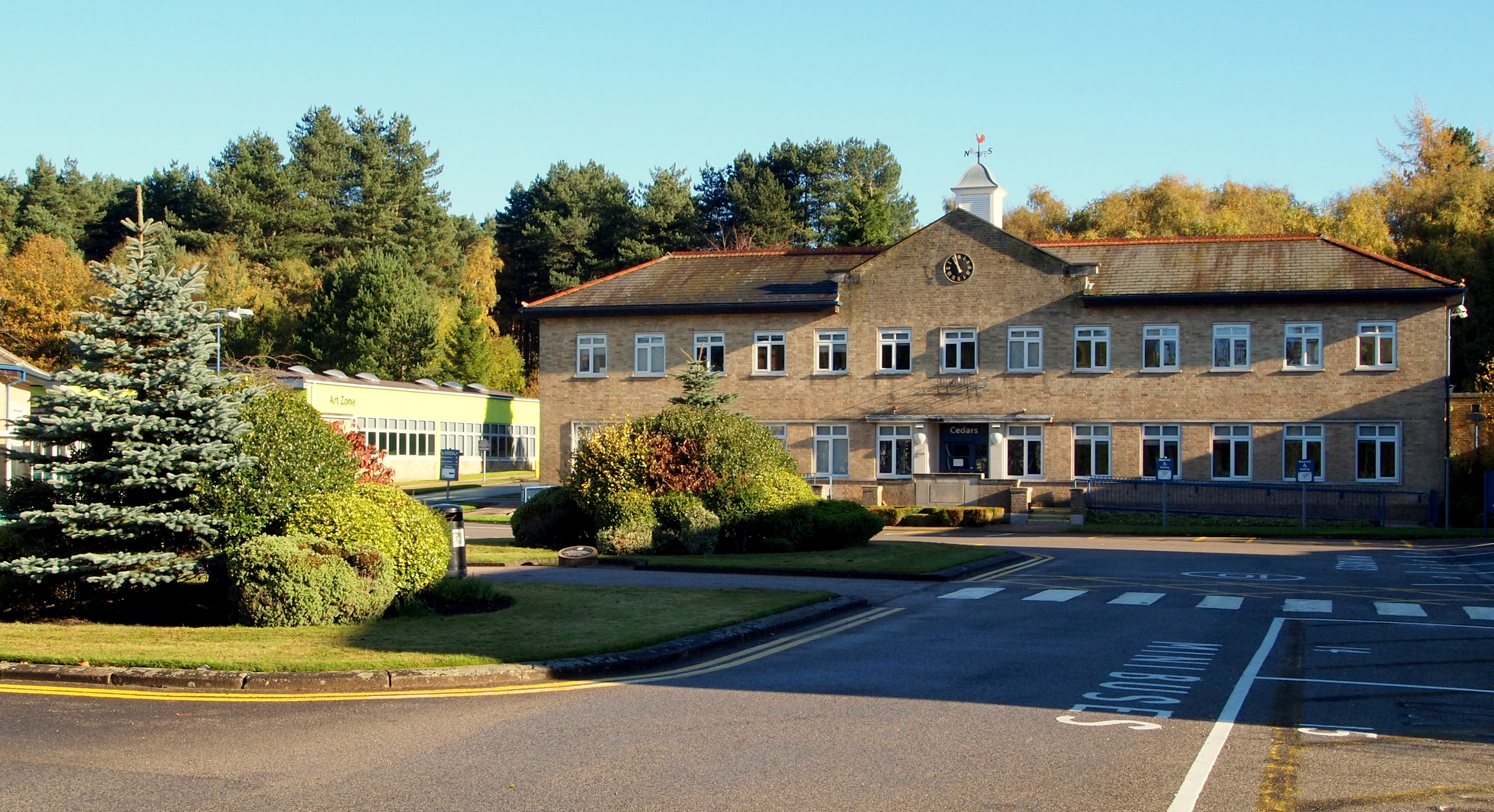

Location
- Nottingham Road; Mansfield, Nottinghamshire, NG18 4TJ; England
- Coordinates: 53°06′20″N 1°10′47″W

Information
- Type: Further Education for the Disabled
- Patron saint: The Queen
- Established: 1949
- Local authority: Nottinghamshire
- Specialist: Life Skills and Vocational Training
- Department for Education URN: 131959 Tables
- Ofsted: Reports
- Chairman: Hugh Matheson
- Principal: Dr Mark Dale
- Gender: Coeducational
- Age: 16 to 60
- Enrolment: 270
- Website: http://www.portland.ac.uk/

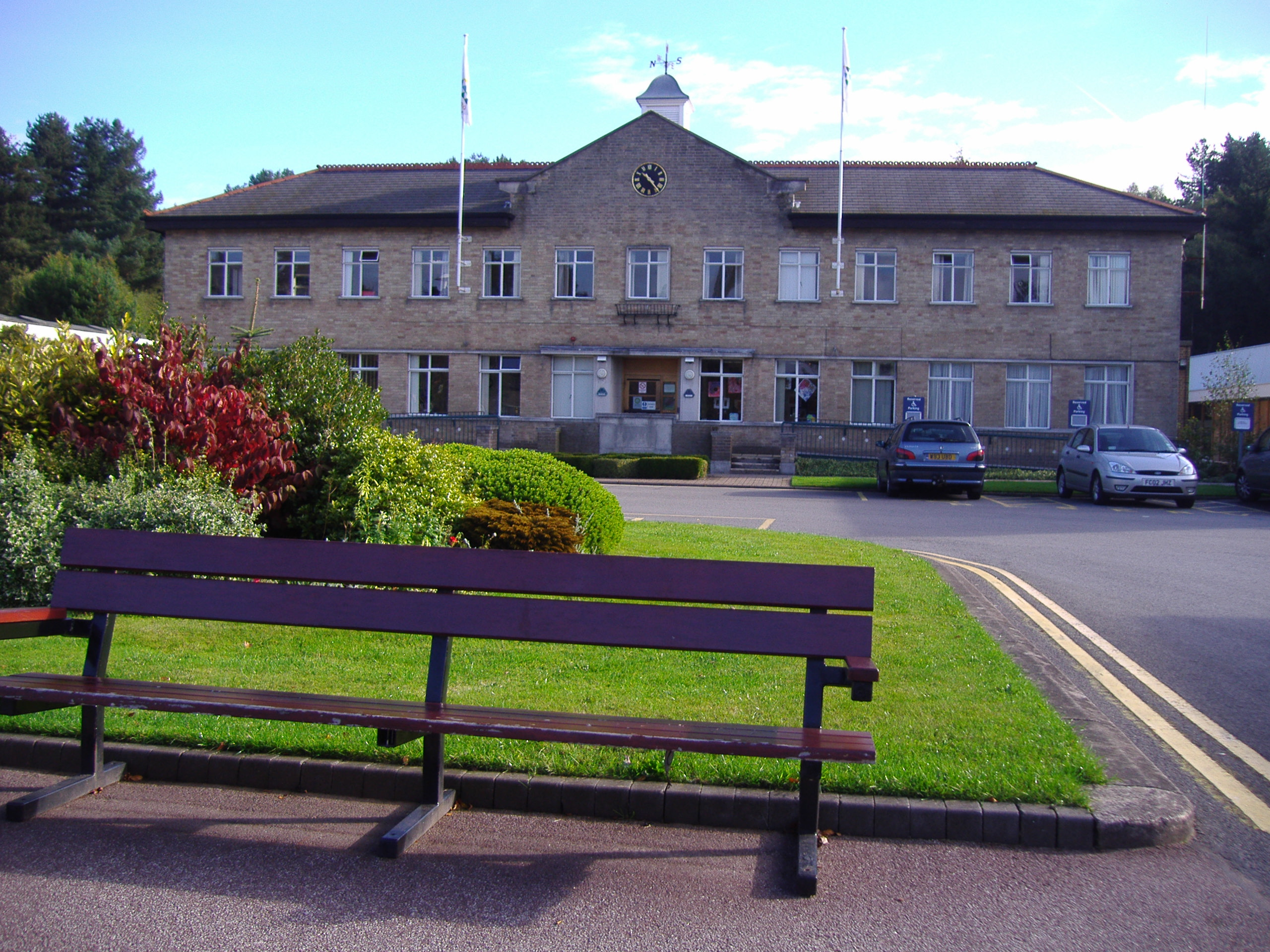
Portland College – main building

Portland College is an education establishment near Ravenshead, Nottinghamshire, England. It is situated in 20 acres (81,000 m^{2}) of Sherwood Forest, approximately 3 miles (4.8 km) south of the town of Mansfield. Portland College has around 270 students, aged between 16 and 60.

== History ==
The college was originally established as an institution for the training of injured men in war and for hurt miners. The college was founded in 1949. Winifred, Duchess of Portland, acts after regular visits to Harlow Wood Hospital near Mansfield in the 1940s, along with Doctor Alan Malkin, an orthopaedic surgeon, to retrain and re-employed patients, after they had recovered and left the hospital.

In 1947, the Duke of Portland transferred 15 acres (61,000 m^{2}) of his land in Sherwood Forest to the Duchess's Charity through a gift. A further 5 acres (20,000 m^{2}) have been purchased for the sighting of the new college. Along with these moves, a Workers Contributory Fund was established that encouraged local Nottinghamshire employees to contribute one penny a week towards the estimated £100,000 required to open the college. In 1948, some 17,000 workers agreed to take part in the scheme and in 1949, a total of 20,000 workers were in the scheme. The foundation stone was laid by the then-Princess Elizabeth on 29 June 1949. By the end of the year, £90,000 (equivalent to £2,750,000 in 2025) had been raised.

The Architect of Portland College was Thomas Nelson Cartwright of Evans, Cartwright and Woollatt.

There were no stairs in the student areas, all doors were wide enough for wheelchairs, and bathrooms and bedrooms were fitted with aids. In the early 1950, two accommodation blocks, a dining hall, workshops and the boiler house, had been completed. Staff for the college had been recruited. In June 1950, the college was opened. On 24 July 1950, Queen Elizabeth officially opened Portland College. The Cinema Museum in London holds Film HM0369 on occasion.

=== 1950 to 1969 ===
The College was able to offer four courses to its 18 students. These were gardening, bench carpentry, boot-and-shoe repair and surgical boot-making, and clerical and commercial. These students included ex-miners and ex-servicemen, and their disabilities range from quiescent tuberculosis and poliomyelitis to limb amputees. In 1953, the Administration Block was opened. It had a working effort with the National Coal Board aimed at the mining communities. In 1961, the first female students enrolled at the college. New courses were introduced, including shorthand and typing, followed by courses in electronic wiring and assembly, and industrial electronics. The college along with the Ministry of Labour, developed a pilot sheltered employment project. Workshops produced their own line of gift local-cut-oak products with the theme of Sherwood Forest and local legendary hero Robin Hood.

=== 1970 to 1989 ===
In the 1970s, the college experienced high unemployment, high inflation and political turmoil. An appeal to raise £80,000 to extend the college's residential provisions was reached. In 1975, the college introduced literacy courses. Don and his wife Jeune invented the Portland Blend System in 1977; the system was marketed under the name 'Phonic Blend Systems Limited'. The college installed computers and micro-writers in classrooms in the 1970s and early 1980s. In 1983, the 5,000th student passed through the college. In 1988, the college opened its Vocational Training Department's Technical Centre, a course in computing.

=== 1990 to the present ===
To celebrate Portland's 40th anniversary, Her Majesty The Queen and the Duke of Edinburgh visited the college in June 1990. The royal party spent the day at the college, presenting awards at the prize-giving, and Elizabeth II also laid the groundwork for a new residential unit, which would eventually be called the 'Laurels'. The Laurels was completed in 1992, which added new accommodation for 60 residential. In the early 1990s, the college's Vocational Department shifted to training based on the National Vocational Qualifications, replacing the traditional examinations. In 1993, funds were raised to build Rowan Place independence units. The college's dining rooms were upgraded and extended. In the College's Golden Jubilee Year, a hydrotherapy pool and fitness centre were added to Portland's campus facilities. In the 1990s, over 8,000 students had passed through Portland College.

In the Learning and Skills Department, Essential Skills Programmes were changed, with the students individually placed into their programmes.

== Information and Communication Technology learning centre ==
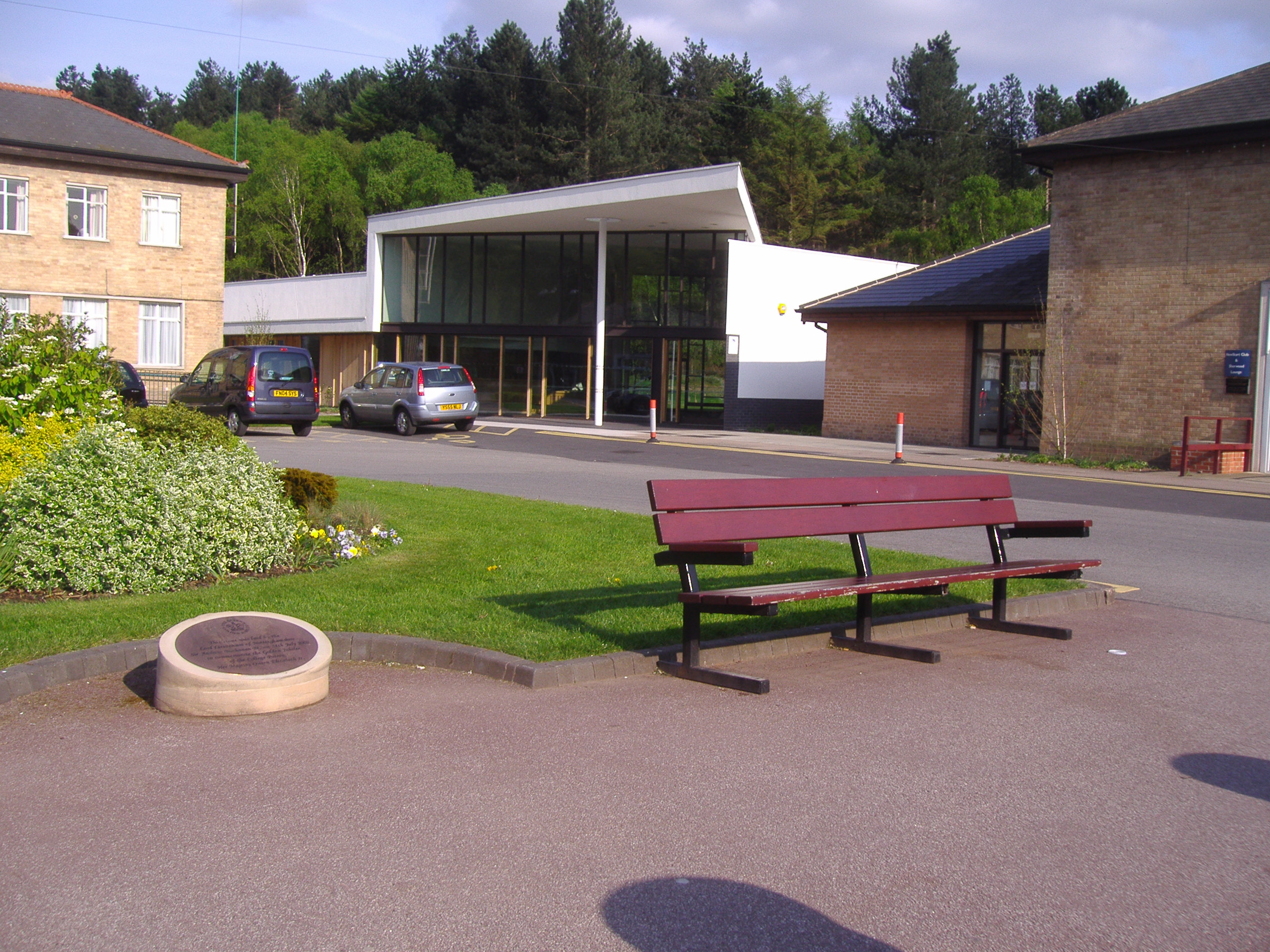
Portland College

In 1997, the college principal, Mike Syms, put together the concept of an Information and Communication Technology learning centre.

In July 2006, the college had reached its fund raising target of £3.2 million and a further £370,000 for equipment and technology. In May 2004, the official ceremony took place; performed by HRH Prince Edward, Earl of Wessex. Just as his mother, the Queen, had laid the foundation stone for the college in 1949, Prince Edward carried out the unveiling of the foundation stone for the new centre almost 60 years later. The buildings architects were Patel Taylor of London. The main construction contract was given to a local company called Clegg Construction of Lace Market in Nottingham. Work commenced in May 2005, and the finished building was handed over in June 2006. The new building has ten teaching spaces. These teaching spaces include the IT Essentials Suite, Computer Aided Design Suite, CISCO and Microsoft Academies, Job Club and Transition Suite, Skills for Life/Learning Resource Suite, Alternative and Augmentative Communication (AAC) Suite, Learning and Skills Information Learning Technology Suite and a Research and Development Centre. There are also various meeting rooms and a new main reception. There are desks with computers, interactive whiteboards and ceiling-mounted projectors in some of the rooms.

== Awards ==
The college won an award for 'Best Local Academy' for the year 2000 in the UK, Europe, Africa and the Middle East. For its work in its Cisco Academy. The Karten Trust provides funds for the college's CTEC centre. In 2003, the college became a Microsoft Office Specialist Authorized Testing Centre, with the Microsoft Academy giving students opportunities for qualifications in the full range of Microsoft Programmes. The number of students at Portland has stabilised in recent years to a level of between 250 and 300 students. With around 30 of these being day students from the surrounding area. The employment students attend the course on a steady roll-on-roll-off basis rather than an academic year.
