= St Alban's Church, Sneinton =

- Church of Our Lady of Perpetual Succour and St Alban
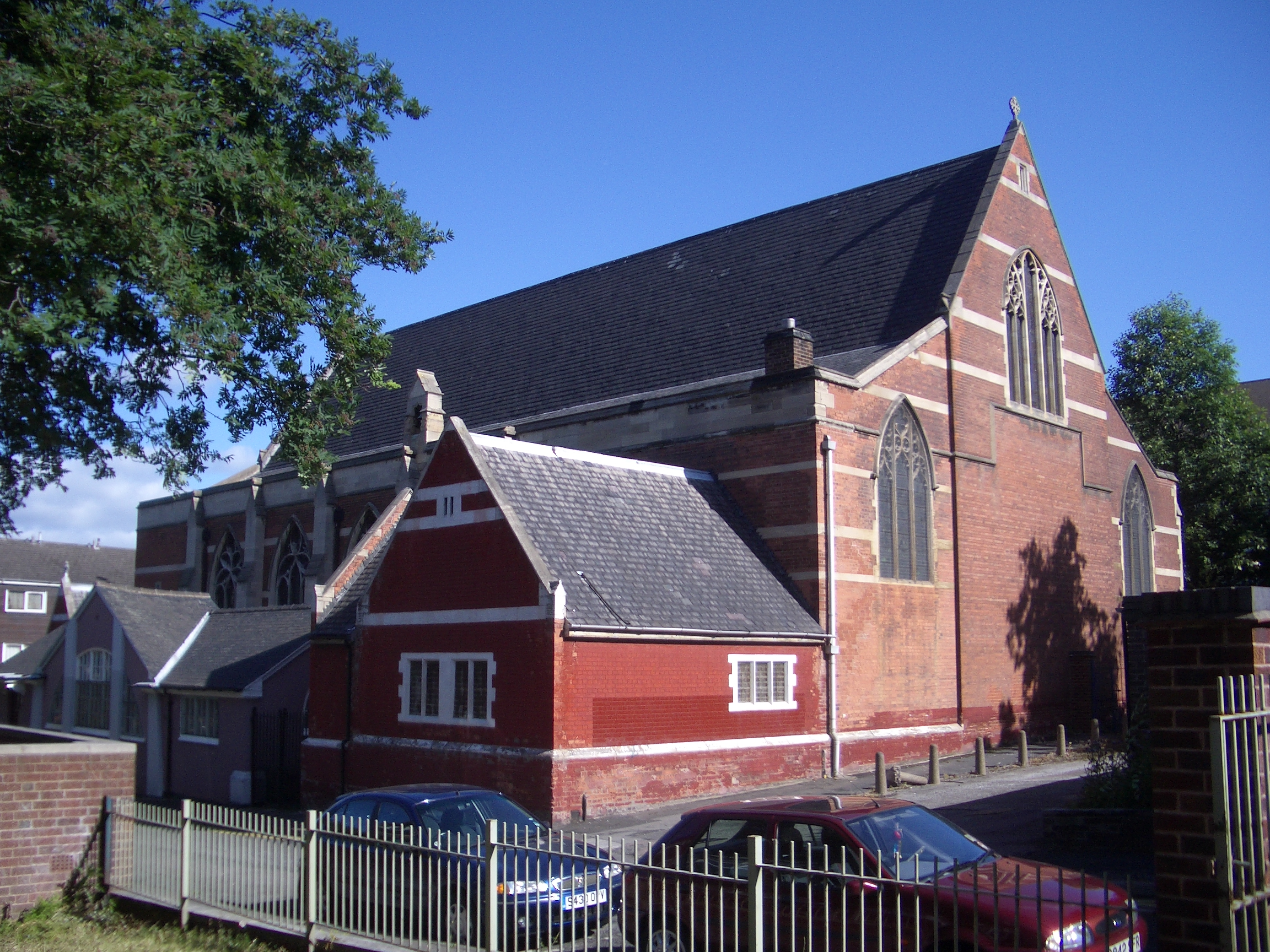
- St Alban's Church, Sneinton

- Location within Nottingham
- 52°57′13″N 1°08′09″W
- Location: Sneinton, Nottingham
- Country: England
- Denomination: Ukrainian Greek Catholic
- Previous denomination: Church of England

History
- Former name: St Alban's parish church
- Dedication: Saint Alban and Our Lady of Perpetual Succour

Architecture
- Architect: George Frederick Bodley
- Style: Gothic Revival
- Groundbreaking: 1886
- Completed: 1887
- Construction cost: £10,447

Specifications
- Capacity: 565
- Materials: red brick, stone

Administration
- Diocese: Ukrainian Catholic Eparchy of the Holy Family of London

St Albans's Church, Sneinton, properly called Our Lady of Perpetual Succour and St Alban, is a Ukrainian Greek Catholic Church in Bond Street, Sneinton, Nottingham, England. It was built in 1888–87 as the Church of England parish church of Saint Alban. In 2003 the Diocese of Southwell and Nottingham declared it redundant and sold it to the Ukrainian Catholic Eparchy of the Holy Family of London, who added the dedication of Our Lady of Perpetual Succour.

== History ==
The Church of England parish was formed from the parishes of St. Stephen's Church, Sneinton, and St. Matthias' Church, Nottingham.

The church was designed by George Frederick Bodley and built at a cost of £10,447 (equivalent to £1,190,000 in 2025),. It is built in brick and stone with a wagon roof, and has a chancel, nave, aisles, south porch, north west turret with 1 bell. There were seats for 565 people.

The foundation stone was laid on Tuesday 9 March 1886 by Rev Canon Vernon Wollaston Hutton. The church was consecrated on Saturday 23 July 1887 by Bishop George Ridding,

A Lady chapel was added in 1898. The south aisle was lengthened and vestries were added in 1912 at a cost of £1,811.

The chancel has an east window commemorating Canon Vernon Wollaston Hutton, who was vicar of St Stephen's parish church, Sneinton 1868–84. The east window cost £200. The screen was the gift of the sons of Thomas and Alice Tew. The Lady Chapel has a reredos that provided by Mrs Bowman-Hart, and an altar in St Michael's chapel is to commemorate Charles Matthews and his son. There is a richly decorated baptismal font. The three windows in the side chapel were installed in 1913, 1915 and 1916.

== Incumbents ==
- F Boag, circa 1894–97
- Francis Charles Finch, 1898–1900
- Kenneth Martin, 1920–31
- Cyril Ernest Hardy 1931–51

== See also ==
- Listed buildings in Nottingham (St Ann's ward)

== Sources ==
- Pevsner, Nikolaus; Williamson, Elizabeth (revision) (1979) [1951]. Nottinghamshire. The Buildings of England (2nd ed.). Harmondsworth: Penguin Books. p. 250. ISBN 0-14-071002-7.
