= Douglas McCraith =

British solicitor (1878–1952)

Sir Douglas McCraith, JP (1 January 1878 – 16 September 1952) was a British solicitor, Conservative local politician and sportsperson from Nottingham.

== Early life ==
McCraith was born on New Year's Day 1878 in Nottingham, the elder son of Sir James William McCraith, a solicitor and prominent Nottingham politician, and his wife, Maria Elizabeth, née Dickinson. After schooling at Harrow, McCraith went up to Trinity College, Cambridge, graduating with a Bachelor of Arts degree in 1899 and taking up his Master of Arts degree in 1903. In 1902, he was admitted a solicitor, and subsequently became a partner in his father's firm Maples and McCraith. He was appointed a justice of the peace in 1928 and President of the Nottingham Incorporated Law Society in 1930, and served as Chairman of the Lord Chancellor's Advisory Committee for Nottingham from 1936 to 1951 and then Chairman of the Nottingham Bench between 1951 and 1952.

== Career ==
Between 1904 and 1930, McCraith served on Nottingham City Council, first as a councillor and, after 1920, as an alderman. During this time, he was chairman of the council's Watch and Estates committees and vice-chairman of its finance committee. Given that his father and uncle, Sir John McCraith, were prominent Unionists, the younger McCraith was a member of the Conservative and Unionist Party and served for thirty years as president of the East Nottingham Conservative Association. In 1938, he became president of the city's Property Owner's Association, and was also president of the Edwalton and Plumtree Conservative Association. In 1939, he was appointed a Knight Bachelor. Between 1941 and 1945, McCraith chaired the Price Regulation Committee for the North Midland Region, and in this capacity, he "sought out and publicised what he considered to be examples of unjustified profiteering", complaining about the perceived shortcomings of the Central Price Regulation Board. His efforts earned him the nicknames "The People's Champion", "The Anti-Racket Chief" and "Racket-Buster No. 1". In 1945, he resigned from his public appointments, owing to pressure from his business interests.

Outside of politics and the law, McCraith was involved in various businesses, as director of the Nottingham Real Estate Company Ltd, the Commercial Union Insurance Company Ltd and the Stoll Theatre Corporation. For over three decades, he was chairman of the Nottinghamshire County Cricket Club, and was its president in 1937; when, during the 'leg-theory' crisis, other clubs threatened to disengage with Nottinghamshire CCC, McCraith managed to iron out relations; he was appointed a life member in 1951. He played cricket for the county's amateurs and enjoyed fly-fishing and golf. In 1929, he published By Dancing Streams, which was followed up with Dancing Streams in Many Lands in 1946.

== Personal life ==
In 1915, McCraith married Phyllis Marguerite, of St John's Wood, London, a daughter of A. D’Ewes Lynam; they had two sons, one of whom, Patrick James Danvers (1916–1998), MC, TD, DL, was also a prominent solicitor and served with distinction in World War II, receiving the Military Cross in 1943; he commanded the Sherwood Rangers Yeomanry between 1953 and 1957 and was High Sheriff of Nottinghamshire in 1963. The elder McCraith last lived at Holme Lodge, Bingham, and died on 16 September 1952.
