= James William McCraith =

Local politician in Nottingham

Sir James William McCraith, JP (19 March 1853 – 9 July 1928) was a local politician who served as the Conservative and Unionist Party Leader in Nottingham.

== Background ==
McCraith was born on 19 March 1853, the second son of William McCraith (d. 1884), of Southwick, Stewarty of Kirkcudbright, an official in the Midland Railway Company, and his wife Sarah (d. 1897), daughter of James York, of Northamptonshire. His elder brother was Sir John Tom McCraith, a prominent Unionist on Nottingham City Council who was knighted for his political service in 1904.

McCraith attended the King's School in Grantham, before he was articled to Samuel Maples, a solicitor; the pair entered into a partnership as Maples and McCraith, which occupied them for the rest of their working lives. McCraith was a founding member of the Nottingham Incorporated Law Society in 1875 and was elected its president in 1891; he became a Justice of the Peace the following year and served as French Vice-Consul for Nottinghamshire, Derbyshire and Leicestershire. He was a long-serving Trustee of the Nottingham Savings Bank.

A staunch supporter of the Conservative and Unionist Party, McCraith became its Leader in Nottingham in 1904, and spent many years working under Sir William Blain's presidency of the Central Nottingham Conservative Association, becoming the Association's chairman in 1910. In this capacity he ran many of the city's Unionist meetings and met the likes of Arthur Balfour, Stanley Baldwin and Winston Churchill. During World War I, he chaired the local Parliamentary Recruiting Committee and in January 1918 he was appointed a Knight Bachelor.

In 1876, McCraith married Marie Elizabeth, daughter of Thomas and Elizabeth Dickinson, of Holly Mount in Nottinghamshire, and had a daughter and three sons: Douglas (1878–1952), who was a solicitor and long-serving City Councillor who received his own knighthood in 1939; Major Bernard McCraith Royal Engineers (1880–1919), who died of pneumonia; Kenneth York; and Violet Muriel. The elder McCraith died at his home in The Park, Nottingham, on 9 July 1928.
