= St Cyprian's Church, Nottingham =

Coordinates: 52°57′52″N 01°06′49″W

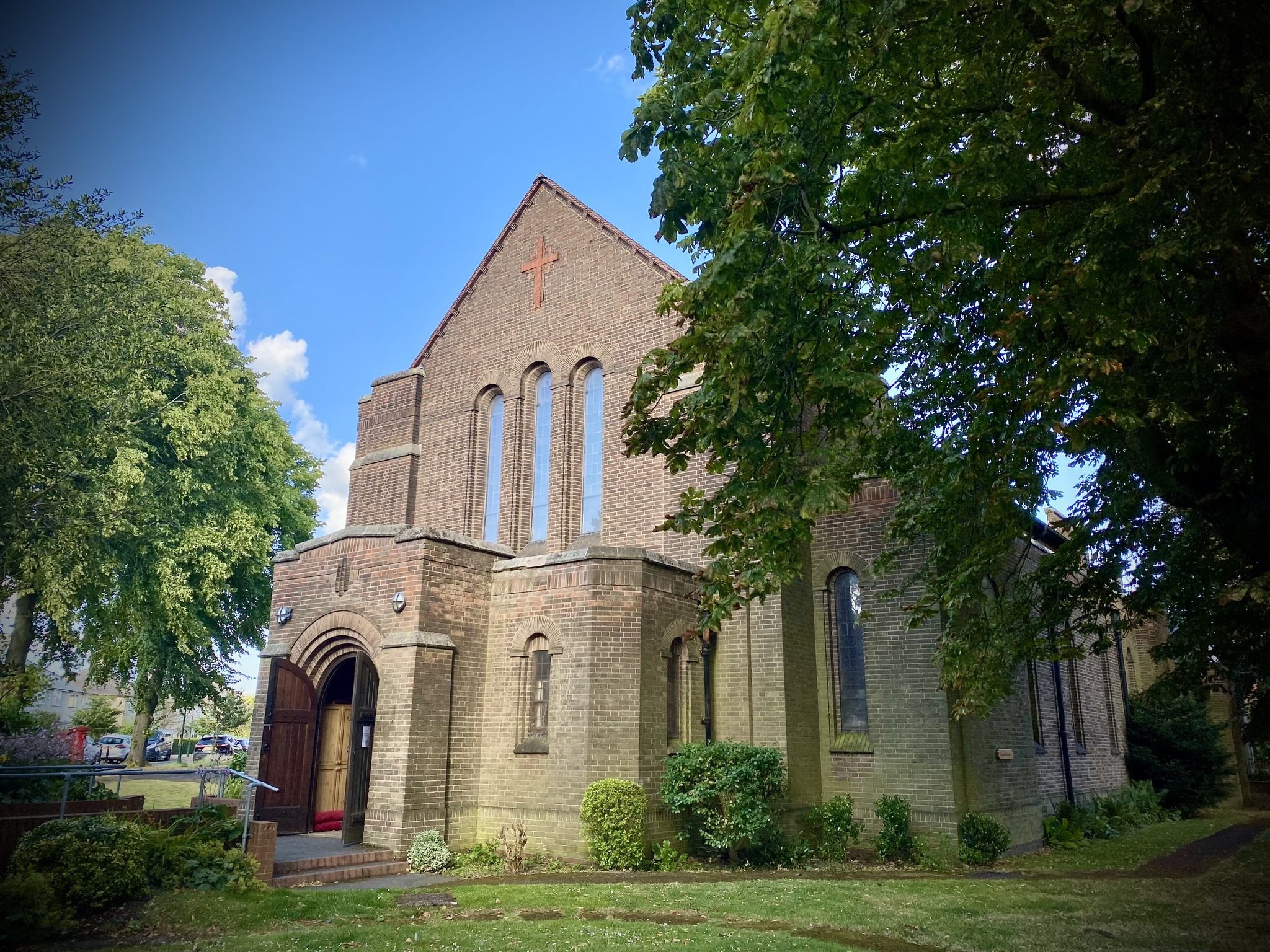
- St Cyprian's Church, Nottingham
- Denomination: Church of England
- Churchmanship: Traditional Catholic
- Website: stcyprian.org.uk

History
- Dedication: St Cyprian

Administration
- Province: York
- Diocese: Southwell and Nottingham

Clergy
- Bishop: Rt Revd Stephen Race (AEO)

St Cyprian's Church is a parish church of the Church of England in Nottingham. The church's historic title of St Cyprian of Carthage, Sneinton, is no longer geographically accurate, the boundaries of Sneinton having evolved in the second half of the twentieth century. The church now serves much of Carlton Hill and Bakersfield areas, with only one very small part of the parish being in Sneinton.

The church's principal service is a Sung Mass at 9.30am on Sundays; full information on the church's activities may be found on their Facebook and A Church Near You webpages.

== History ==
The church was built in 1935 by the architect C.E. Howitt. Construction work started in 1934 and the building was consecrated by Henry Mosley, the Bishop of Southwell on 15 May 1935. The estimated cost was £8,500 (equivalent to £522,660 as of 2025),, most of which came from the Diocese of Southwell from the sale of the site of the former St. Paul's Church, George Street, Nottingham.

The church is in the Diocese of Southwell and Nottingham, and is in the Traditional Catholic tradition. Whilst it plays the fullest possible part in the life of the Diocese, it is under the Episcopal care of the Bishop of Beverley.

=== Medieval Font ===
The font is the oldest item in the church. It is believed to be 13th or 14th Century and was found in a field between Gedling and Shelford. At the time of its discovery it was in use as a horse trough; the damage on the rim of the font is attributed to contact with the horses’ tack.

The font's original location is thought to have been Saxondale chapel, which was part of Shelford Priory. The chapel was demolished in the 15th Century.

When found it found a home in St Michael and All Angels, Foxhall Road (no longer standing). From there it was moved to St Cyprian's old church, and finally to the new building.

== List of Incumbents ==
- The Revd Fr Vincent Travers Macy (1913-1920)
- The Revd Fr C. S. Neale (1920-1927)
- The Revd Fr Francis William Killer (1927-1938)
- The Revd Fr T. Varteg Evans (1938-1961)
- The Revd Fr Ernest James Weil ? (1961-1968)
- The Revd Fr Geoffrey Charles France ? (1968-1988)
- The Revd Fr William John Gull (1990-1999)
- The Revd Fr Kevin Ball (2001-2005)
- The Revd Fr Andrew Waude (2007-2015)
- The Revd Fr Ian McCormack (2024-present), priest-in-charge
- The Revd Fr Lee Dunleavy (2024-present), curate

== Organ ==
The organ was built by E. Wragg & Son and installed in 1935. It incorporated pipework from the organ in St. James' Church, Standard Hill. The specification of the organ can be found on the National Pipe Organ Register.
