= Albert Nelson Bromley =

English architect

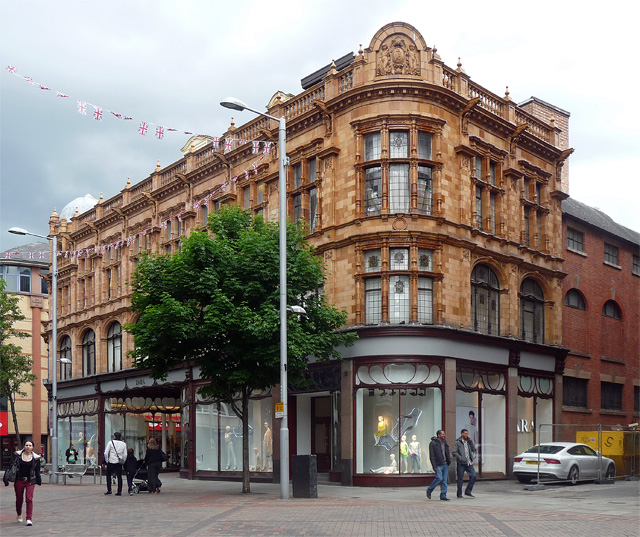
- Boot’s Depot, Pelham Street, Nottingham
- Born: 15 July 1850; Stafford, England
- Died: 16 August 1934. Nottingham
- Education: Mr Shipley’s Academy, Lincoln
- Occupation: Architect
- Practice: Partner with H.G. Watkins 1905-1928 and TJN Cartwright and T.H.Waumsley (1928-34)
- Projects: Design of many shops for Boots of Nottingham

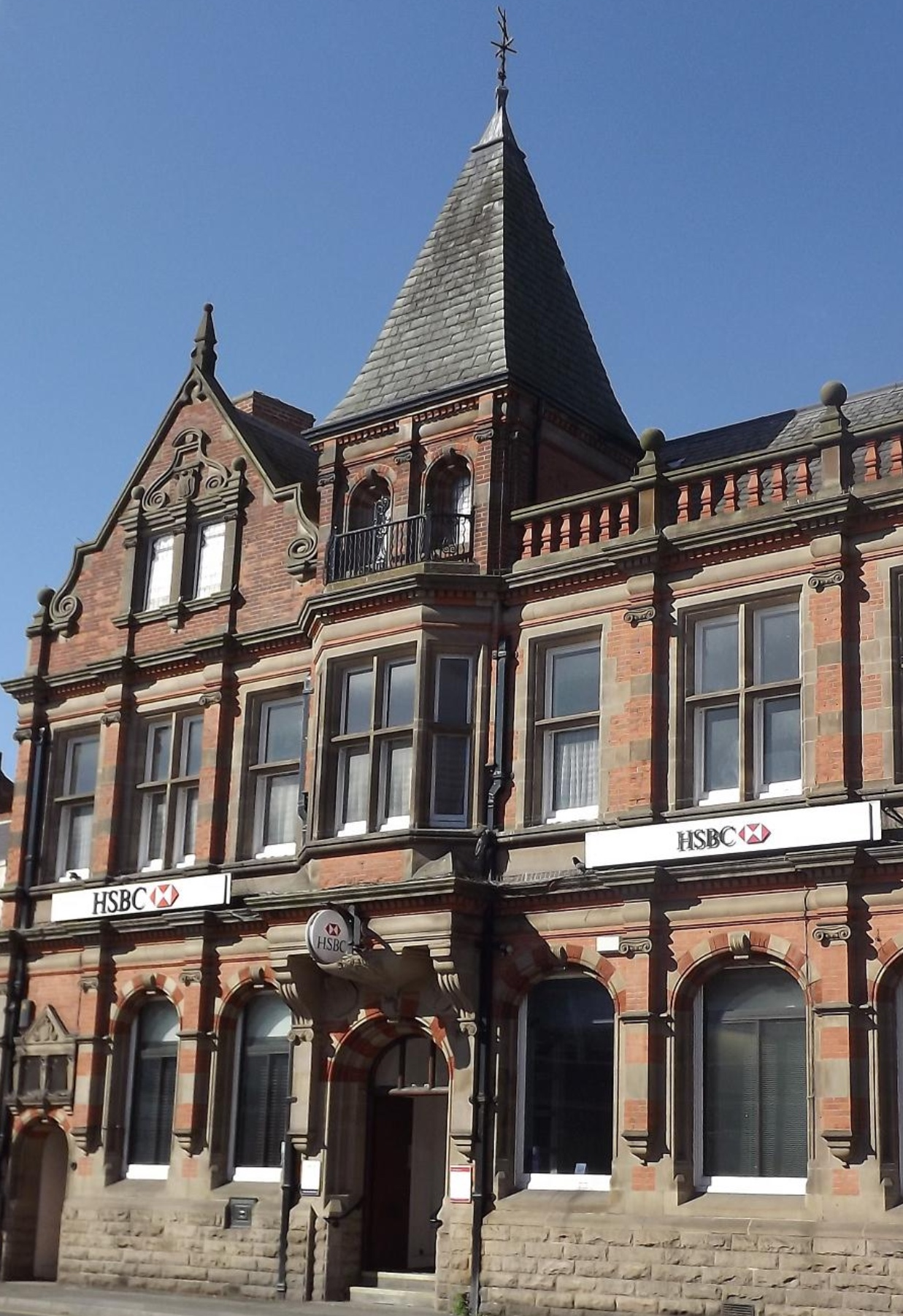
Nottingham Joint Stock Bank, Long Eaton, Derbyshire 1891

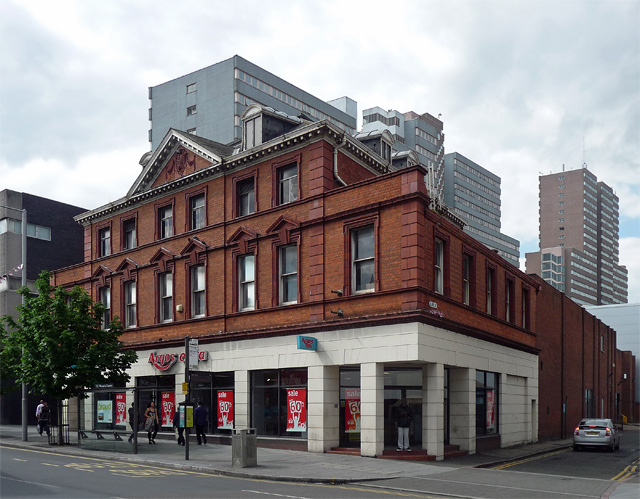
Fruit Store, 37-41 Lower Parliament Street, Nottingham 1900

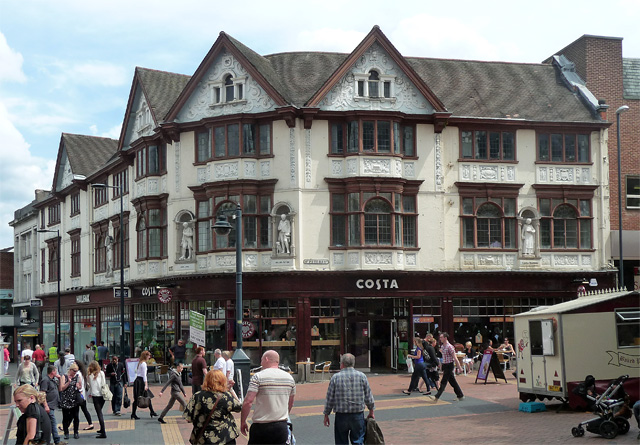
Boots the Chemist, St Peter's Street, Derby 1912

Albert Nelson Bromley (15 July 1850 – 16 August 1934) was an English architect based in Nottingham.

== History ==
He was born in Stafford on 15 July 1850, the son of Charles Nelson Bromley, a surgeon (1817–1853) and Emma Bakewell (1819–1907). His father died two years later and the family moved to Nottingham, where they lived with Bromley's maternal uncle, the architect and surveyor Frederick Bakewell. Bromley was educated in Nottingham, and then at Mr George Shipley's academy, a boarding school in Lincoln. In 1867 he was articled to his uncle but by 1871 he was back in Lincoln and working as an architect's clerk in Henry Goddard's architectural practice. Then from 1872 he spent the next 14 months travelling in Greece, Turkey and the United States. He returned to London and 1874 was working in the office of Charles Barry, junior. He then returned to Nottingham and 1875 he was taken into partnership with his uncle. Within two years Bakewell went into retirement. In 1886 he was elected FRIBA. He became principal architect to the Nottingham School Board and undertook several projects for the Nottingham and District Tramways Company. He was also architect to the National Telephone Company.

In 1897 he was in partnership with Thomas Herbert Waumsley, and from 1912 with Harry Garnham Watkins as Bromley and Watkins. In 1904 Thomas Cecil Howitt, the future architect of the Council House and Council housing, joined Bromley's office as an apprentice, and from 1907 was his assistant. In 1928 Harry Garnham Watkins left the partnership and Thomas Nelson Cartwight (1905-1984) joined, and Bromley, Cartwright and Waumsley were architects to Boots the Chemist. (Nelson later the partnership in 1948 at set up with John Woollatt as Evans, Cartwright and Woollatt.)

He married Elizabeth Skepper Brogden (1853–1940) on 11 April 1878 in St Swithin's Church, Lincoln and they had one daughter, Kathleen Christiana Bromley (1879–1967).

He died on 16 August 1934 at 15 Newcastle Drive, Nottingham and left an estate of £63,359 14s. 2d. (equivalent to £3,920,600 in 2025).

== Works ==
- 15-17 Newcastle Drive, The Park Estate, Nottingham 1878
- Board School, Queen's Walk, Nottingham 1878-79
- Tram station, Basford for the Nottingham and District Tramways Company 1881
- Nottingham Board Boys’ School, Lenton Boulevard, Nottingham 1887
- Royal Midland Institute for the Blind, Chaucer Street, Nottingham 1888
- Clarendon Street Board School 1889
- Midland Bank, Market Place, Heanor, Derbyshire ca. 1890
- Nottingham Joint Stock Bank (later Midland Bank), Market Place, Long Eaton 1891
- Boots the Chemist, 11-13 London Road, Liverpool 1896
- National School, Nether Street, Beeston, Nottingham 1898
- Boots the Chemist, Harpur Street and Silver Street, Bedford, 1898
- Boots the Chemist, Grantham, 1899

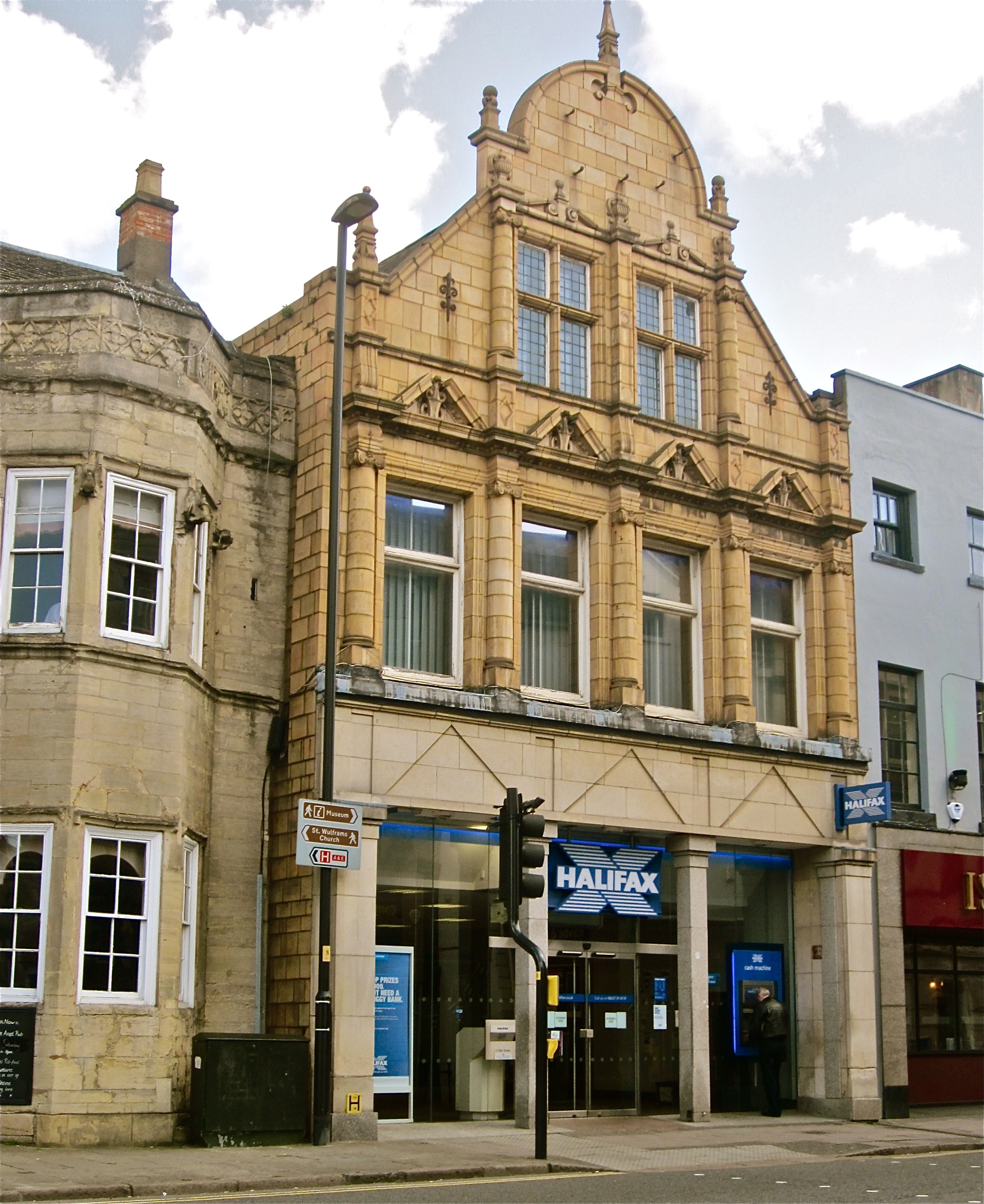
Former Boots Shop, Grantham

- Solicitor's Office, Bottle Lane, Nottingham 1898-99
- Telephone Exchange, George Street, Nottingham 1898-99
- Fruit store, 37-41 Lower Parliament Street, Nottingham 1900 (Argos in 2016)
- Boots the Chemist store, Pelham Street/High Street, Nottingham 1903-04
- Boots the Chemist shop and tea rooms, Turney Street, Nottingham 1905
- Boots Store No 2 1905-07
- Queen's Hotel, Arkwright Street, Nottingham 1905 (ground floor bays)
- Boots the Chemist store, Buxton, 1906
- Boots the Chemist store, Lytham St Anne's, 1906
- Boots the Chemist store, 252-254 West Street, Sheffield 1906
- Telephone Exchange, George Street, Nottingham 1907 (additional two bays)
- Boots the Chemist store, 45 St Peter's Street, Derby 1912
- Boots the Chemist, Northgate, Gloucester 1914
- Boots the Chemist store, Southend, 1915
- Boots the Chemist finishing rooms, Queen's Road, Nottingham 1915-16
- 22 Carrington Street, Nottingham Petrol service station and offices for Anglo-American Oil Co. 1923
- 1-3 Bridlesmith Gate, Nottingham 1927 (south bay)
- Boots the Chemist store, Leicester
- National Provincial Bank, Smithy Row, Nottingham 1927-28
- Boots the Chemist store, Brighton, 1927–28
- Boots the Chemist, Argyle Street and Union Street, Glasgow 1928.
- Boots the Chemist store, Cheltenham
- Harlow Wood Orthopaedic Hospital 1928-29
- Women's Hospital, Peel Street, Nottingham 1928-29

== Literature ==
- Ken Brand Albert Nelson Bromley, Nottingham Civic Society Newsletter, 1988, 2–9; 1989, 14–17.
- Antonia Brodie (ed), Directory of British Architects, 1834–1914: 2 Vols, British Architectural Library, Royal Institute of British Architects, 2001, Vol 1, pg. 263.
- Kathryn A. Morrison, (2003) English Shops & Shopping, Yale University Press.
- Obituary. RIBA Journal, 24 November 1934, 143
