= Oldknows Factory, Nottingham =

Factory building in Nottingham, England

Oldknows Factory
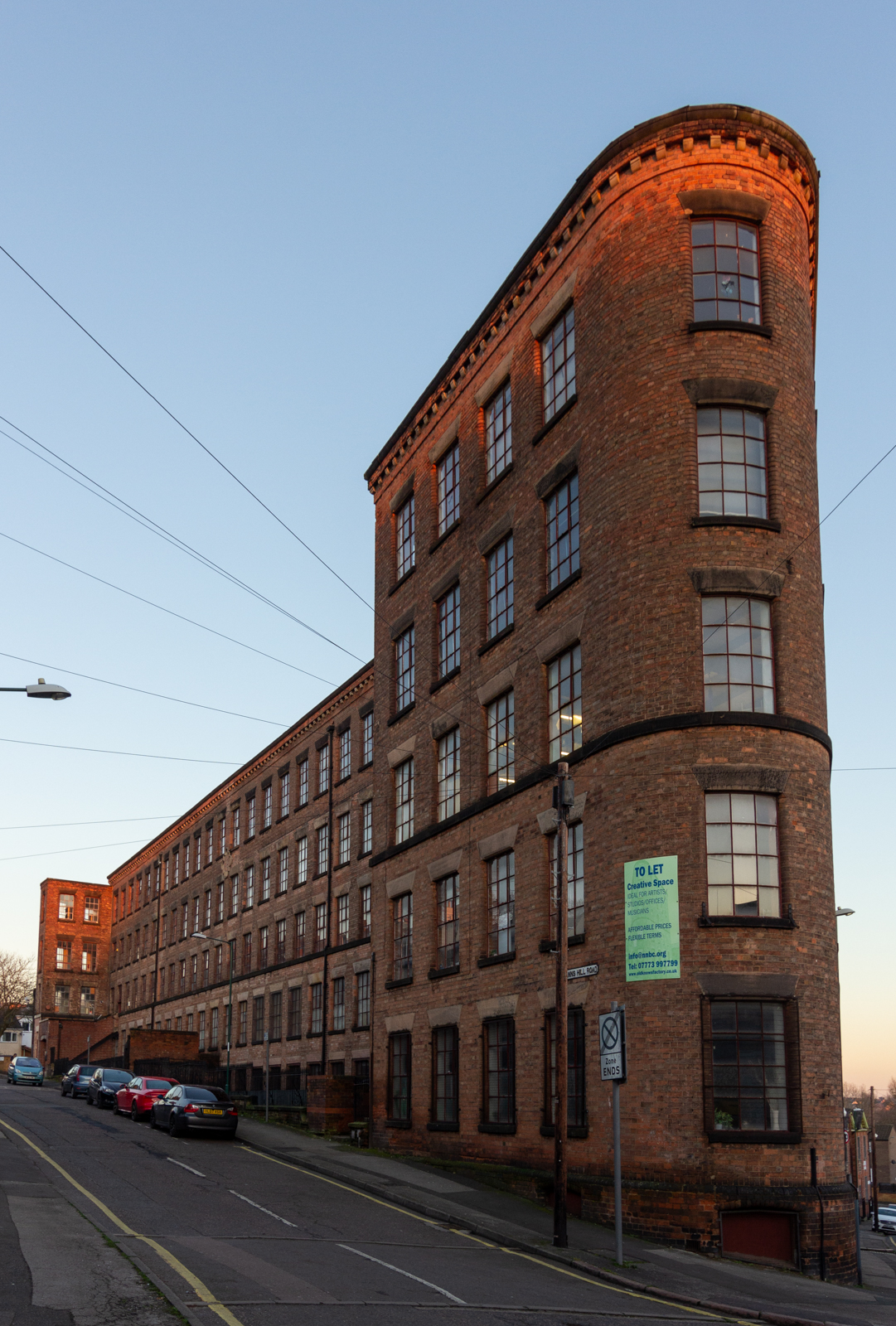
- Oldknows Factory, seen from the St Ann's Hill Road/Alfred Street junction

- Location within Nottingham

General information
- Location: St Anns Hill Road, Nottingham, England
- Coordinates: 52.963611°N 1.149528°W
- Completed: c.1850 (Egerton Street) & c.1855 (St Anns Hill Road)

Design and construction
- Designations: Grade II listed

The Oldknows Factory is a former lace factory alongside St Ann's Hill Road and Egerton Street, in the city of Nottingham in England.

The works are formed from two 18th-century factories, which have since been joined. The original purpose of both factories was the manufacture of lace. They have since been converted to house artist studios, workshops, and offices. The original structure remains as a Grade II-listed building.

== See also ==
- Listed buildings in Nottingham (St Ann's ward)
