= Nottingham Guild Hall =

Building in Nottingham, England

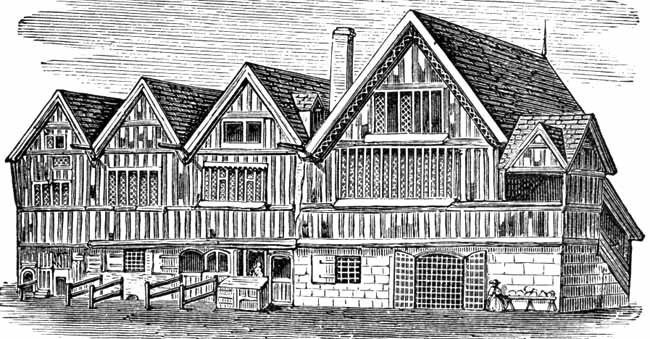
- Nottingham Guild Hall in 1741 by Thomas Sandby

- Location within Nottinghamshire

General information
- Location: Weekday Cross, Nottingham, England
- Coordinates: 52.951616°N 1.146813°W
- Demolished: 1895

Nottingham Guild Hall was built on Weekday Cross in Nottingham. Originally a hall for the merchant Guilds, it became the Court House and Town Hall of the Nottingham Corporation. The building was demolished in 1895.

== History ==
When the merchants established a Guild to regulate trade they erected a Guild Hall on Weekday Cross. This building became the Court House and Town Hall when the borough had its own mayor and aldermen.

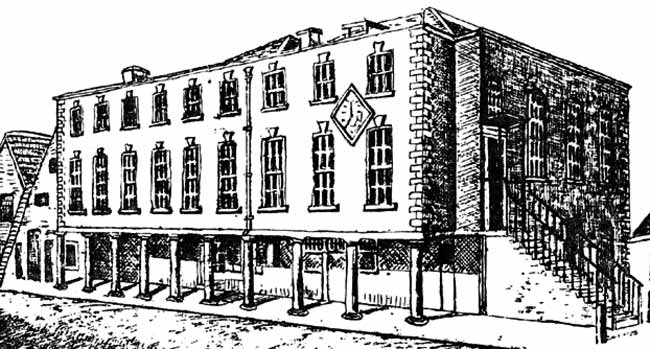
Nottingham Guild Hall in 1797

In 1726 Nottingham Corporation built a new town hall in the Market Place which became known as the Nottingham Exchange. The old town hall on Weekday Cross continued to be used alongside the Exchange and was refaced in brick in 1744. The building was raised several feet higher, and a new clock was provided by local clockmaker, John Wyld.

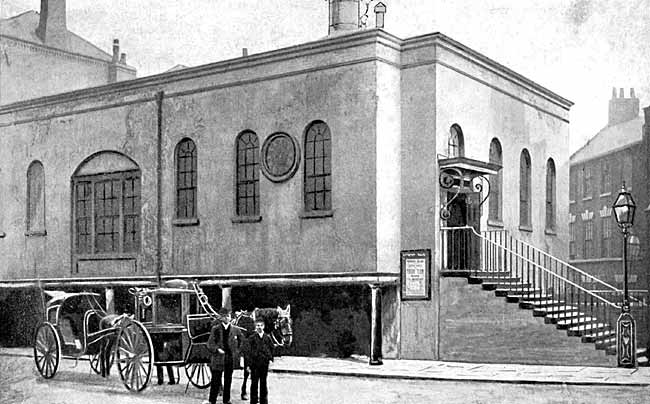
Nottingham Guild Hall in 1890

The Guildhall was abandoned in 1877 with the opening of the new Nottingham Guildhall, and the old town hall was demolished in 1895 when the Great Central Railway built a tunnel with the portal just underneath Weekday Cross. The courts moved to a newly built Nottingham Guildhall on Burton Street. The clock was sold to Alderman Perry for £9 who installed it in his Boulevard Works on Radford Boulevard. It was still being serviced by Cope's of Nottingham in the late 1970s.

This site is now occupied by the Nottingham Contemporary gallery.
