= Stancliffe =

Stancliffe is a surname. Notable people with the surname include:

- Clare Stancliffe, British historian and medievalist
- David Stancliffe (born 1942), Anglican bishop of Salisbury, Wiltshire, UK
- Fred Stancliffe (1885–1975), Australian rules footballer
- George Stancliffe, (born 1955), author of Speed Reading 4 Kids, 3rd edition (2003)
- Michael Staffurth Stancliffe (1916–1987), Dean of Winchester from 1969 to 1986
- Paul Stancliffe, (born 1951), football player from 1975 to 1994

== See also ==
- Stancliffe Hall, listed building in Darley Dale, Derbyshire
- SS Stancliffe, cargo ship operated by Stanhope Steamship Co Ltd in the 1940s
