= St Matthias' Church, Nottingham =

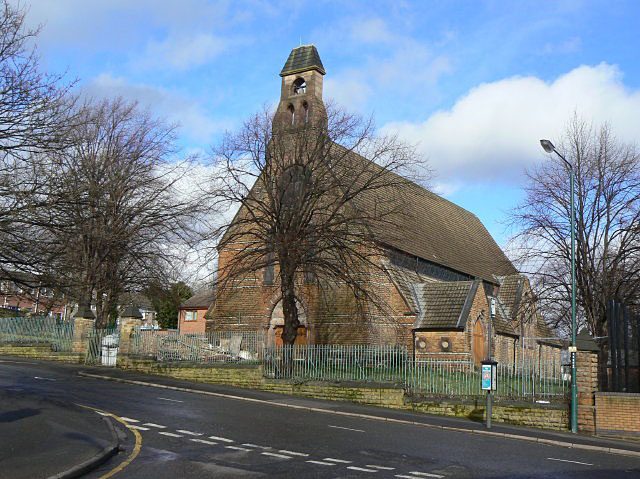
- St Matthias' Church, Nottingham
- 52°57′29″N 1°7′48″W
- Country: England
- Denomination: Church of England
- Churchmanship: Anglo Catholic

History
- Dedication: St Matthias

Architecture
- Heritage designation: Grade II listed building
- Architect(s): Thomas Chambers Hine and Robert Evans
- Style: Gothic Revival
- Groundbreaking: 1867
- Completed: 1868
- Construction cost: £3,000
- Closed: 2003

Administration
- Province: York
- Diocese: Diocese of Southwell
- Parish: Nottingham

St Matthias' Church, Nottingham, was a Church of England church in Sneinton, Nottingham, between 1868 and 2003. In 2009 the building was reopened as St Mary & St George's Coptic Orthodox Church.

It is a Grade II listed building.

== Anglican Church ==
The church was designed by Thomas Chambers Hine and Robert Evans. It was consecrated as a chapel of ease in the parish of St Stephen's Church, Sneinton by The Rt. Revd. John Jackson the Bishop of Lincoln on 6 May 1868. It was built for the sum of £3,000. (equivalent to £293,300 in 2025),.

The chancel was rebuilt in 1950 after it was damaged by enemy action during the Second World War.

=== Anglican incumbents ===
- 1869-1882 Frederick Armine Wodehouse
- 1882-1890 Arthur Powys Woodhouse
- 1890-1892 George Perry-Gore
- 1892-1900 William Henry Castell Malton
- 1900-1903 William Walker
- 1903-1904 Anonymous
- 1904-1912 Ralph Mowbray Howard
- 1912-1931 John Henry Tomlinson
- 1931-1954 Frederick Llewellyn Forsaith Rees
- 1955-1990 Kenneth Leigh Bennett
- 1990-1993 William Albert Porter
- 1994-2002 Rodney Frederic Brittain Smith
- 2003- Malcolm Crook

=== Organ ===
The three manual organ was by E. Wragg & Son dating from 1912. A specification of the organ can be found on the National Pipe Organ Register.

==== Organists ====
- E. Stevenson ???? - 1883

== Coptic Orthodox Church ==
In 2006 the building was sold to the Coptic Orthodox Diocese of the Midlands and is now St Mary and St George's Coptic Orthodox Church.

== See also ==
- Listed buildings in Nottingham (St Ann's ward)
