= Evans, Cartwright and Woollatt =

British architectural firm

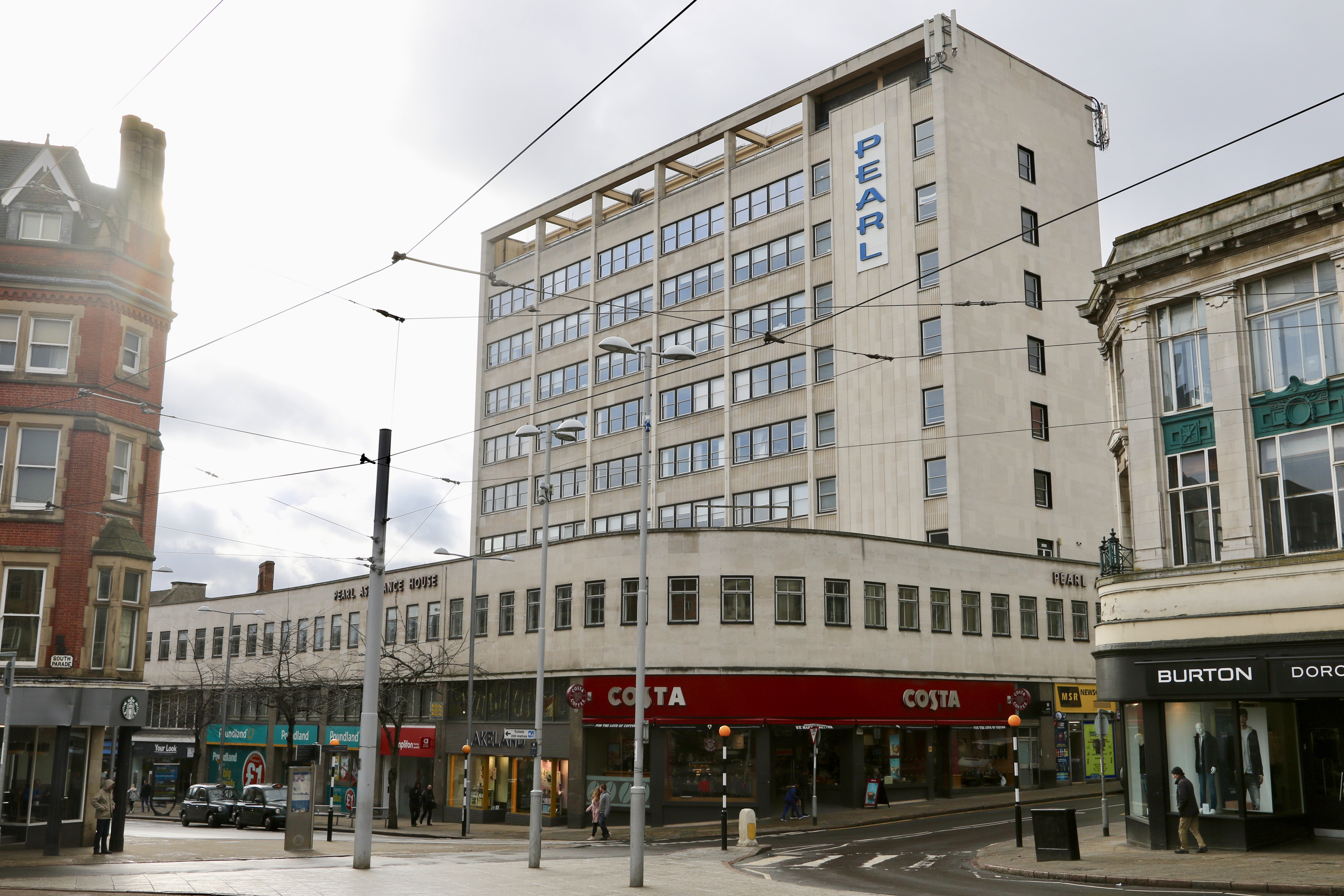
Pearl Assurance, Nottingham 1960-62

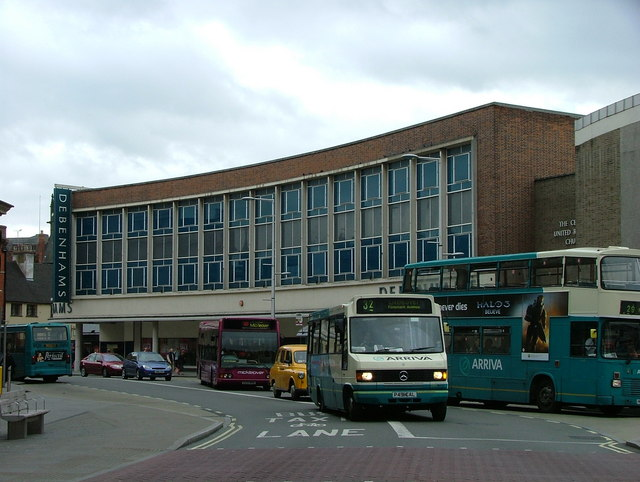
Former Ranby’s Department Store, Derby 1960-62

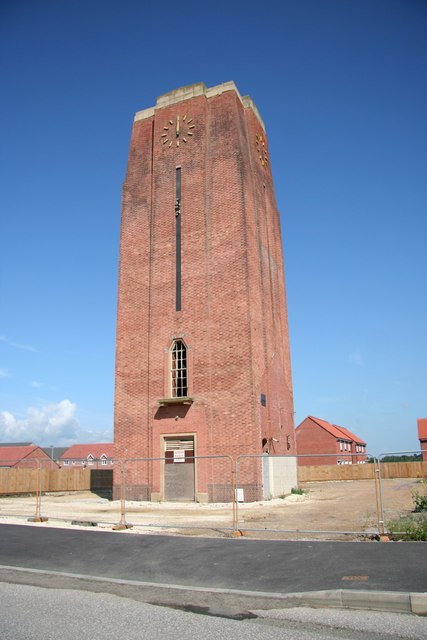
Water tower at Balderton Hospital

Evans, Cartwright and Wollatt was an architectural practice based in Nottingham from 1948 to 1961.

== History ==
The practice was established in 1948, based at 6 Clarendon Street, Nottingham, and evolved from Evans, Clark and Woollatt after John Thomas Clark retired in 1940. Thomas Nelson Cartwright (1905-1984), formerly of Bromley, Cartwright and Waumsley had joined the practice. They specialised in modernist architecture, mostly built in reinforced concrete.

In 1961 the practice changed name again to become Cartwright, Woollatt and Partners.

== Works ==
- Portland College Mansfield 1949-50
- St Mary’s Church, Beeston Rylands 1951-52
- Floor Malting, Grimsby 1953
- Technical Book Department, Portland Building, University of Nottingham 1953-54
- Tetley’s Brewery Malting House, Leeds 1955
- Norwich Union House, 10-12 South Parade, Nottingham 1957-59
- Office Building, Park Row, Leeds 1958-59
- 15 Cavendish Crescent South, The Park Estate, Nottingham 1960 Alterations, additions and conversion of outbuildings
- Pearl Assurance, Wheeler Gate/Friar Lane, Nottingham 1960-62
- Ranby’s Department Store, Victoria Street, Derby 1960-62 (later Debenhams)
- Balderton Hospital, Newark-on-Trent, Nottinghamshire 1961
- Worthington Maltings, Burton on Trent 1962
