= Weekday Cross =

Former market area in Nottingham, England

Coordinates: 52.9514°N 1.1460°W

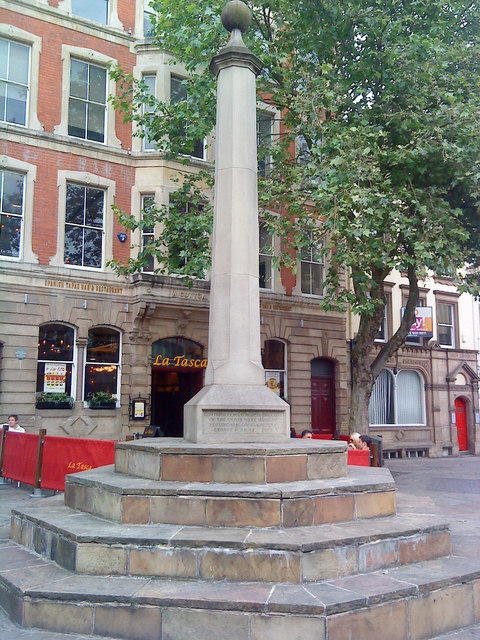
The modern Weekday Cross reinstated by Nottingham Civic Society in 1993

Weekday Cross, in the Lace Market area of Nottingham, was the main market area in Nottingham. As the location of the town hall, Nottingham Guild Hall and main market, it was the centre of the town, before the market moved to the Old Market Square.

It was also known as Weekday Market.

== The Cross ==
A cross (probably not the first) was erected about 1529–1530. The Chamberlain's Accounts contain items of expenditure relating to the purchase of stone and sand and payment to John Mychyll for working the stone. There is also reference to the purchase of drink that was drunk at the cross on Corpus Christi. This may relate to a celebration to mark its completion.

About 1711 the "Cross" was familiarly known as "The Pillar." In 1736, the Crosses were cleaned at a cost of 1s 4d This cross was pulled down in 1804, the Corporation of Nottingham recording:

1804 Tuesday, 6 November
Weekday Cross
Ordered that the Week Day Cross be taken down and the Material sold by publick Auction …

— Minutes of the Common Council 1804–1805

A new Cross was erected in the late 1993 by Nottingham Civic Society.

== The site ==
=== The market ===
The Monday market was for fresh vegetables and butter. Later it moved from Weekday Cross to the 'Monday Cross', now near St. Peter's Square.

A market was held on Wednesdays and Fridays. It was possible to buy butter, eggs, pigeon, wild fowl, fruit and fish.

=== The Guildhall ===
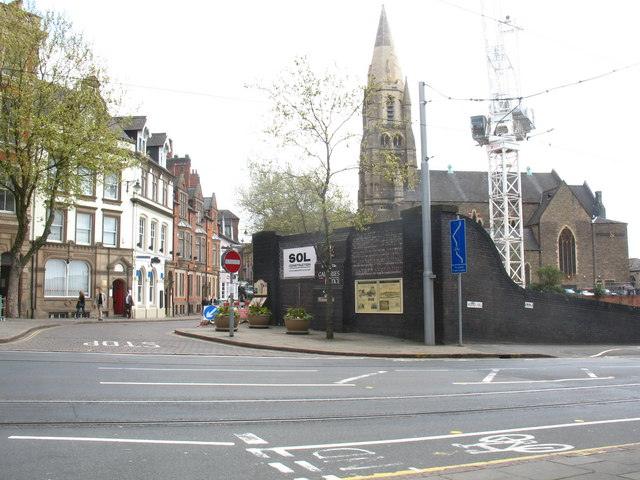
Weekday Cross showing the Great Central Railway tunnel portal before its demolition to make room for the Nottingham Contemporary art gallery

When the merchants established a Guild to regulate trade they erected a Nottingham Guild Hall on Weekday Cross. This building became the Court House and Town Hall when the borough had its own mayor and aldermen.

This site is now occupied by the Nottingham Contemporary art gallery.

=== Nottingham Bluecoat School ===
In 1723, land was given by William Thorpe on High Pavement in Weekday Cross was used and the Nottingham Bluecoat School migrated there, remaining for over a century.

=== The Blind Rabbit ===
The Weekday Cross, is directly outside The Blind Rabbit, and people can see it, while sitting in the outside drinking area.
