= Frederick Bakewell (architect) =

English architect (1824–1881)

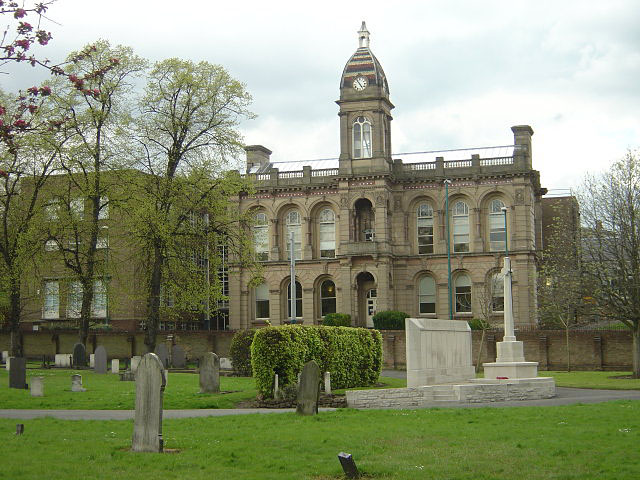
Nottingham School of Art, 1863–65

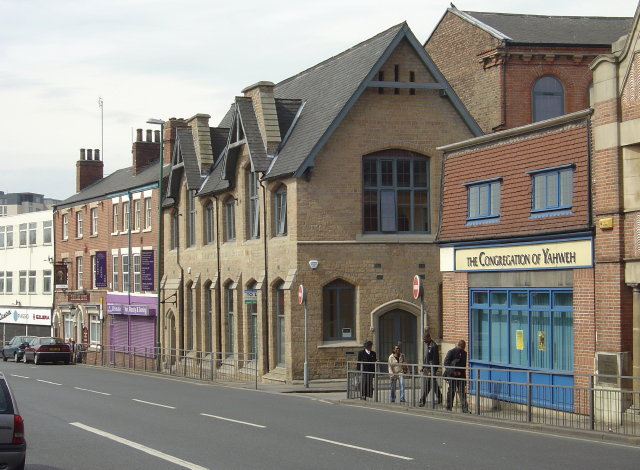
St Luke's Parochial Schools, Carlton Road, 1864

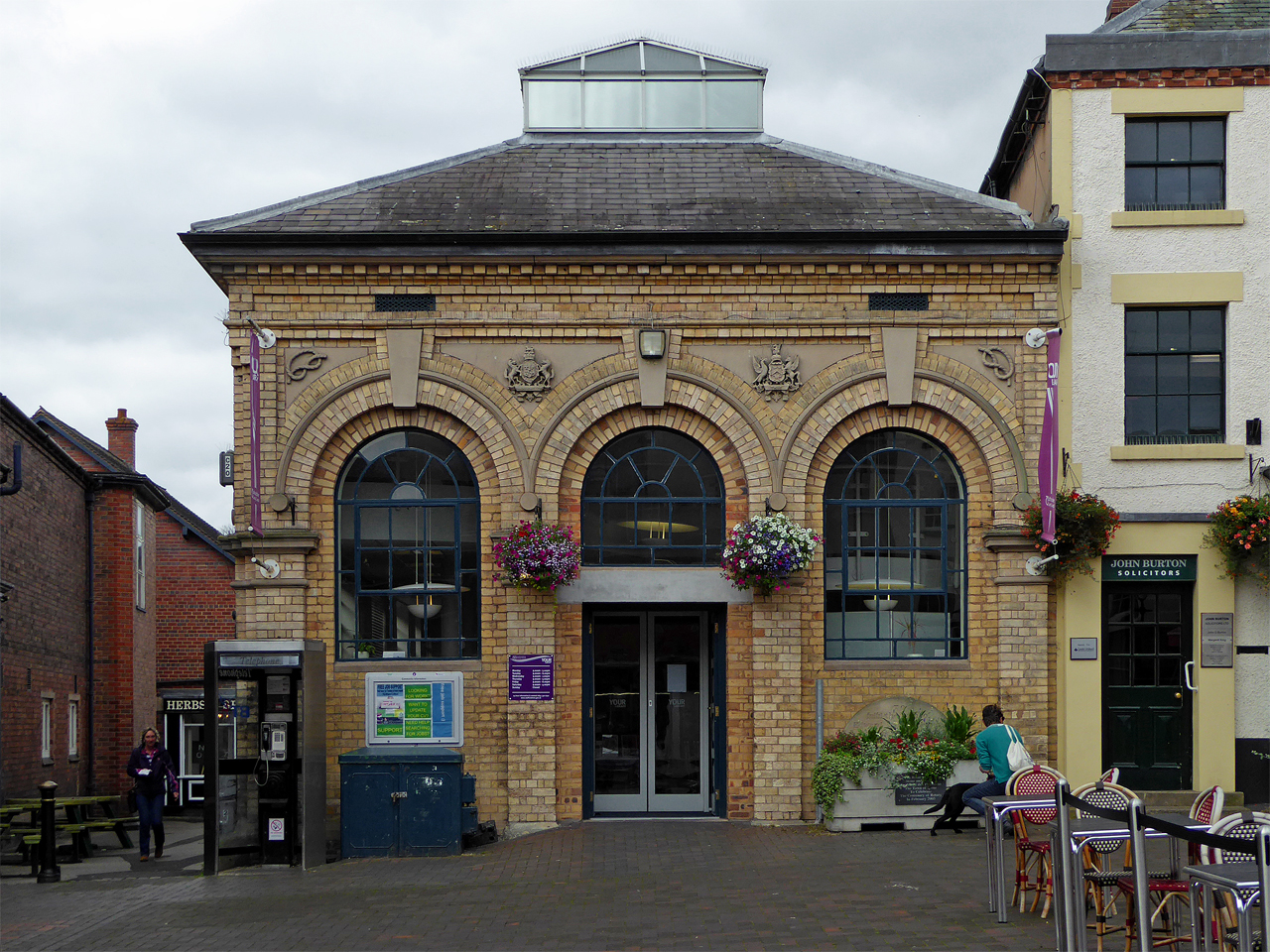
Market Hall, Stone, Staffordshire 1869–70, Now Stone Library.

Frederick Bakewell (1824 – 31 October 1881) was a surveyor and architect based in Nottingham.

== History ==
He was born in 1824 in Stone in Staffordshire, the son of Thomas and Sarah Bakewell. He started practice in Nottingham in Thurland Street in the late 1850s.

In 1874 he entered into partnership with his nephew Albert Nelson Bromley who had formerly been his pupil. He retired in 1876 when the partnership was dissolved and lived in The Elms, Beeston in Nottingham and also in Lincoln until his death in Norwich on 31 October 1881. He left an estate valued at £586 11s. 5d (equivalent to £61,700 in 2025).

== Works ==
- Nottingham School of Art 1863-65 (now Waverley Building, Nottingham Trent University)
- St Luke’s Church, Schools, Carlton Road, Nottingham 1864.
- Vicarage, St Saviour’s Church, Nottingham 1867
- Mill for Smedley at Sandiacre, Derbyshire ca. 1869
- Market Hall, Stone, Staffordshire 1869-70
- Lenton Industrial and Provident Society, Stanford Street, Nottingham 1873
- Sutton Mill, Mansfield 1873 (alterations)
- Huntingdon Street Board School 1874 (with Albert Nelson Bromley)
- Victoria Buildings, Bath Street, Nottingham 1876-77 (with Albert Nelson Bromley. Now Park View Court )
- St John the Evangelist’s Church, Hucknall 1876-77 (with Albert Nelson Bromley)
