= John McCraith =

British Conservative and Unionist politician

Sir John Tom McCraith (1847 – 5 December 1919) was a British Conservative and Unionist politician who served in a range of senior political positions on the Nottingham City Council.

== Life ==
John Tom McCraith was born in Leicester in 1847, the eldest son of William McCraith (d. 1884) of Southwick, Stewartry of Kirkcudbright, an official in the Midland Railway Company, and his wife, Sarah (d. 1897), daughter of James York, of Northamptonshire. His younger brother was Sir James William McCraith. At the age of four, he arrived at Nottingham and went on to carry out his education at Goodacre's School in the City before becoming a yarn merchant. During the Franco-Prussian War of 1870–71, McCraith was visiting Paris and was forced to build barricades when fighting broke out until British authorities negotiated for his release.

McCraith decided to retire from business to pursue a political career and, in 1882, was elected a member of the Nottingham City Council for St Mary's Ward, serving until he was elected an alderman in 1900. He was appointed a Justice of the Peace in 1889, and served as Chairman of the South Nottinghamshire Conservative Association, Vice-Chairman of the Nottinghamshire Territorial Force Association, Director of the Nottingham and Nottinghamshire Banking Company, of the Sandiacre and Stapleford Water Company, of the Nottingham and Derbyshire Electric Power Company and Birks' Manufacturing Company, and a Trustee of the Nottingham Savings Bank. He was also a Commissioner of Income Taxes. Although he declined to serve as Mayor on a number of occasions, he was knighted in 1904 for his political services.

By the time he died, unmarried, on 5 December 1919, McCraith was the longest-serving member of the Nottingham City Council.
