= Nottinghamshire Pride =

LGBT pride charity and festival in Nottingham

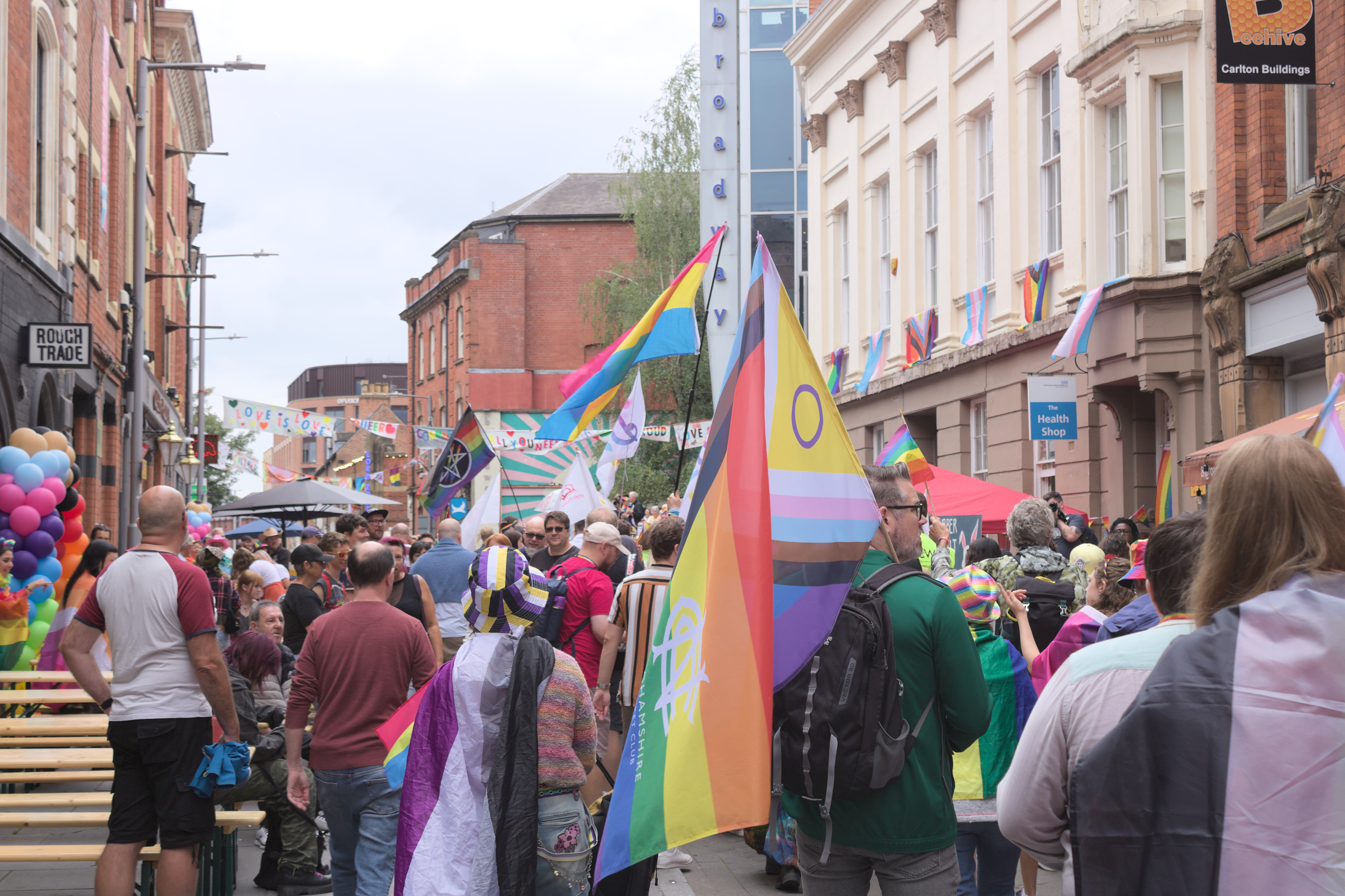
- Nottinghamshire Pride in 2025
- Frequency: Annually
- Locations: Nottingham, England
- Founded: 1997; 29 years ago
- Most recent: 25 July 2026
- Next event: 31 July 2027
- Website: nottspride.co.uk

Nottinghamshire Pride, also known as Notts Pride, is a registered charity in Nottingham, Nottinghamshire, England. It organises an annual LGBTQ pride festival of the same name in the city of Nottingham, usually in July.

== History ==
The first pride festival in Nottingham was held on Broad Street, in the Hockley area of the city, in 1997. It initially went by the name Pink Lace, a name it retained in 1998 and 1999, when Pink Lace was held at Nottingham Castle.

=== 2000s ===
In the year 2000, the festival took the name Nottingham Pride and was held on the Victoria Embankment alongside the River Trent.

Two pride festivals, Nottingham Pride and Pink Lace, were planned in Nottingham in 2001, but neither were successful. No pride festival was laid on in Nottingham in 2002.

Nottingham Pride returned in 2003 at the Arboretum, where each subsequent Nottingham Pride festival took place until 2010, by which time the number of attendants had increased to a point where the park was no longer a suitable venue.

=== 2010s ===
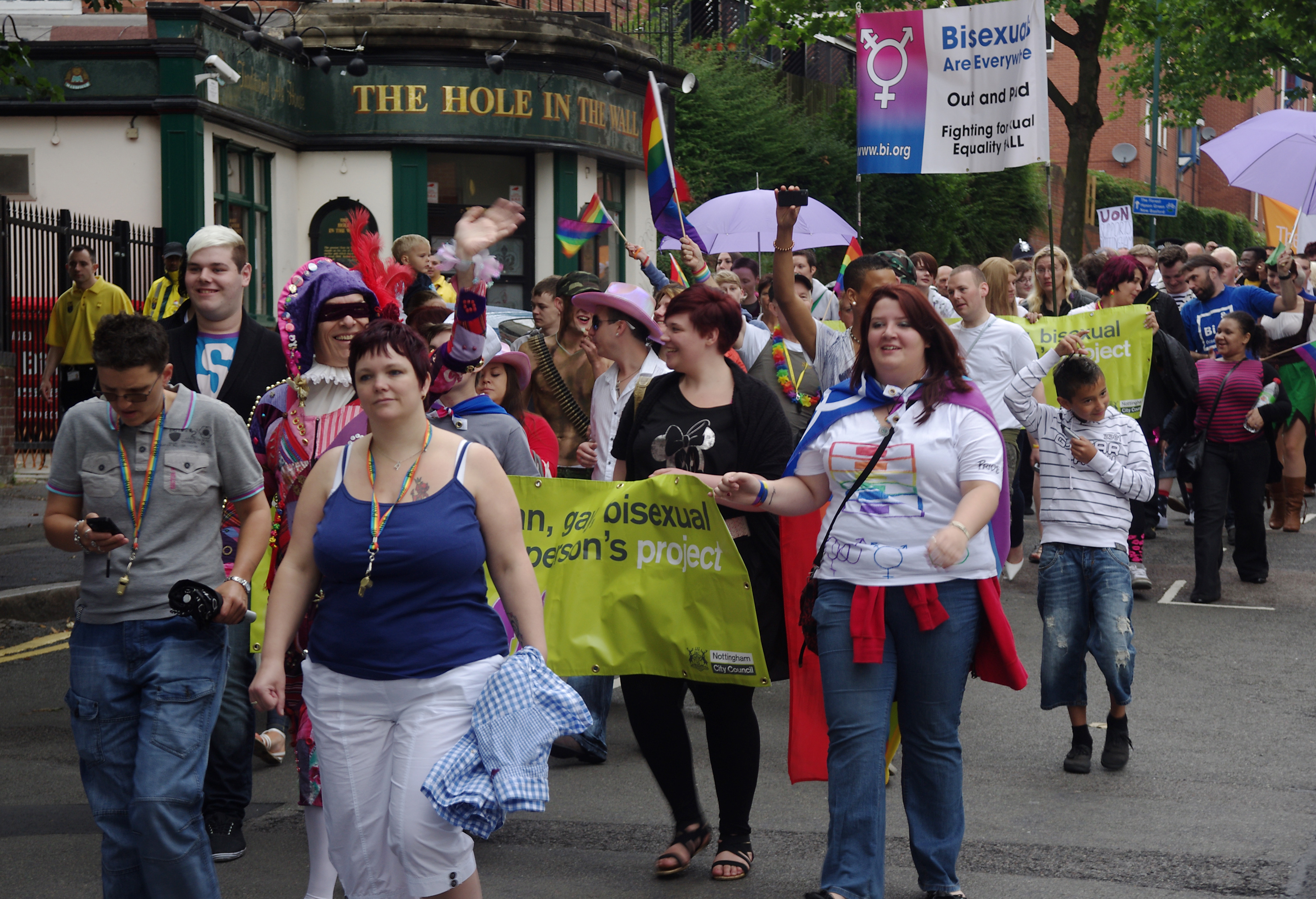
The march at the 2010 event with banners supporting bisexuals

Nottingham Pride 2010 took place at the Forest Recreation Ground on 31 July. It was officially opened by the Lord Mayor of Nottingham, Brian Grocock, and the event was headlined by the Cheeky Girls, with other acts including Kenelis, Lisa Scott-Lee, and Betty.

2,000 people attended the pride march from Old Market Square to the Forest Recreation Ground in 2012, framed as a celebration of the progress of gay rights. This preceded two days of speeches, music and entertainment, which at the time was expected to bring 30,000 people.

Nottinghamshire Pride celebrated its 10th anniversary in 2013, welcoming 14,000 attendees. In October that year, lost sponsors and a resultant lack of funds for the charity, which had fallen into £17,000 of debt, led to its volunteers voting to close it. At the time its events were costing £30,000 per year to run, with a suggested donation of £1 per attendee. At the 2013 event, only a third of the attendees donated money. Chairman Ben Holmes said it had been in financial trouble for the last three years, and that it had attempted to scale down the event to save money.

From 2014, Nottinghamshire Pride returned to the Hockley area; its events would remain there until 2023.

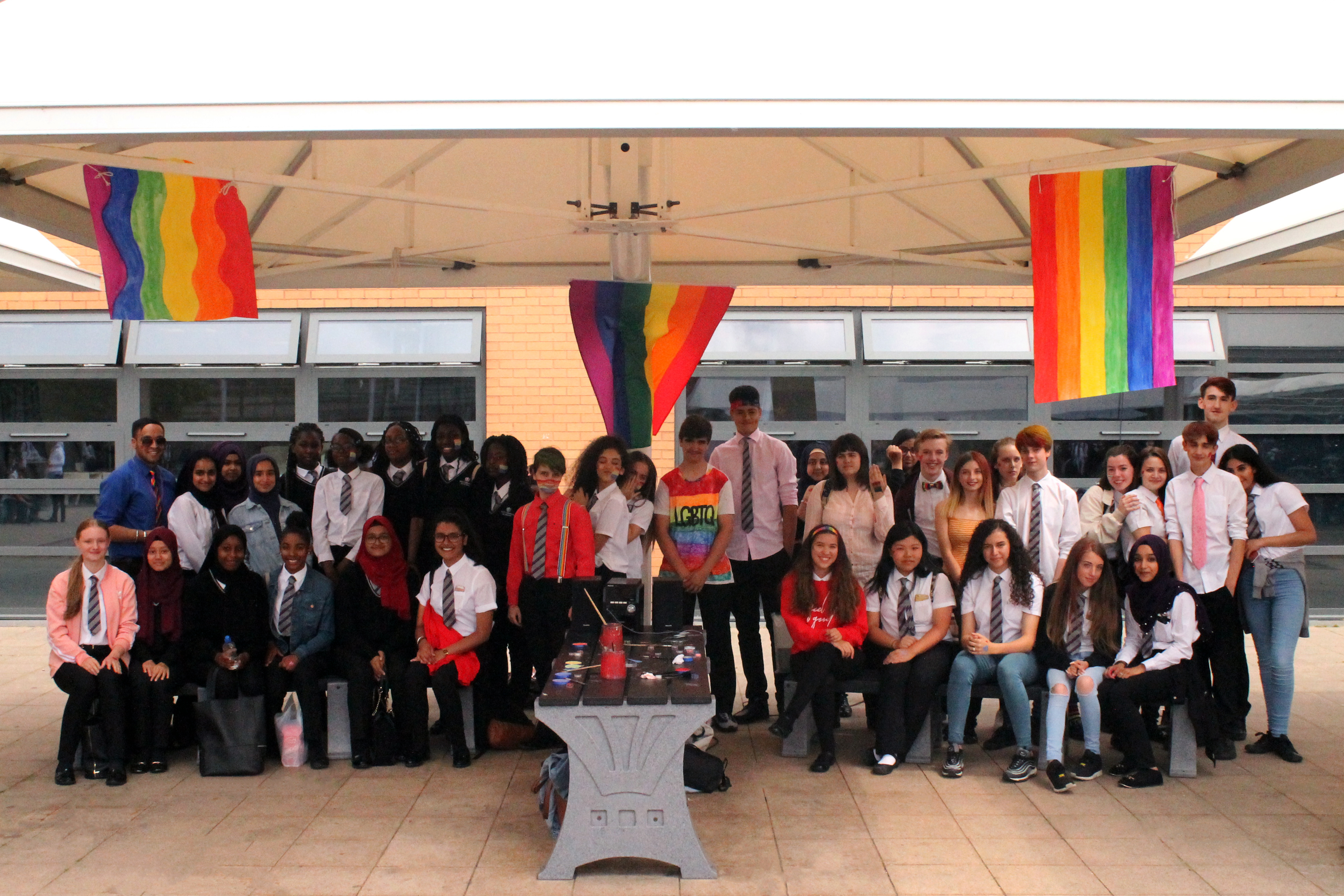
Students at Nottingham Academy, Greenwood Campus supported Nottinghamshire Pride in 2018

In 2018, Pride was held on Saturday, 28 July in the city centre of Nottingham. The parade included many live events by various individuals, stalls, art and music, along with a pride parade that took place at 11 am. The parade began at Lister Gate and finished at Broad Street.

In 2019 Nottinghamshire Pride was held on Saturday 27 July in Nottingham city centre. A series of rainbow crossings were painted in Carlton Street and Broad Street, Hockley, that year.

=== 2020s ===
The COVID-19 lockdown prevented the 2020 event from taking place. The 2021 event, held in September, returned in a scaled back form and drew 9,000 people.

Nottinghamshire Pride returned at full scale in 2022, on 30 July. 15,000 people attended, exceeding the organisers' expectations. Its theme was "We See You". The march began at Lister Gate, then moved to Albert Street, Beastmarket Hill, Long Row, Pelham Street, George Street, and finally Broad Street. It included a Nottinghamshire Fire and Rescue Service engine, carnival marching bands and samba dancers. On Heathcoat Street, performers included YouTube comedy star Charity Shop Sue, who performed a DJ set.

Over 10,000 people gathered for the 2023 event, at which the band Girlband! performed. Howard Donald of the band Take That was scheduled to perform at Binks Yard for the event, though was dropped from Nottinghamshire Pride after liking social media posts that were derogatory towards the LGBTQ community. He said he was "deeply sorry" for the incident. 2023's event was its tenth year in that format.

In 2024, the rainbow crossings at Carlton Street and Broad Street, Hockley were repainted ahead of the event, adding the colours black and brown to represent people of colour as well as blue, pink and white to represent the transgender community. Tram 213 in Nottingham was also painted in rainbow colours, and nicknamed a "trambow", by train firm Alstom. Bishop of Nottingham, Patrick McKinney, stated in June that it was "not appropriate for our Catholic schools to celebrate Pride as we cannot endorse its entire agenda." This was criticised by the charity Notts LGBT+ Network, which said it was "disappointed" with the "regressive" advice. The march had a new route, beginning at Lister Gate at 11 am, travelling along Victoria Street, High Cross Street and Goose Gate, and ending at Sneinton Market. The relocation to Sneinton allowed more people to attend. It had the theme of "the power of love".

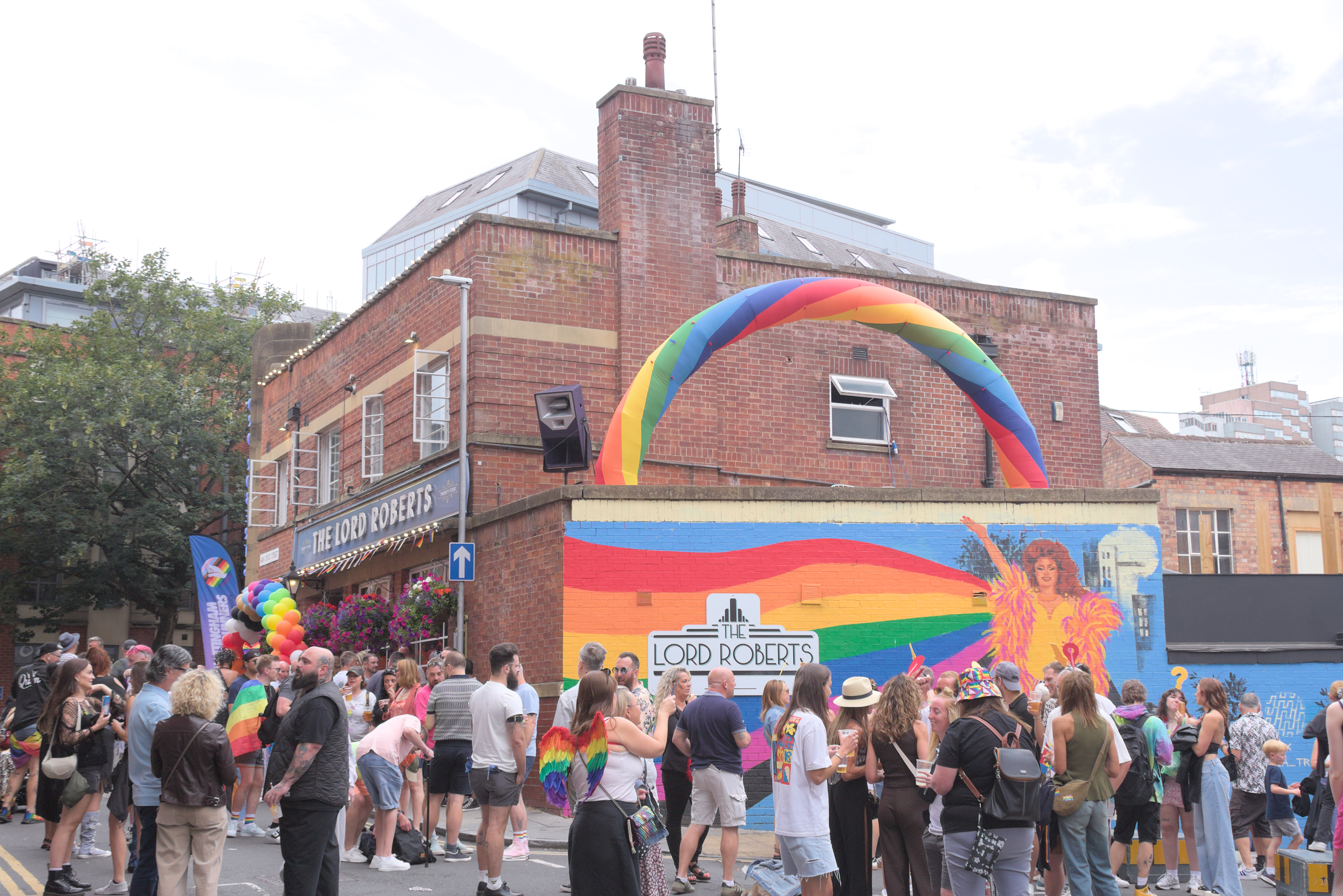
Nottinghamshire Pride 2025

Notts Pride 2025, also based in Sneinton and with a similar march route to 2024's event, benefitted from the addition of a new acoustic stage hosted by the Grove, a new independent music venue in the city. Acts included the return of Girlband!, and a speech by Laquarn Lewis from the series What It Feels Like for a Girl, based on the memoirs of Hucknall-born Paris Lees.
