= Scott Cinema, Bridgwater =

Cinema and bingo hall in Bridgwater, England

Odeon Cinema Scott Cinema
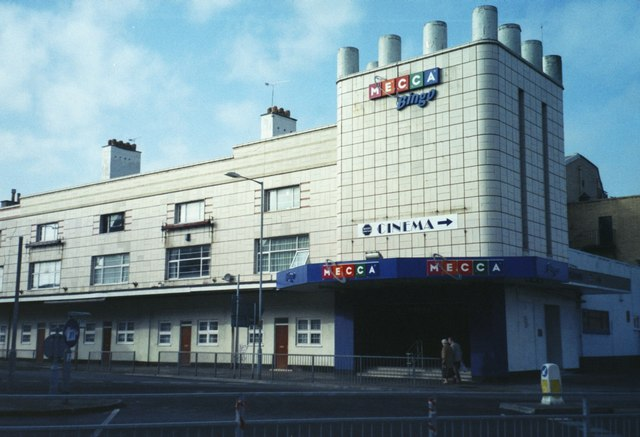
- The building in 2006

General information
- Architectural style: Art Deco
- Location: Bridgwater, Somerset grid reference ST 295 370, Penel Orlieu; Bridgwater TA6 3PH, United Kingdom
- Coordinates: 51°07′40.1″N 3°00′29.7″W
- Opened: 13 July 1936
- Closed: 29 September 2022

Design and construction
- Architect: Thomas Cecil Howitt

Website
- bridgwater.scottcinemas.co.uk

Scott Cinema (originally the Odeon Cinema) was a cinema in Bridgwater, Somerset England. Built in 1936, it was notable for its Art Deco style.

== History ==
=== The Odeon ===
The cinema opened as one of the chain of Odeon Cinemas. It was designed by Thomas Cecil Howitt, who designed other cinemas of the Odeon chain including the Odeon Cinema, Weston-super-Mare. The film The Amateur Gentleman was shown on the opening night, 13 July 1936.

The auditorium seated 1,525, of which 931 were in the stalls and 594 in a raised balcony that did not overhang the stalls. There were stage facilities, used by local drama companies. Externally, the corner entrance was below a tower, and to its left the building included a row of shops with flats above.

=== The Classic, and later ===
It was renamed the Classic in 1967, after its sale to the Classic Cinema chain. In 1973 there was a conversion into a bingo club in the stalls section, and two cinemas, each seating 250, in the raised balcony section.

It closed as a Classic Cinema in 1983, and later opened as an independent company. Following this, it then formed part of the Scott Cinemas chain, being renamed Scott Cinema about 2005. There was refurbishment in 2005, 2011 and 2013.

The cinema finally closed on the 29 September 2022 after 86 years of operation, prior to Scott Cinemas moving to a new cinema nearby at Northgate Yard, Bridgwater.
