= The Arboretum, Nottingham =

Public park in Nottingham, England

Arboretum
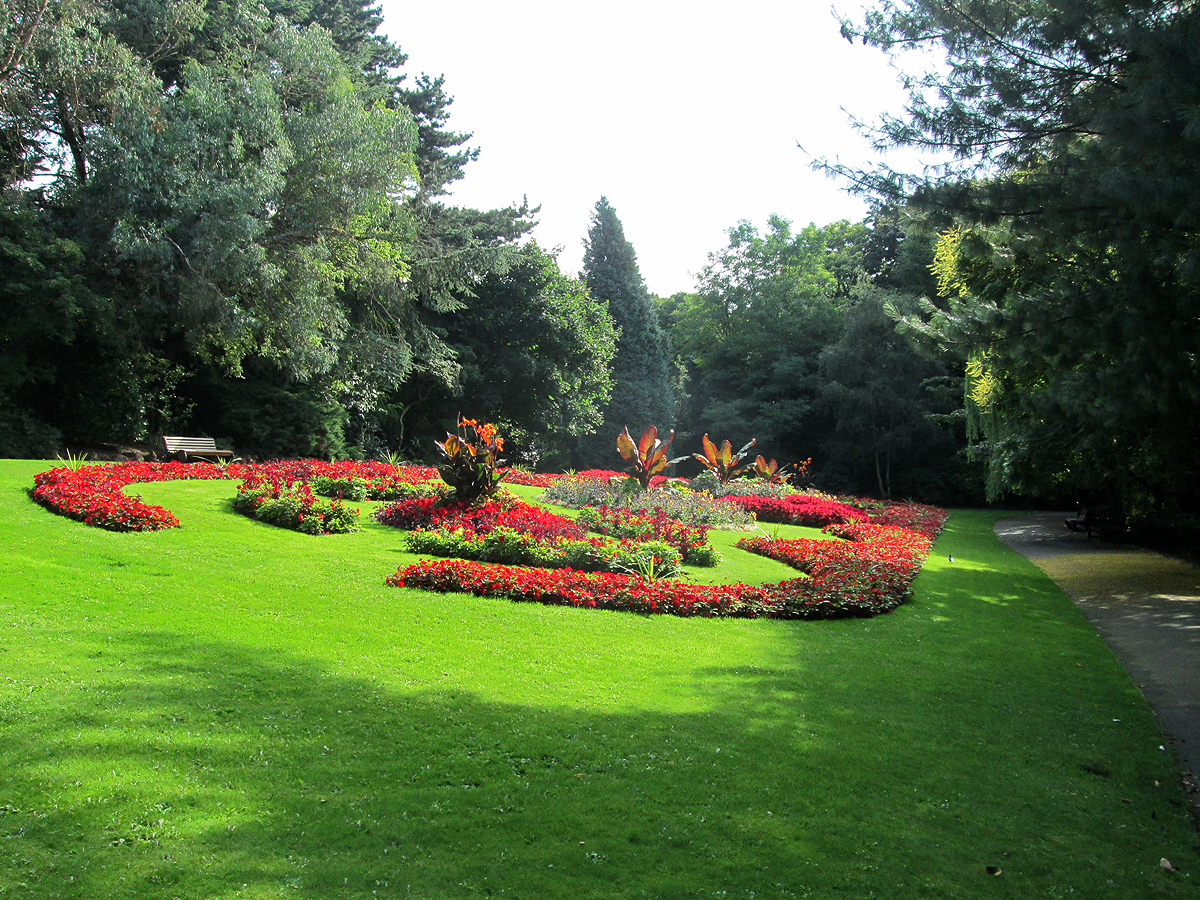
- A view of the park
- Interactive map of Arboretum
- Type: Public park
- Location: Nottingham, England
- Coordinates: 52.961°N 1.157°W
- Created: 1852
- Operator: Nottingham City Council
- Status: Open year round

St. Mary's Nottingham Inclosure Act 1845
- Act of Parliament
- Parliament of the United Kingdom
- Long title: An Act for inclosing Lands in the Parish of Saint Mary in the Town and County of the Town of Nottingham.
- Citation: 8 & 9 Vict. c. 7 Pr.

Dates
- Royal assent: 30 June 1845

Text of statute as originally enacted

The Arboretum is a city park in Nottingham, England. It was the first designated public park in Nottingham, selected under the authority of section 53 of the St. Mary's Nottingham Inclosure Act 1845 (8 & 9 Vict. c. 7 Pr.). The botanist and horticultural publisher, Samuel Curtis, oversaw the design of the park which officially opened on 11 May 1852. In 1986 it was Grade II* listed with Historic England.

The Arboretum is a Green Flag Award-winning park that contains more than 800 trees belonging to 65 species.

== History ==
Nottingham mayor and lace manufacturer, Mr W Felkin, and Sheriff of the Borough of Nottingham, Mr. Ball, opened the park to of a crowd of 30,000 people.

It was designed as a botanical collection, a tranquil place to relax, and a major attraction in the heart of Victorian Nottingham. From 1852 it has been open free of charge on Sunday, Monday and Wednesday, but charged 6d admission (equivalent to £3.02 in 2025) on other days, or £1 (equivalent to £120.7 in 2025) for a yearly permit.

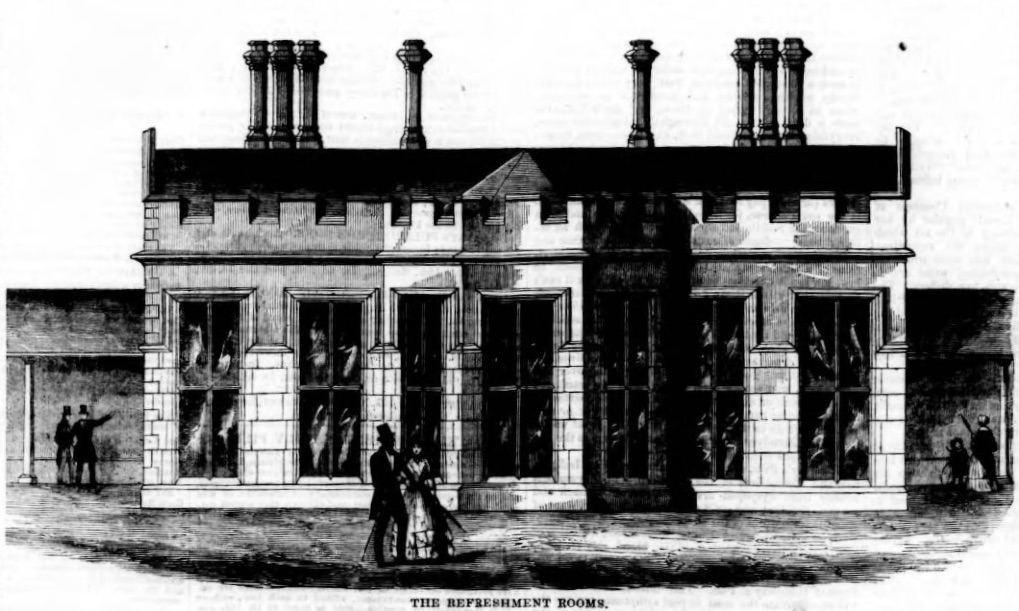
The Refreshment Rooms

Refreshment rooms with a banqueting hall occupying the entire frontage, built by James Ebrank Hall to designs in the Tudor style by Henry Moses Wood, opened in 1852. The building also comprised a ladies' room, refectory, kitchen, entrance hall with staircase, and three chambers upstairs. The whole was constructed of brick with stone facings and a castellated front. The wings of the refreshment rooms were demolished in 1932. After 1957 the remainder of the building traded as a pub under the names, The Arboretum Rooms, The Arboretum pub (also known as 'The Pub in the Park'), Arboretum Hotel and Arboretum Manor. In 1965, the building was severely damaged by fire and had to be rebuilt almost completely. In 2006, another fire resulted in its demolition.

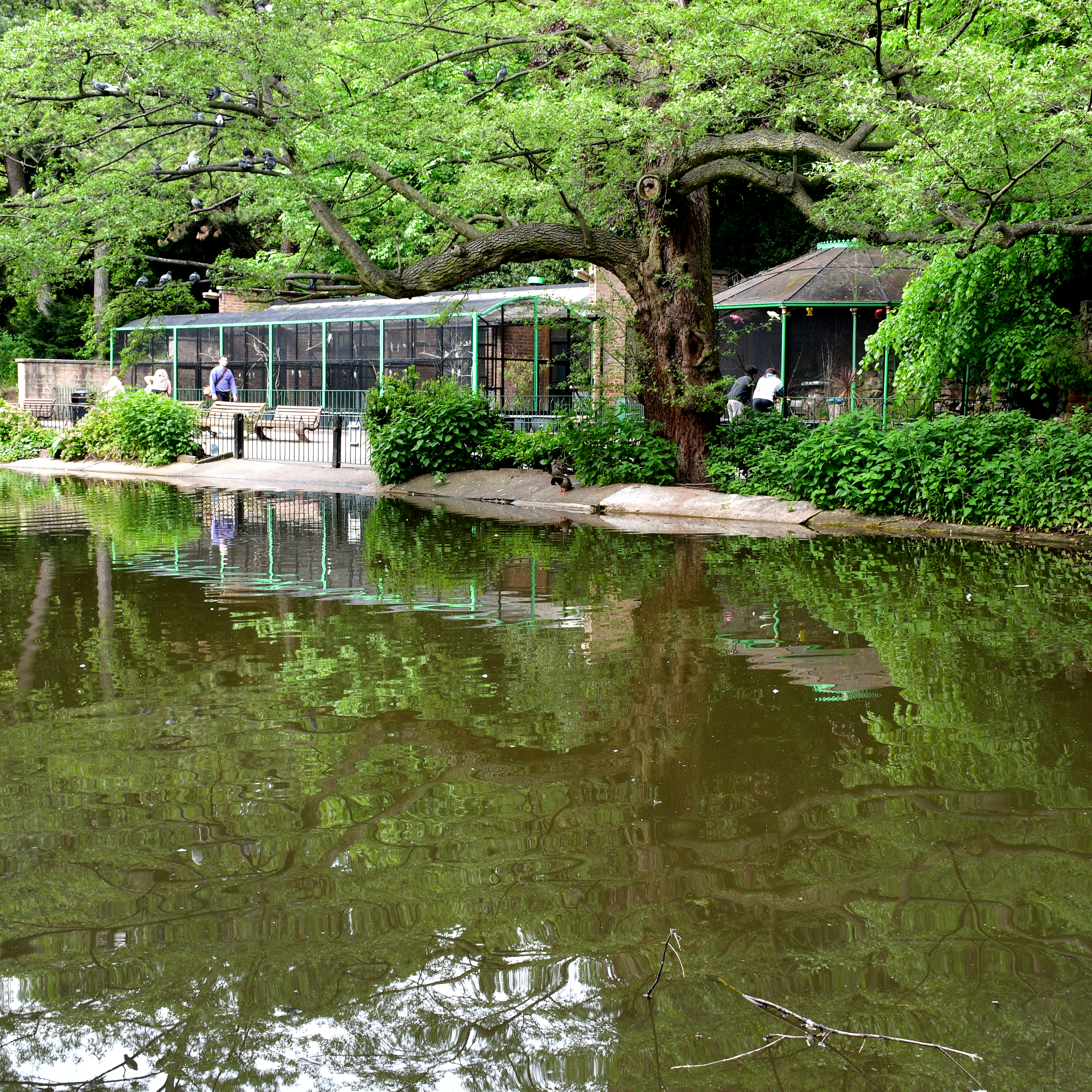
The Oldest and Newest Aviaries

The Circular Aviary was opened in 1889, with cast-iron uprights and roof struts covered with modern steel mesh. The Upper Aviary was built in 1934 to house tropical birds. The Main Aviary of brick was constructed in 1955/6.

The first bandstand was moved here from the green in Nottingham Castle in 1881 and placed in front of the Refreshment Rooms. A new one designed by city architect Frank Beckett Lewis replaced it in 1907.

English Heritage has designated the arboretum a Grade II* listed site on the Register of Historic Parks & Gardens and the park's Bell Tower, bandstand and Circular Aviary have all received Grade II listing protection.

Arboretum was the name of a ward in the City of Nottingham until 2019, when it was merged with the Hyson Green ward to form the Hyson Green and Arboretum ward. At the time of the 2011 census, the former Arboretum ward had a population of 13,321.

== Facilities and events ==
There is an aviary built in 1889 that is Grade II listed, and a bandstand built in 1907 by Frank Beckett Lewis that is also Grade II listed.

There have been many functions held at the Arboretum including the annual Nottingham Pride festival.

== Listed buildings within the Arboretum ==
In addition to the Bell Tower, the aviary and the bandstand, the Arboretum contains a number of other listed buildings, all at Grade II. These include: the main gateway and entrance; two lodges at the south-west and east; a pedestrian subway, all by Henry Moses Wood and dating from 1851–52; a statue of Feargus O'Connor of 1859 by J. B. Robinson; and a war memorial to the 59th (2nd Nottinghamshire) Regiment of Foot of 1862–63 by Marriott Ogle Tarbotton. The cupola of the war memorial formerly contained a bell looted by British troops from a temple in Canton during the Second Opium War; this was removed to the regimental museum in 1956. Two of the cannon were captured at Sebastopol in 1854–55 during the Crimean War and the other two are replicas.
