= South Parade, Nottingham =

Row of buildings in Nottingham, England

South Parade
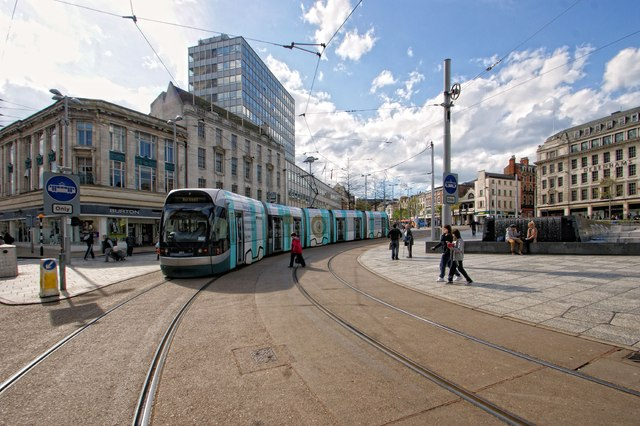
- A view

- Location within Nottingham
- Maintained by: Nottingham City Council
- Coordinates: 52.9530°N 1.1501°W

South Parade is a row of buildings in Nottingham City Centre forming the south side of Old Market Square, Nottingham which runs from Wheeler Gate to Exchange Walk.

== History ==
In the thirteenth century this area was known as Timber Hill. Timber merchants stored and sold wood in the buildings here. As early as 1836 it was being known as South Parade.

== Notable buildings ==
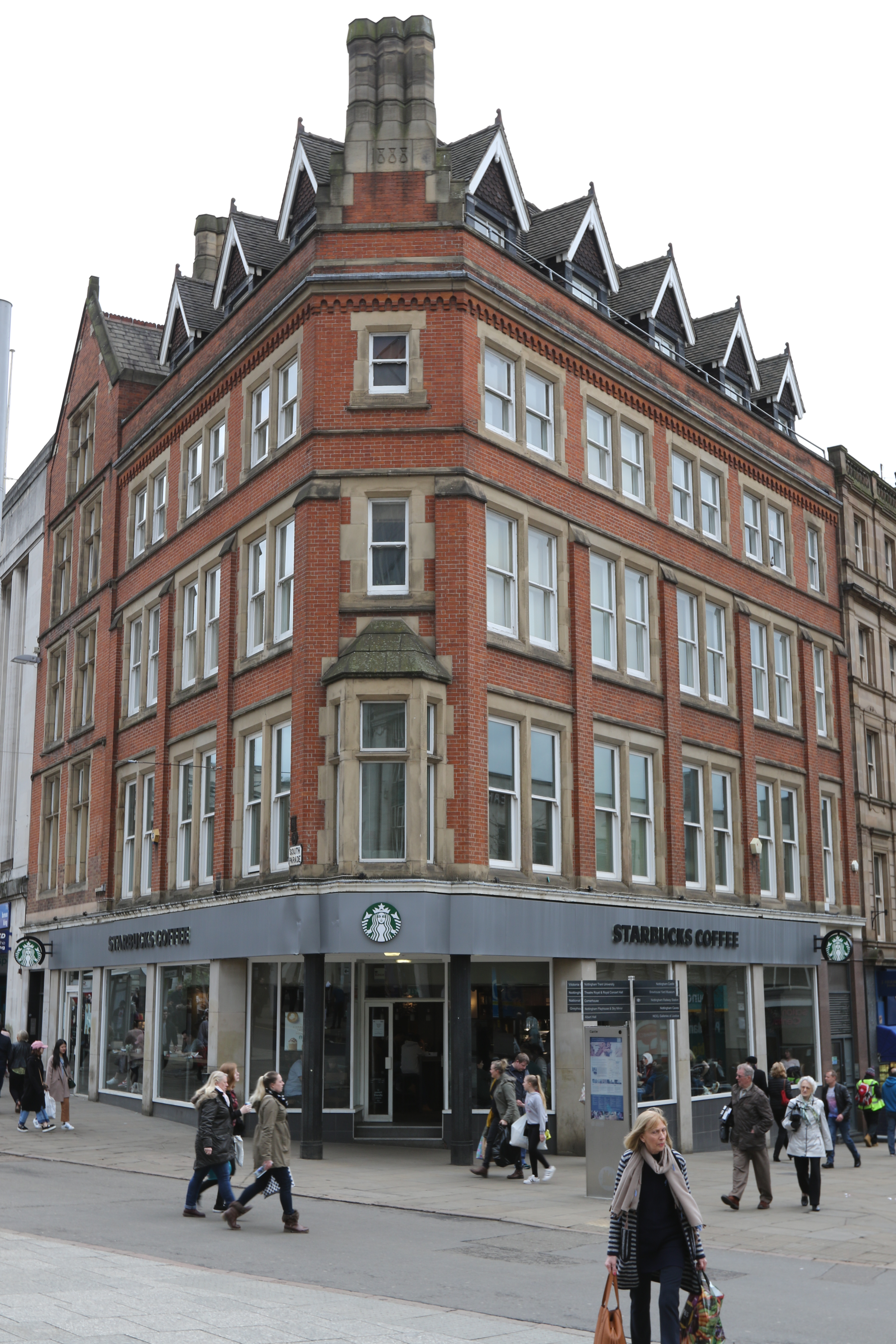
1, 2 and 3 South Parade 1888

- 1-3, by Evans and Jolley 1888 (Starbucks Coffee House in 2018)
- 4-9 Woolwich Equitable Building Society by Thomas Cecil Howitt 1936-37
- 10-12 Norwich Union House by Evans, Cartwright and Woollatt 1957-59
- 15 Smith's Bank by George R. Isborn 1878 (National Westminster Bank in 2018)
