= Arthur Dale =

English architect

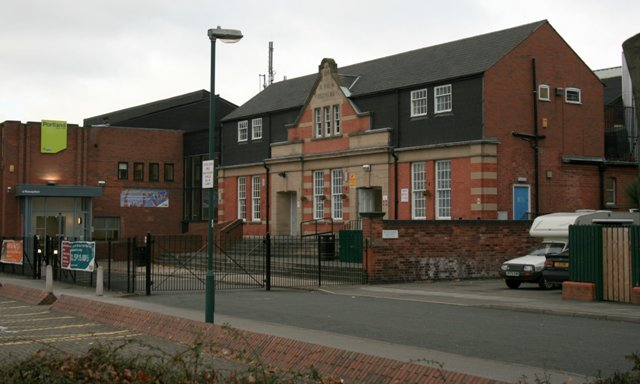
Portland Baths, Muskham Street, Nottingham 1912

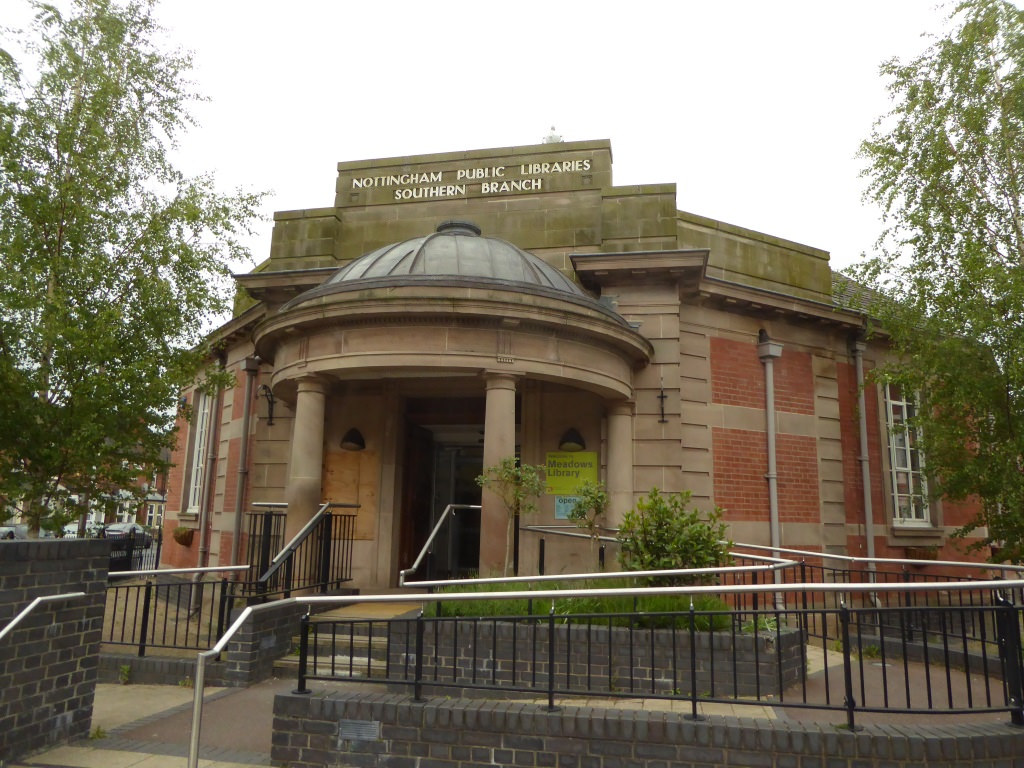
Library, Wilford Grove, Nottingham 1925

Arthur Dale LRIBA (1859–1931) was an English architect based in Nottingham.

== Career ==
He was born in Leicester in 1859 the son of James Mee Dale and Ann.

He was articled to William Millican and then remained as his assistant. From 1883 he was assistant to James Tait in the Leicester Borough Surveyor's Office and in 1889 he moved to the Nottingham City Engineers' Department. He was appointed assistant City Architect in 1901.

In 1910 he was appointed as Licentiate of the Royal Institute of British Architects.

In 1912 he was appointed Nottingham City Architect in succession to Frank Beckett Lewis on a salary of £450 per annum (equivalent to £44,400 in 2025). He held this position until 1927 when he was succeeded by Thomas Cecil Howitt.

He took his own life by poisoning on 1 October 1931, having suffered from a long illness.

== Notable works ==
- Portland Baths, Muskham Street, Nottingham 1912
- Nottingham School of Art 1914 (Extension and improvements)
- Water Filtration System, Eastwood, Nottinghamshire 1917
- Morley Council School, Wells Road, Nottingham 1922
- Police and Fire Brigade War Memorial, Nottingham Guildhall, 1923
- Library, Wilford Grove, Nottingham 1925
