= Thomas Cecil Howitt =

British provincial architect

- Born: 6 June 1889; Watnall Road, Hucknall, Nottinghamshire, England
- Died: 3 September 1968 (aged 79); Orston, Nottinghamshire, England
- Occupation: Architect
- Practice: Associated architectural firm[s]
- Buildings: Nottingham Council House

Thomas Cecil Howitt, OBE (6 June 1889 – 3 September 1968) was a British provincial architect of the 20th Century. Howitt is chiefly remembered for designing prominent public buildings, such as the Council House and Processional Way in Nottingham, Baskerville House in Birmingham (first phase of the unrealised Civic Centre scheme), Newport Civic Centre, and several Odeon cinemas (such as Weston-super-Mare and Bristol). Howitt's chief architectural legacies are in his home city of Nottingham. He was Housing Architect for the City Council, designing municipal housing estates which are often considered to be among the finest in terms of planning in the country.

== Early years ==
Howitt was born at Hucknall, near Nottingham and educated at Nottingham High School, leaving in 1904 to be apprenticed to the prominent Nottingham architect, Albert Nelson Bromley. Bromley was architect to the Nottingham School Board and did extensive work for the Boots Company. In 1907, Howitt studied briefly at the Architectural Association School in London. He later opened a London branch office for Bromley, before returning to the Nottingham office until 1913.

Following a study tour of Europe in early 1914, Howitt was invited to become the company architect for Boots, however, the war soon intervened. Howitt was commissioned in November 1914, rising to the rank of Lieutenant-Colonel in the Leicestershire Regiment. He was awarded the Distinguished Service Order and French Croix de Guerre, as well as a Chevalier of the Legion d'Honneur (for action at the Battle of the Marne). Howitt was demobilised with the rank of Major in October 1919, and joined the City Engineer's Department at Nottingham City Council.

== Architectural career ==
In 1926, Howitt's rising status in the profession was marked by election as a member of the RIBA Council. The following year, he made a study tours of the US and Canada and in 1928 to Denmark and Sweden (where he saw Stockholm Town Hall-writing an article about it for the local Nottingham Guardian).

In 1928 he was appointed City Architect in Nottingham in succession to Arthur Dale, but he relinquished this position in 1930 in favour of Edward Phillips.

As work on the Council House came towards completion, Howitt wished to set up his own practice, and after being asked to stay in post until a suitable successor could be appointed, he established an office in Exchange Buildings in December 1930.

== Major architectural works ==
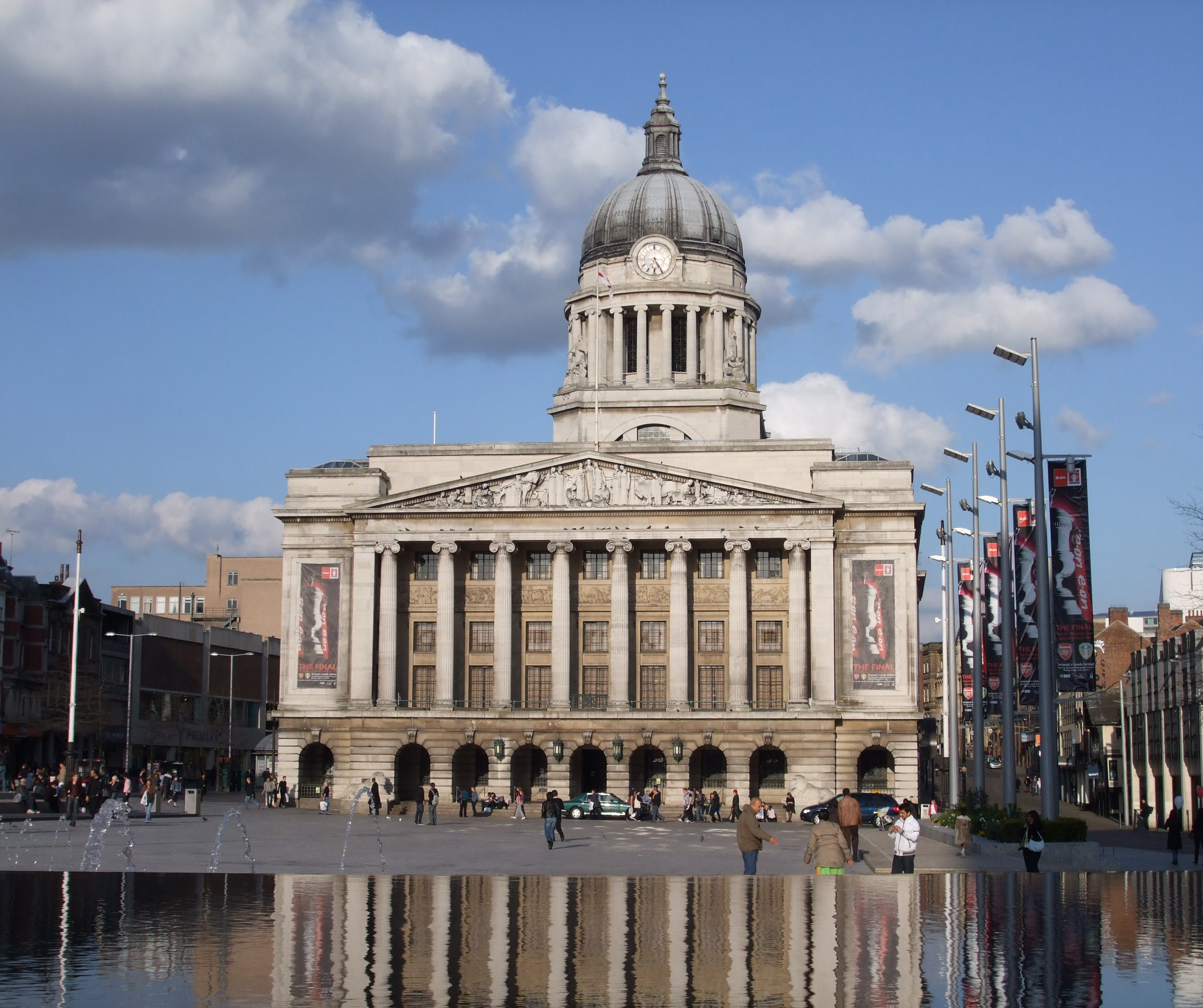
The Council House, Nottingham

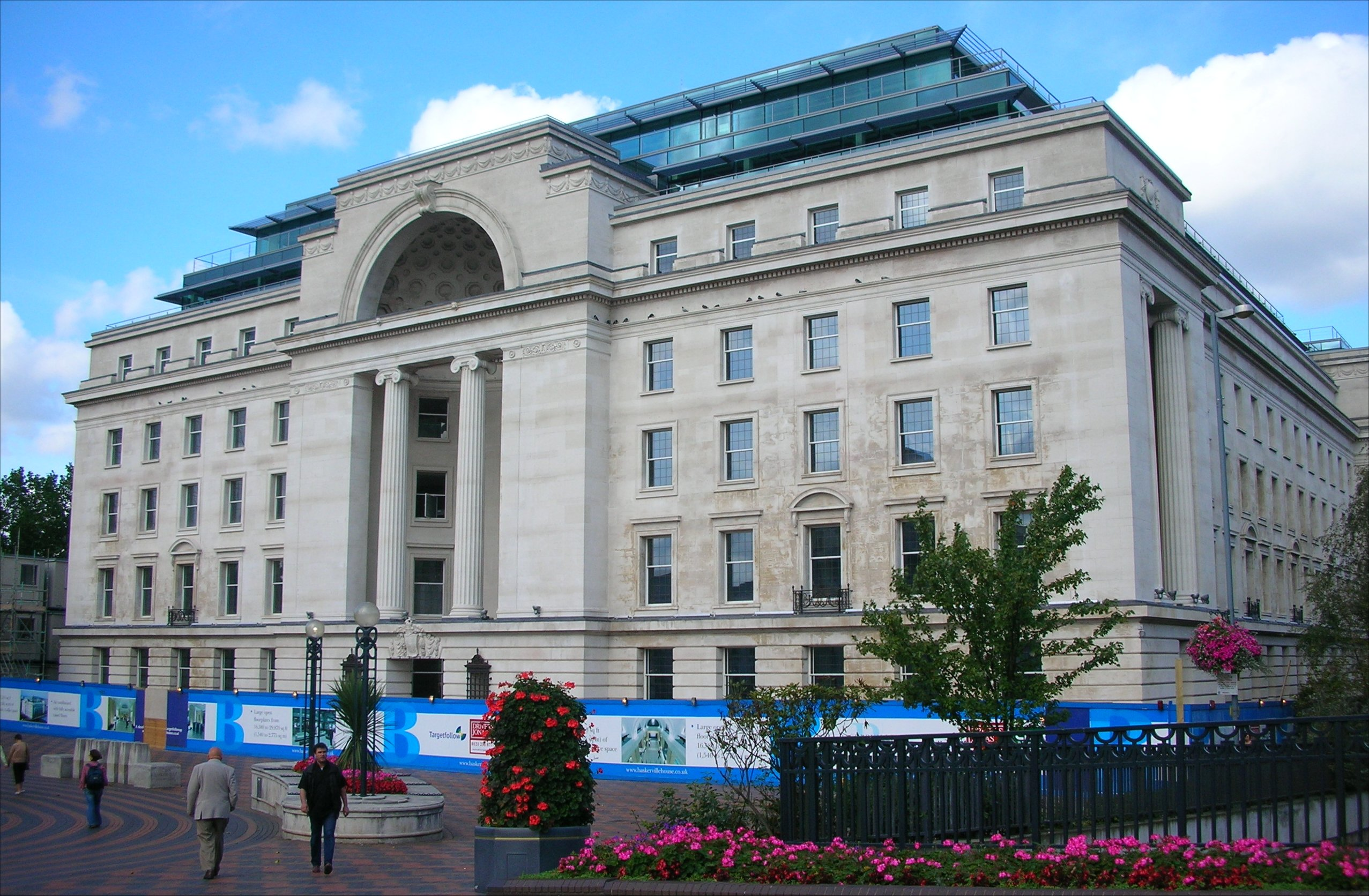
Baskerville House, Birmingham

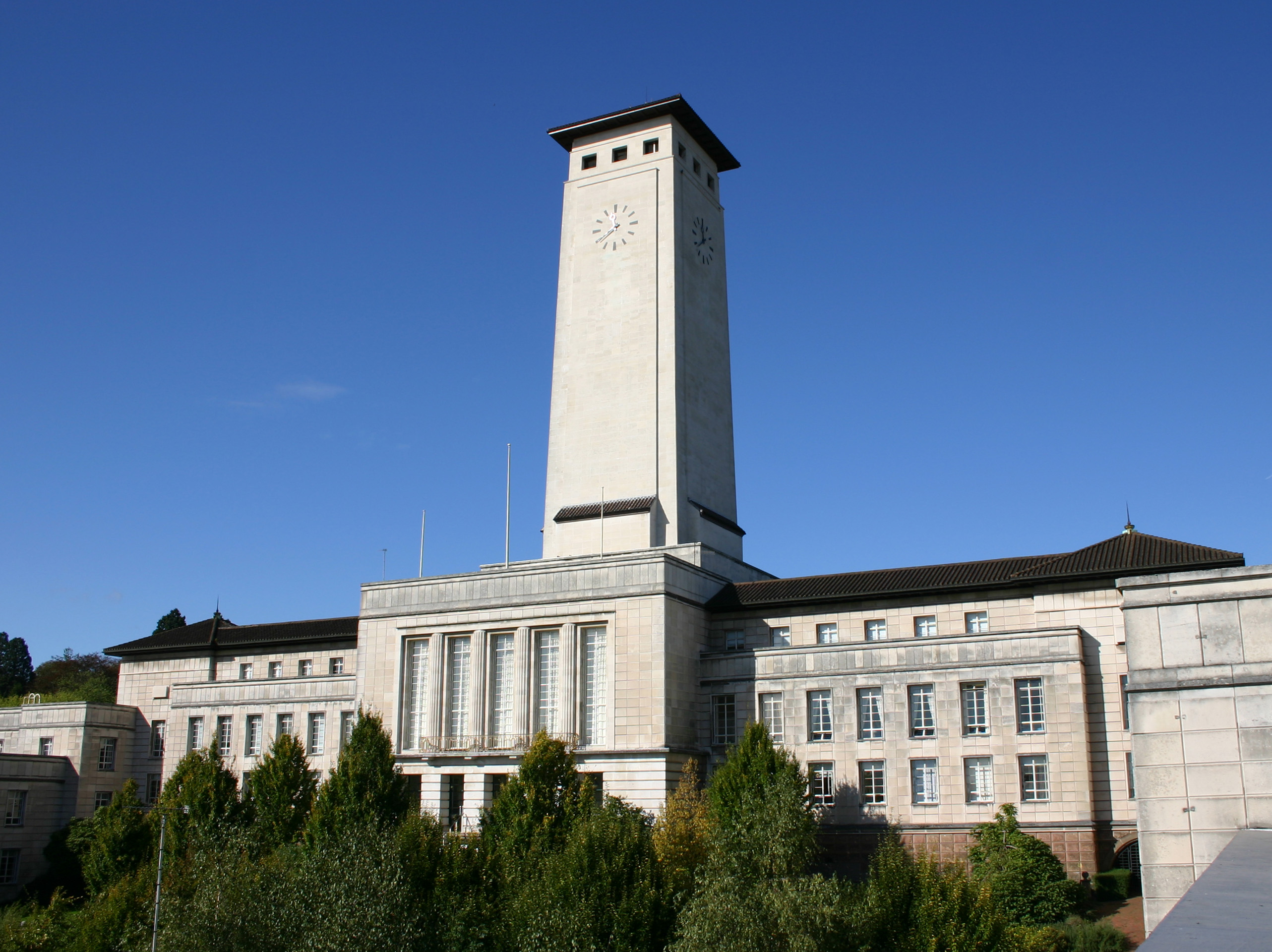
Newport Civic Centre

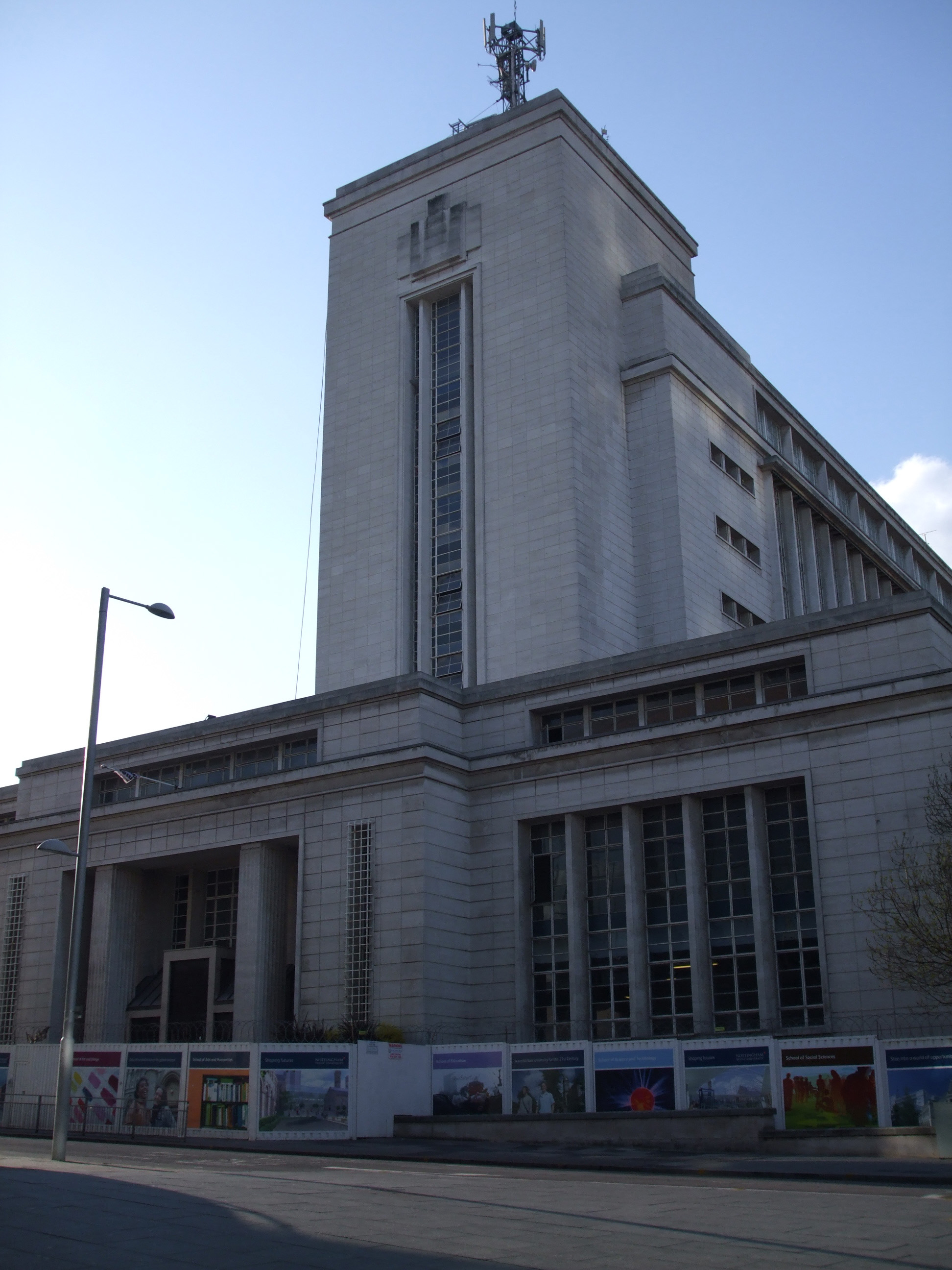
Nottingham & District Technical College

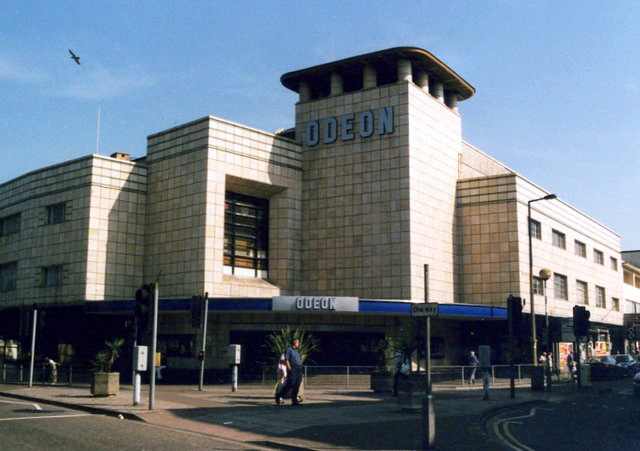
Odeon Cinema, Weston-super-Mare

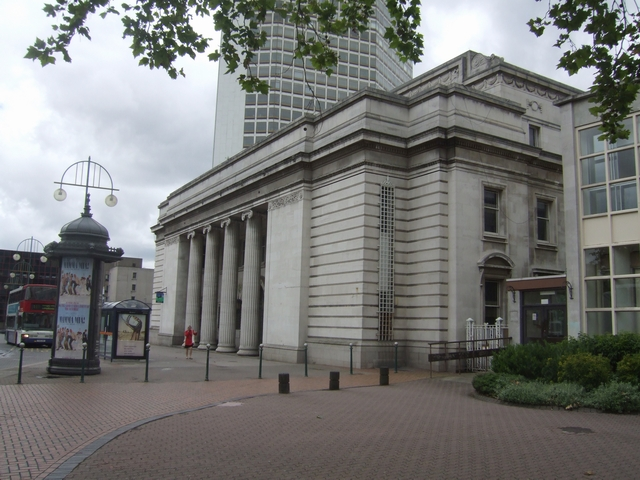
Birmingham Municipal Savings Bank - Broad Street Head Office

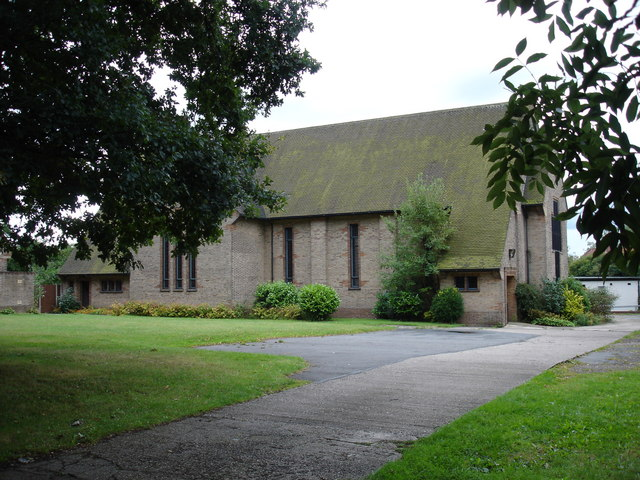
St Barnabas Church, Lenton Abbey, Nottingham

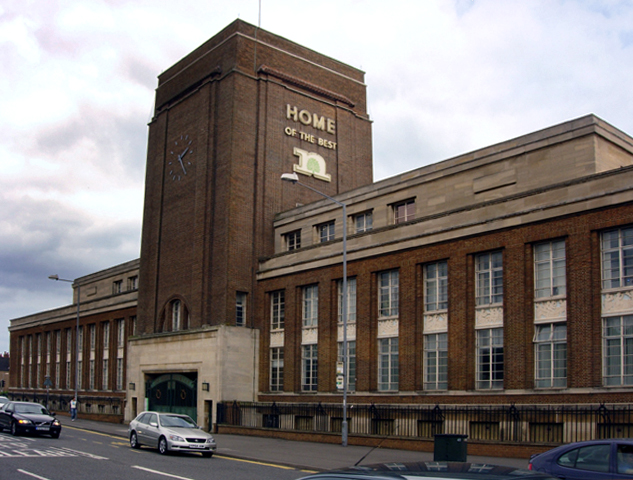
Home Brewery, Daybrook, Nottingham

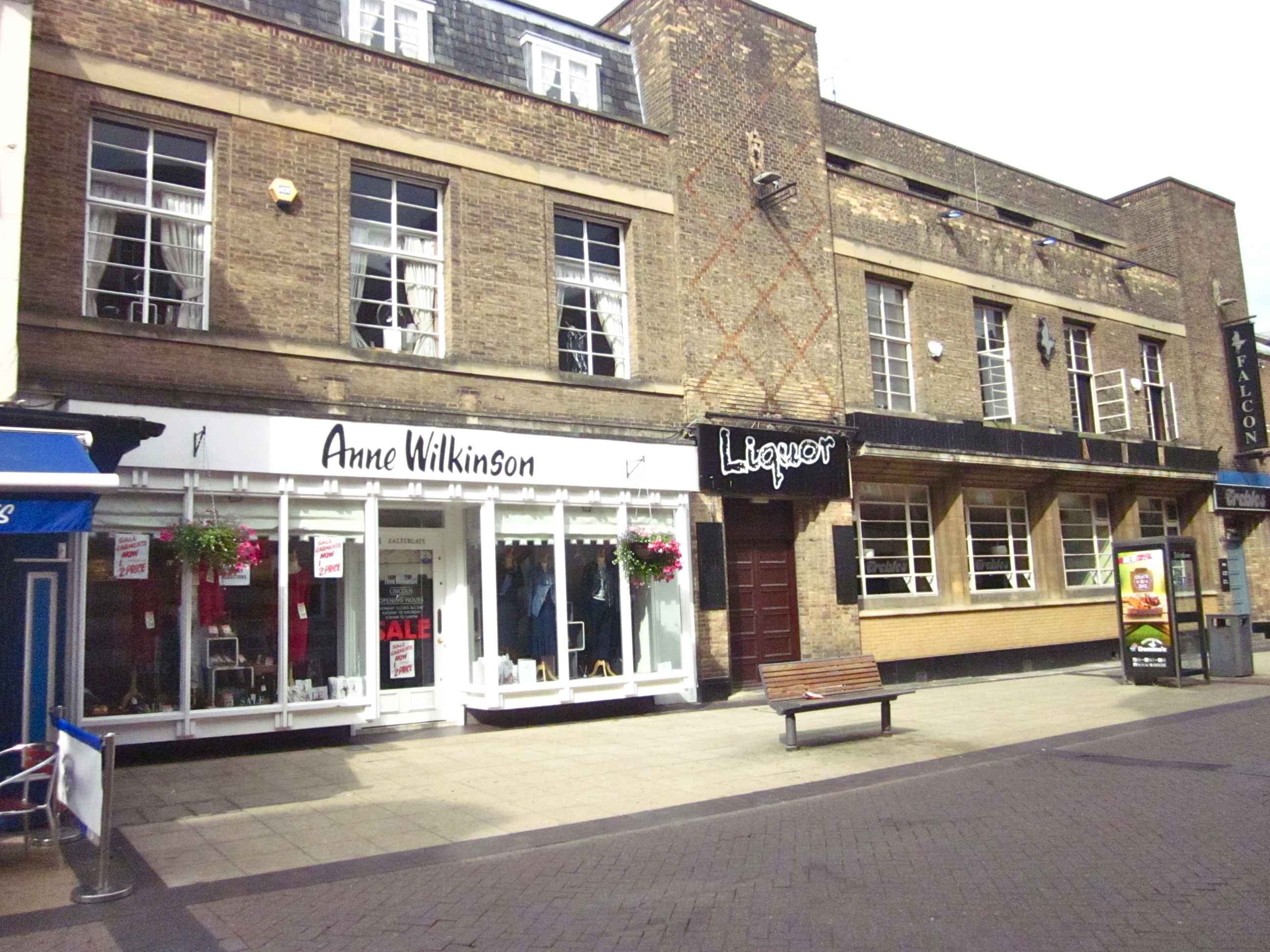
Falcon Hotel, Lincoln 1937-8

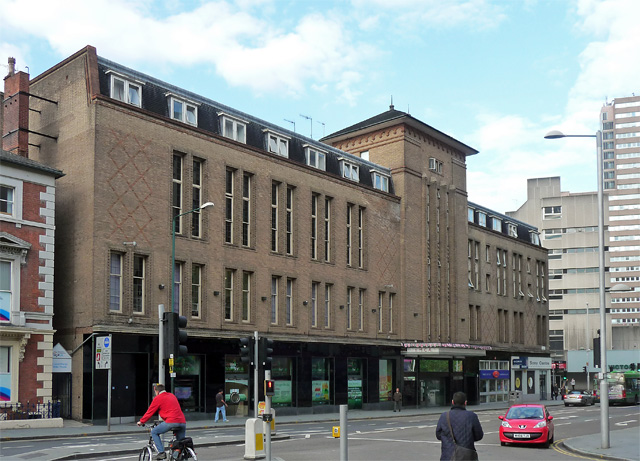
YMCA, Mansfield Road, Nottingham 1937
- Approximately 6000 municipally-owned houses for rent, Nottingham (1919–30)
- Council House, Exchange Buildings and Processional Way, Nottingham (1924–29)
- Raleigh Cycle Company Head Office, Lenton Boulevard, Nottingham (opened 1931) - awarded RIBA Bronze Medal 1933
- Martin's Bank, Market Street, Nottingham (1930)
- Birmingham Municipal Bank Head Office, Broad Street, Birmingham (1931–34)
- Mary Hardstaff Almshouses, Arnold Lane, Nottingham (1934)
- Fairholme Estate, Bedfont, Greater London (1930–35) – An Arts and Crafts style almshouse development of 72 homes arranged in a quadrangle with a central community hall, noted for its early communal hot water system. Grade II listed.
- Odeon Cinema, Warley, Worcestershire (exterior only - 1934)
- Odeon Cinema, Weston-super-Mare (opened May 1935) Grade II listed
- YMCA, Mansfield Road, Nottingham, "North German style with diapering, pylons to the squat pyramidal tower; vitrolite ground floor." 1937. Grade II listed. Remarkably similar to the Falcon, Lincoln but more massive. Asymmetrical tower, Mansard roof with dormers and use of contrasting red brick diaper work.
- The Falcon Hotel, 4 Saltergate, Lincolnshire. Rebuilt the hotel for the Home Brewery Co. in 1937/8.
- The Vale Public House, Mansfield Road, Daybrook, Nottingham (1935-37)
- Baskerville House, Centenary Square, Birmingham (1935–39)
- Home Brewery Head Office, Mansfield Road, Daybrook, Nottingham (1936)
- Odeon Cinema, Clacton-on-Sea, Essex (opened May 1936)
- Odeon Cinema, Bridgwater, Somerset (opened July 1936)
- Woolwich Equitable Building Society, 4-9, South Parade, Nottingham (1936-37)
- Civic Centre, Newport, Monmouthshire (1936–67)
- YMCA, Shakespeare Street, Nottingham (1937)
- St. Mary's Church, Wollaton Park, Nottingham (1937–39)
- St. Barnabas' Church, Lenton Abbey, Nottingham (1937–39)
- Odeon Cinema, Bristol (opened July 1938)
- The Oxclose Public House, Oxclose Lane, Nottingham (1939)
- Staythorpe 'A' Power Station, near Newark, Notts (from 1946) - awarded RIBA Bronze Medal 1953, now demolished
- 13 cottages in Staythorpe for the workers at Staythorpe 'A' Power Station. Three for Managers off Pingley Close and ten for staff aptly named Behay Gardens based on the B.E.A of the British Electricity Authority.
- Nightingale Hall, University of Nottingham (1946–56)
- Portland Building, University of Nottingham (1951–56)
- Nottingham & District Technical College (now Newton Building, Nottingham Trent University), Burton Street, Nottingham (1956–58)

=== Selected unbuilt designs ===
- Civic Centre, Yeovil, Somerset (1938–39) - works cancelled by war.
- Head Office, British Electricity Authority, Bramcote, Nottingham (1956)

== Later years ==
Howitt was actively involved in RIBA matters during the 1950s; effectively leaving the practice in the hands of partners Philip Gerrard and Frederick Woolley. Indeed, the name of the practice was changed to Cecil Howitt & Partners in 1948. Howitt retired from architectural practice in April 1962.

Cecil Howitt died aged 79 in September 1968; in the house he designed for himself, The Cottage, Lombard Street, Orston, Nottinghamshire.

== Sources ==
- Beckett, John; Brand, Ken (2004). The Council House, Nottingham and Old Market Square. Nottingham: Nottingham Civic Society. ISBN 1-902443-09-8.
- Pevsner, Nikolaus (1979). Nottinghamshire (2001 2nd rev. ed.). New Haven, Connecticut: Yale University Press. ISBN 0300096364.
- Scoffham, Ernie (1992). A vision of the city: the architecture of T.C. Howitt. Nottingham: Nottinghamshire County Council Leisure Services. ISBN 0-900943-44-0.
