= Samuel Curtis =

English botanist & publisher (1779–1860)

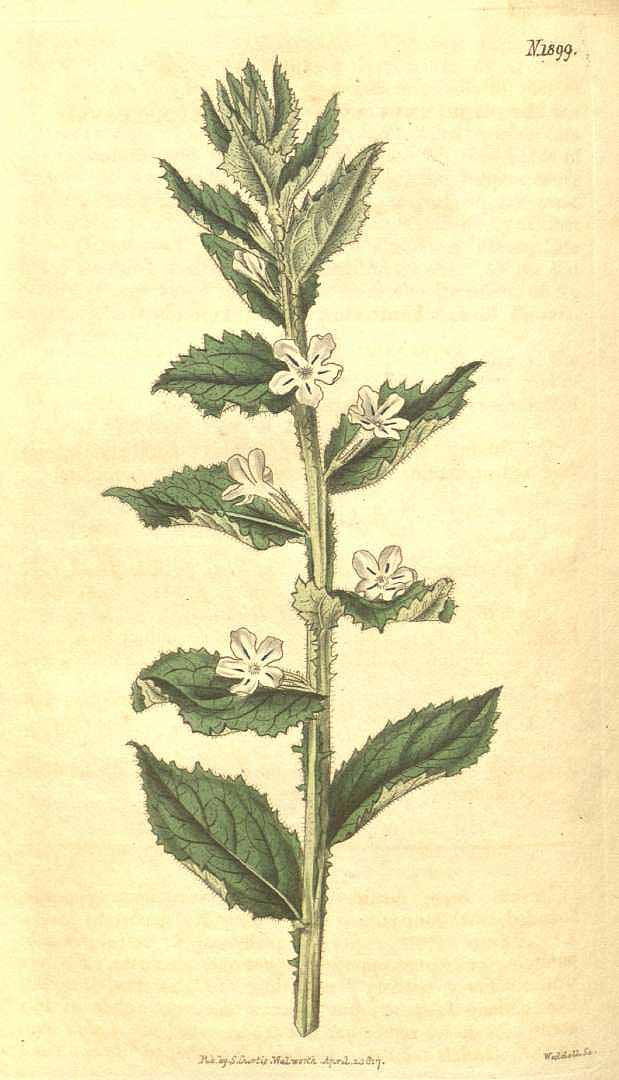
Oftia africana

Samuel Curtis (born in Walworth, Surrey on 29 August 1779-died at La Chaire, Rozel Bay, Jersey, on 6 January 1860) was an English botanist and publisher who specialised in Spermatophytes.

== Life ==
In 1801 he married the only daughter of William Curtis, author of Flora Londinensis, and founder of Curtis's Botanical Magazine, and so succeeded to the magazine's proprietorship; she died in 1827. Not long after that he moved to Glazenwood, near Coggeshall in Essex. The editorship of the magazine’ was resigned by John Sims in 1826, William Hooker succeeding him.

About 1846 Curtis sold his rights in the magazine, when lithography was about to supersede plate-printing. He retired to an estate he had bought, La Chaire, at Rozel in Jersey, where he died on 6 January 1860.

== See also ==
- The Arboretum, Nottingham
