= Newport Civic Centre =

Municipal Building in Newport, Wales

- Canolfan Ddinesig Casnewydd
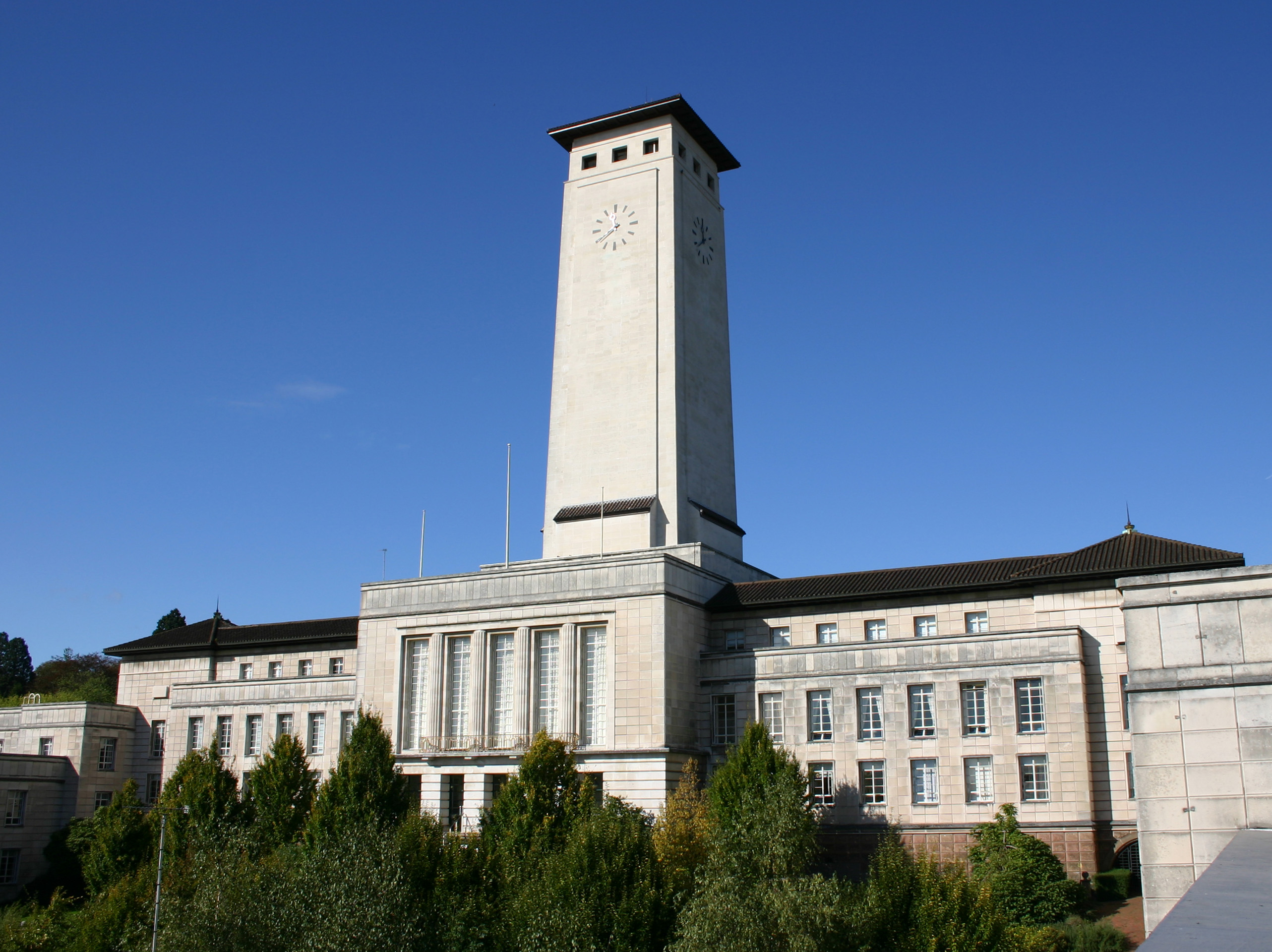
- The south elevation of the building

General information
- Architectural style: Art Deco

Listed Building – Grade II*
- Official name: Newport Civic Centre
- Designated: 14 September 1999
- Reference no.: 22333
- Location: Newport, United Kingdom
- Coordinates: 51.588713°N 3.006011°W
- Construction started: 1937
- Completed: 1964
- Client: Newport Corporation

Height
- Height: 55 metres (180 ft)

Design and construction
- Architect: Thomas Cecil Howitt

Newport Civic Centre (Welsh: Canolfan Ddinesig Casnewydd) is a municipal building in Godfrey Road in Newport, South Wales. The civic centre, which is the headquarters of Newport City Council, is a Grade II* Listed building.

== History ==
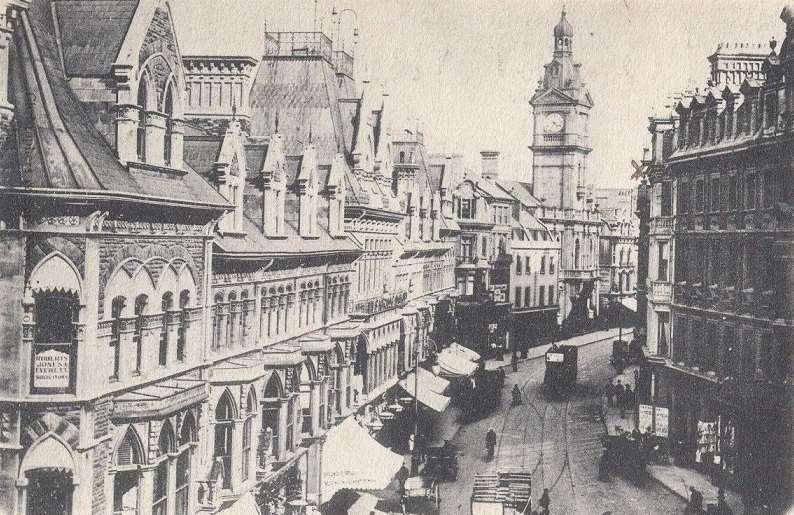
The old town hall in Commercial Street built in 1885 which featured a 150 feet (46 m) high tower

The first town hall, which was located in Commercial Street and designed in the classical style, was officially opened on 31 January 1843; after this was found to be too small it was replaced a second structure, also in Commercial Street, which was designed by Thomas Meakin Lockwood in the Renaissance style and completed in 1885. After deciding the second town hall was also inadequate for their needs, civic leaders chose to procure a new civic centre: the site they selected had previously been occupied by a property known as St Mary's Lodge in Fields Road.

The ceremonial first sod on the new building was cut by King George VI, accompanied by Queen Elizabeth, on 14 July 1937. Following a design competition, it was designed by Thomas Cecil Howitt in the Art Deco style and built using Portland stone. Progress was delayed by the advent of the Second World War but resumed after the war: the building was fitted out, a collection of 12 murals by the German artist Hans Feibusch were installed and the clock tower was finished. The building, which Newman in The Buildings of Wales described as "something of a disappointment", finally opened in 1964.

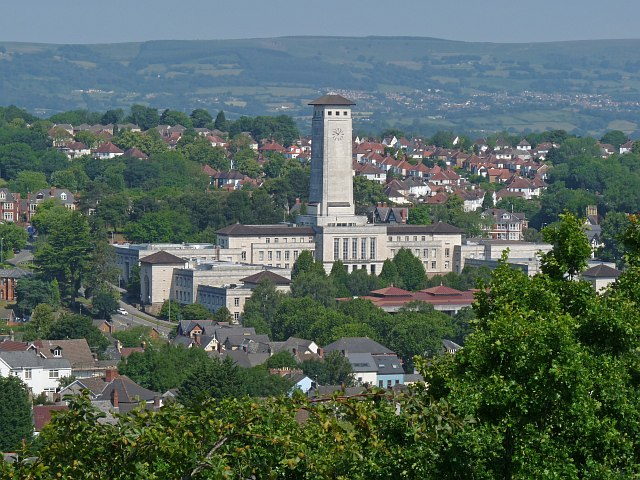
The entirety of the complex from afar. (The two red hipped roofs amongst the trees are those of Newport Crown Court.)

The design involved a very wide symmetrical frontage with 37 bays facing Fields Road; the central section of five bays featured a huge full-height round-headed entrance on the ground floor and a clock tower above; there were wings to the east and west, each of seven bays, and beyond that there were side bays, each of nine bays. The clock tower itself rises 55 m (180 feet) above ground level from the front of the building. A court complex was built to the south of the main building between 1989 and 1991. Internally, the principal rooms were the council chamber and the mayor's parlour. The building was the meeting place of Newport Borough Council until the town was granted formal city status as part of a contest for the Queen's Golden Jubilee in 2002 and the building then became the home of Newport City Council.

A sandstone plaque to commemorate the 2010 Ryder Cup at the Celtic Manor Resort, which had been placed in the pavement outside the civic centre, was unveiled on 7 October 2011. Works of art in the civic centre include a sculpture by David Evans depicting two straining miners entitled "Labour".
