= Mary Hardstaff Homes =

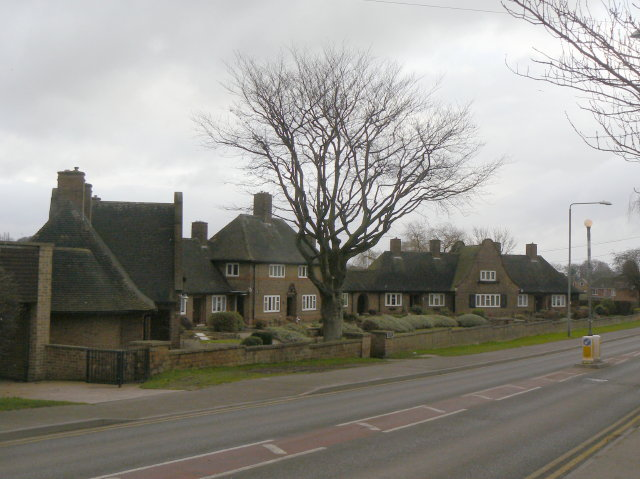

- Location within Nottinghamshire
- 52°58′45.45″N 1°5′5.13″W
- Location: Carlton, Nottingham, Nottinghamshire, England

History
- Built: 1936
- Built for: Mary Hardstaff

Site notes
- Architect: Thomas Cecil Howitt

Listed Building – Grade II

The Mary Hardstaff Homes, are 10 almshouses on Arnold Lane in Gedling, Nottingham.

These were built as Almshouses in 1936 for the widows and orphans of miners by the builders Greenwoods of Mansfield. The design by the architect Thomas Cecil Howitt won the RIBA Bronze Medal in 1936 from the Nottingham, Derby and Lincoln Architectural Society.
