= Newport Crown Court =

Judicial building in Newport, Wales

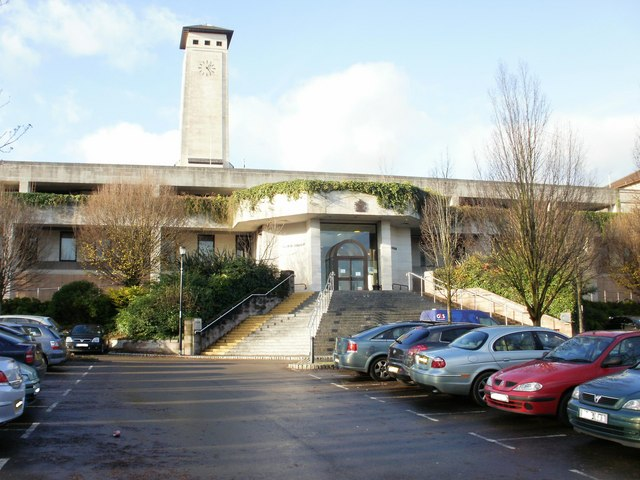
- Newport Crown Court

- Shown in Newport
- 51.5884°N 3.0050°W
- Location: Faulkner Road, Newport

History
- Built: 1991

Site notes
- Architectural style: Modern style

Newport Crown Court is a Crown Court venue which deals with criminal cases at Faulkner Road in Newport in South Wales.

== History ==
Until the early 1990s, judicial hearings in Newport were held in the west wing of Newport Civic Centre. However, as the number of court cases in southeast Wales grew, it became necessary to commission a dedicated courthouse for criminal matters. The site chosen was a sloped and landscaped area to the immediate southeast of the Civic Centre. Construction of the new building commenced in 1989. It was designed in the modern style, built in Portland stone at a cost of £10.9 million, and was completed in 1991.

The design involved a symmetrical main frontage of seven bays facing onto Faulkner Road. The central bay featured a long flight of steps leading up to a hexagonal porch. The wings, of three bays each, featured a series of piers which supported a concrete roof with was cantilevered forward. The building was laid out to accommodate three courtrooms which were designated for the use by the County Court (civil cases) as well as the Crown Court (criminal cases).

Notable cases included the trial and conviction of Carl Mills, in July 2013, for the murder of three generations of one family, the trial and conviction of Andrew McCann, a former member of the Hells Angels Motorcycle Club, in November 2015, for "using threatening, abusive and insulting words or behaviour", the trial and conviction of Joseph Jeremy and Lewis Aquilina, in March 2022, for the murder of a 26-year-old man during a street robbery, and the trial and conviction of Simon Parks, in November 2022, for the murder of his mother-in-law.
