= Frank Beckett Lewis =

English architect

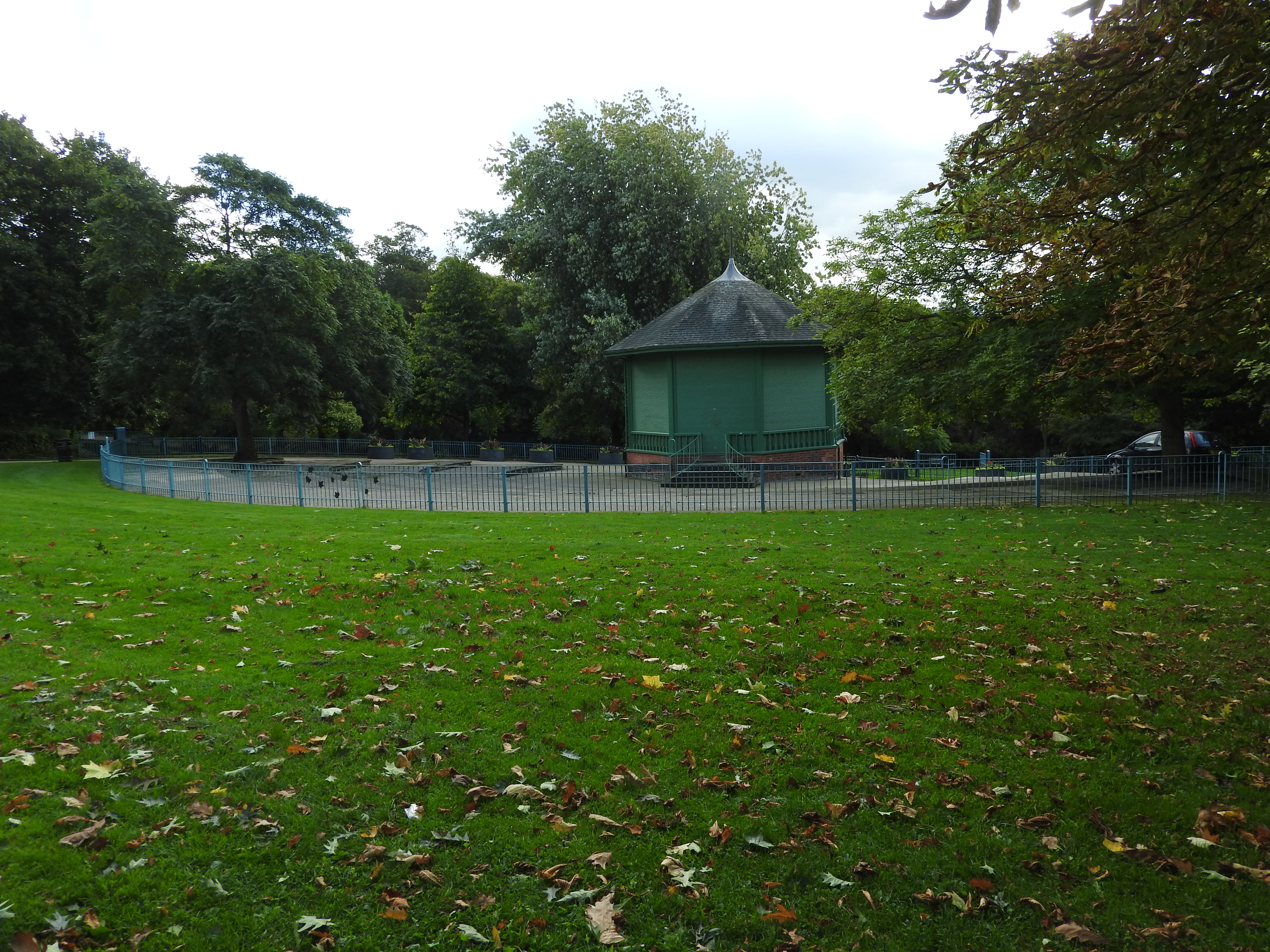
Nottingham Arboretum bandstand 1907

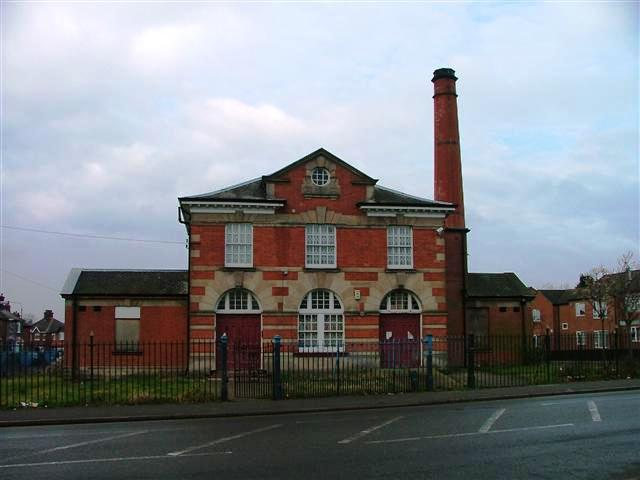
Bulwell Baths, Vernon Road, Nottingham 1908

Frank Beckett Lewis ARIBA (27 September 1861 – 1 November 1932) was an English architect based in Nottingham.

== Career ==
He was born on 27 September 1861 in Nottingham, the son of William Lewis (Cork Merchant) and Elizabeth. He was articled to Arthur Forsell Kirby of Nottingham from 1877 to 1882. He then became assistant to Thomas Chambers Hine and George Thomas Hine where he stayed until 1886. He then moved to be the Deputy Borough Engineer in Nottingham under Arthur Brown.

In 1888 he was appointed an Associate of the Royal Institute of British Architects.

He was appointed Nottingham City Architect in 1901, a position he held until 1912 when he was succeeded by his assistant, Arthur Dale.

He died on 1 November 1932 and left an estate valued at £8,416 9s 11d.

== Notable works ==
- Meadows New Recreation Ground and Sports Pavilion
- Vernon Park
- Nottingham Castle extension of the grounds
- Bulwell Hall laying out the grounds for golf, cricket and football
- King Edward Park, Carlton Road, Nottingham
- Radford Recreation Ground, Ilkeston Road, Nottingham 1904
- Elementary School, Sneinton 1904
- Recreation Ground, Sycamore Road, Nottingham
- Recreation Ground, Coppice Road, Nottingham 1905
- Playground, Pennyfoot Street, Nottingham 1906
- Pavilion, Bulwell Forest, Nottingham 1906
- School, Albert Street, Bulwell 1906
- Suspension Bridge, Wilford, Nottingham 1906 (with Arthur Brown)
- Band Stand, Nottingham Arboretum 1907
- Schools, Sneinton Boulevard, Nottingham 1908 (now Windmill L.E.A.D Academy)
- Bulwell Baths, Vernon Road, Nottingham 1908
- Forest Recreation Ground, Nottingham 1908-09 (conversion of the racecourse)
- Trent Bridge School 1909
- Schools, Haydn Road, Nottingham
- Schools, Berridge Road, Nottingham
