= Plaza Cinema, Weston-super-Mare =

Cinema in Weston-Super-Mare, Somerset, England

Coordinates: 51.3473°N 2.9781°W

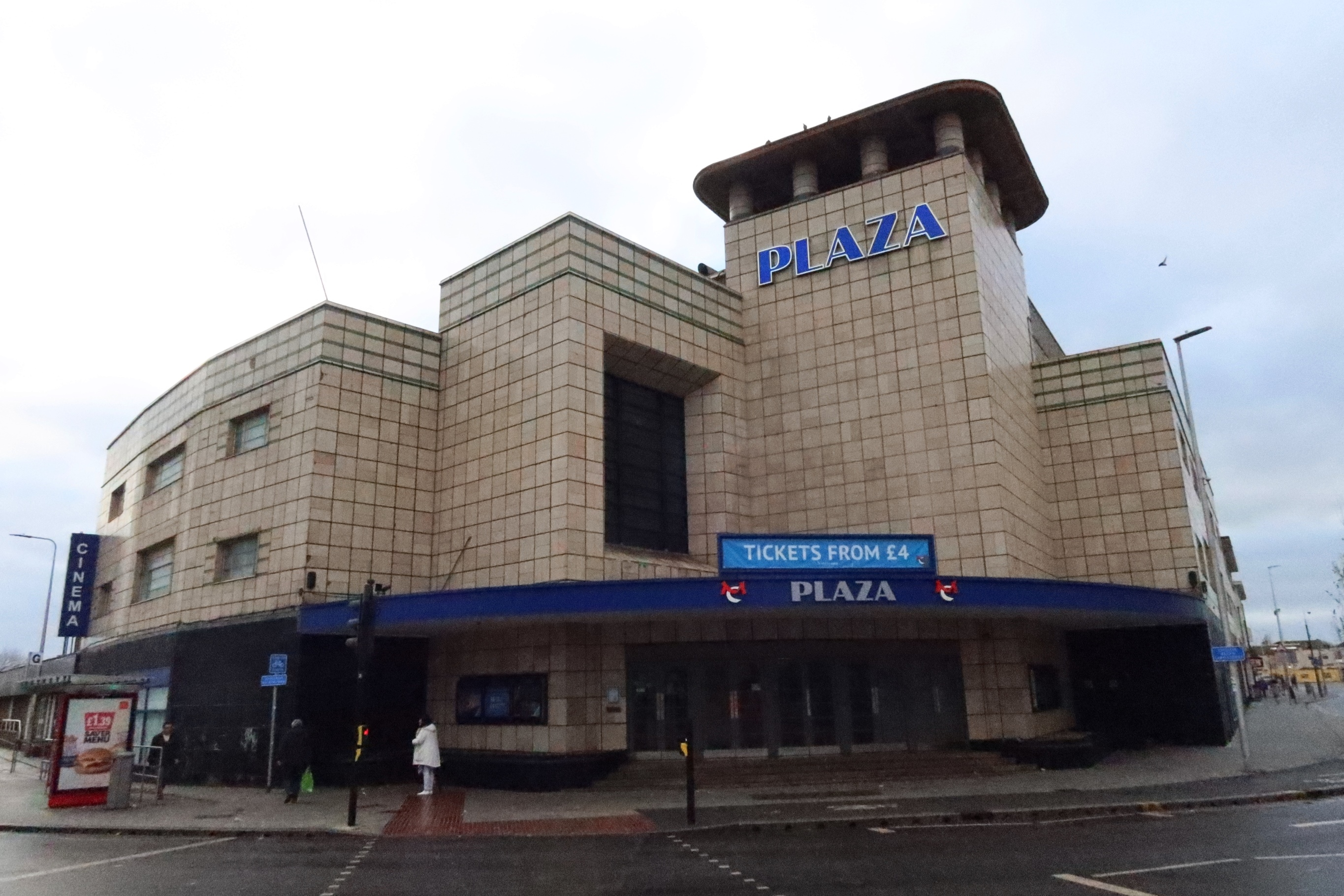
The cinema in 2024

The Plaza Cinema is an art deco cinema in Weston-super-Mare, Somerset, owned by Merlin Cinemas. It was built by Odeon Cinemas and known as the Odeon Weston-super-Mare until 2023. It was designed by Thomas Cecil Howitt and is a Grade II listed building.

== History ==
An 'Electric Cinema' opened in 1911. Among the films that it showed were ones created by its own staff, such as one of 'B.C. Hucks at Weston-super-Mare' which showed the first aeroplane crossing of the Bristol Channel. The site was redeveloped in 1934 by Odeon Cinemas and opened in 1935. T Cecil Howitt was chosen as the architect, this being one of four Odeon cinemas that he designed. The others were the Odeon Cinema, Bridgwater (1936) and at Warley (1934) and Clacton (1936). They all had similar 'moderne' features with a square tower with a flat slab supported by columns and a squat main building.

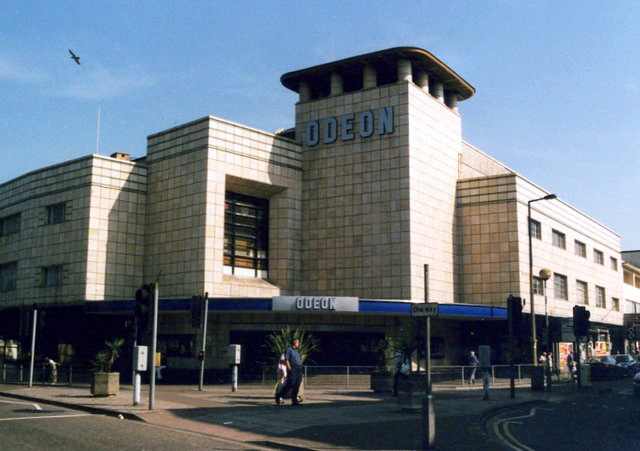
The cinema in 2003 when it was still an Odeon. Locking Road to the left and Walliscote Road to the right.

It was built in a prominent location on the corner of Walliscote Road (also known at this end as The Centre) and Locking Road facing towards Regent Street. Three small shops were incorporated into the cinema on the Walliscote Road frontage and one on Locking Road. They were known as the 'Odeon Buildings' and occupied by a variety of independent businesses. For example, in 1970 they were used by a stamp dealer, ladies clothier, laundry and (in Locking Road) a sports outfitter. They ceased to be used as shops many years before the Odeon cinema closed in 2023.

The cinema contained single screen with two floors of seating when built but this was later changed. The main auditorium was split into two levels and two small studio auditoria were created under the original balcony. Much of the original interior was retained during the rebuilding including, in the main lower screen, the theatre organ by Compton. The building was awarded Grade-II listed status on 21 August 1986.

The Beatles played two shows each day at the venue for six days from 22 July 1963.

The cinema closed as the Odeon on 5 June 2023 because Odeon Cinemas considered it no longer viable. It was purchased by Merlin Cinemas in August and reopened as the Plaza Cinema on 15 December.

== Description ==
=== Exterior ===
In Weston, the tower is positioned at the corner of the site, above and behind the foyer. A curved canopy projects outwards from the slab tower, while the foyer is accessed from the street via four circular steps leading to five sets of double doors. Howitt used a second smaller tower to the left of the slab tower (when looking towards the building from Regent Street), with a large double-height metal framed window. There are two three storey high wings which enclosed the original single auditorium, allowing commercial revenue from shop units at street level and offices above. The Regent Street elevation comprises three bays with Crittall-style metal framed windows, while the Walliscote Road elevation comprises five bays. There was an additional canopy along both elevations, but these were later removed.

The facade of the building is covered in biscuit-coloured faience, except the shop areas on both wings which are clad in black glass Vitrolite panels. The basket-weave pattern faience encompasses three horizontal bands of green faience. At night neon lighting placed in line with the green faience, around the 'Odeon' and along the edge of the canopies provided an a-typical Art Deco attractive feel to the building. The original Odeon lettering has been replaced, despite this occurring after the building was listed.

=== Interior ===
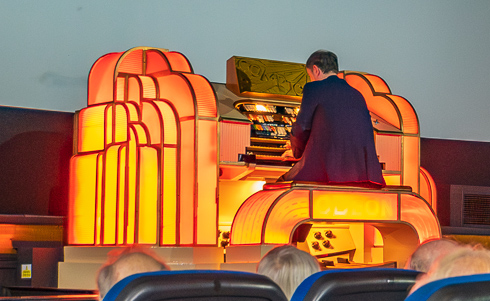
The Compton organ

The original split-level auditorium was split into three smaller units in 1973, with a fourth screen added in 1991. Many of the original art deco features however survive, including the Compton organ.

The Compton organ was installed during the original fitting out of the building in 1935. The 3manual/6rank instrument is the only Compton theatre pipe organ in an Odeon cinema outside London. The six ranks of pipes are: Tuba; Tibia Clausa; Vox Humana; Oboe; Flute; Cello. Although the organ does not have the common Compton feature of a Melotone, it does have a rare Solo Cello stop which involves a mechanical bow and pitching fingers, operated directly from the organ console. The organ today is preserved under the care of the West of England Theatre Organ Society.
