= Merlin Cinemas =

British cinema chain

Merlin Cinemas Limited
- Industry: Entertainment (movie theatres)
- Founded: 1990; 36 years ago
- Founder: Geoff Greaves MBE
- Headquarters: Redruth, Cornwall
- Number of locations: 22 cinemas
- Area served: South West England; Northern Scotland; North East Wales; North East England
- Website: merlincinemas.co.uk

Merlin Cinemas Limited are a British cinema chain. The company was formed in 1990 and predominantly operates in small coastal towns.

Merlin Cinemas mainly operate traditional cinema buildings rather than new builds.

In 2023 Merlin Cinemas acquired the Odeon cinema in Weston-super-Mare, North Somerset, and renamed it Plaza Cinema. The cinema had been deemed financially unviable by Odeon.

== Locations ==
Merlin Cinemas currently own 22 venues containing nearly 70 screens across the UK.

Region	Town/City	Name of Venue	No. of screens
Cornwall	Bodmin	Capitol Cinema	4
Cornwall	Helston	Flora Cinema	2
Cornwall	Falmouth	Phoenix Cinema	5
Cornwall	Redruth	Regal Cinema	6
Cornwall	St. Ives	Royal Cinema	3
Cornwall	Penzance	Savoy Cinema	4
Cornwall	Penzance	The Ritz	1
Devon	Ilfracombe	Embassy Cinema	3
Devon	Kingsbridge	Kings Cinema	3
Devon	Okehampton	New Carlton Cinema	3
Devon	Torquay	New Central Cinema	4
Devon	Tiverton	Tivoli Cinema	1
Gloucestershire	Coleford	Studio Cinema	2
Norfolk	Cromer	Regal Movieplex	4
North Yorkshire	Redcar	The Regent	3
Somerset	Weston-super-Mare	Plaza Cinema	4
Somerset	Wellington	Wellesley Cinema	1
Scotland	Ayr	Astoria Cinema	4
Scotland	Thurso	Merlin Cinema	5
Scotland	Galashiels	Pavilion Cinema	4
Wales	Prestatyn	Scala Cinema	2
Wales	Rhyl	Strand Cinema	5

== Regal Cinema, Redruth ==
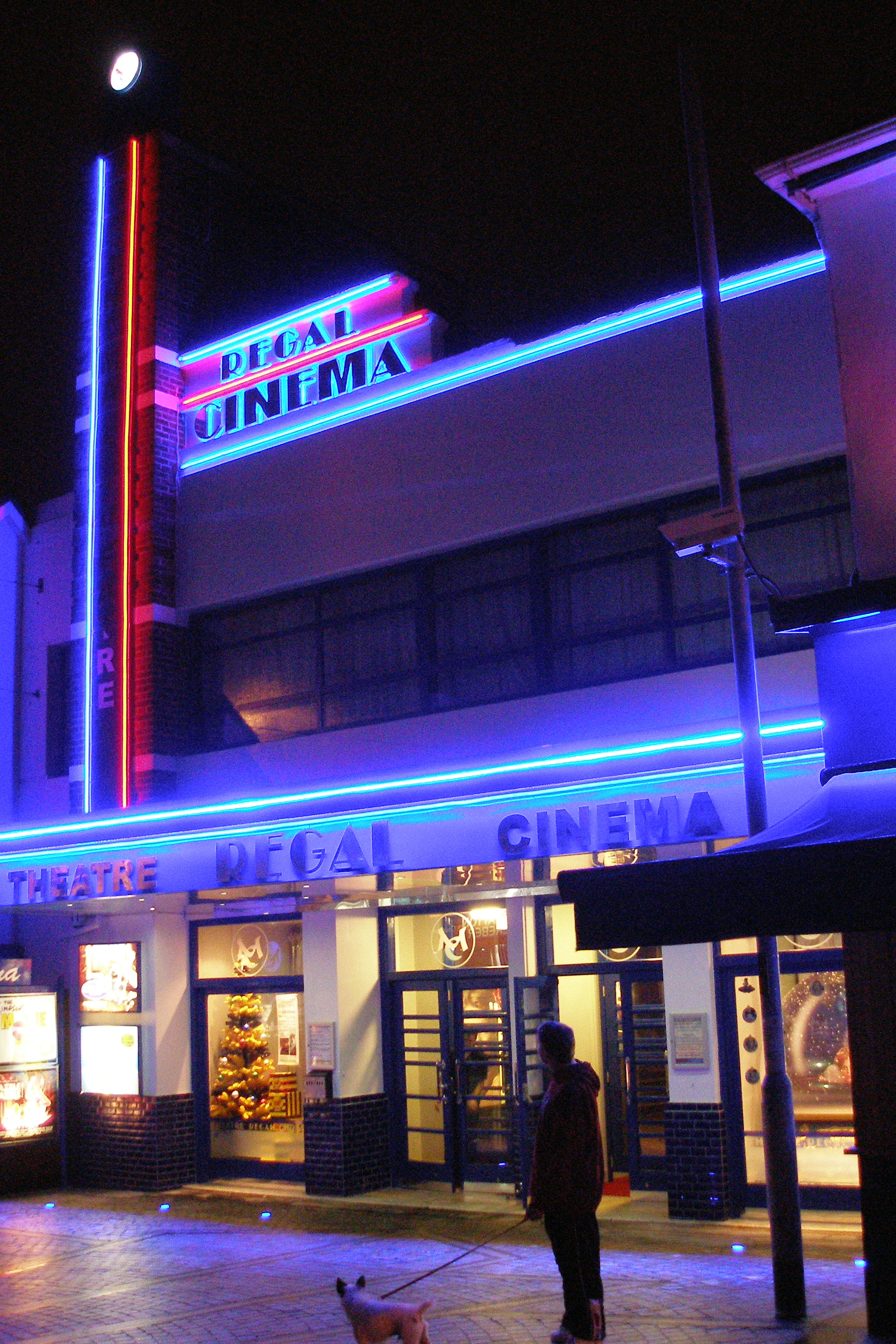
The Regal Cinema in Redruth

Merlin Cinemas's flagship venue is Regal in Redruth, Cornwall, England, in the United Kingdom. The cinema opened on 2 December 1935, with seating for 982 on a semi-stadium plan. It was opened by Mr Prance as part of Sound & Movement Cinemas. The original sound system was by British Thomson-Houston. In the 1960s the cinema was equipped with CinemaScope and stereophonic sound.

When the Cornwall Circuit Group of cinemas were taken over by The Rank Group, the cinema was later sold off to independent Vivian Bartle, and in 1983 the former café area was converted into an 80-seat screen 2. The auditorium was tripled in 1986 with seating for 600 front area (screen 3) and 172 (screen 2) & 121 (Screen 1) in the rear areas. It was taken over by Merlin Cinemas on 24 July 1998.

In August 2008 the exterior of the building was fully refurbished, including a new roof, with walls re-rendered and painted in blue with red stripes ( Merlin Cinemas, colour scheme).

April 2011 saw another phase of redevelopment at the Regal with two screens going digital, screen 7 (a licensed auditorium with leather arm chairs) and screen 3 boasting Dolby 3D.

During 2012–2013 the main auditorium, already the largest screen and auditorium in Cornwall, was subject to a £1.5 million transformation. Capacity increased to 650 and includes circle, stalls and box seats. To increase the number of screens from 4 to 6 the auditorium was partitioned, and two screens were placed underneath the circle. This was in addition to other work taken out on the other screens. All six screens were officially opened on 21 July 2013. All 6 screens are licensed for alcohol consumption.

=== Building ===
The exterior is a fine 1930s art deco design complete with tower and cinema name placed between horizontal strips. It was completely refurbished with new neon signage and outdoor under-pavement blue LED lighting during October and November 2007. The windows have been blocked in for the screen in the former café but the whole façade is still striking. Above the main entrance is Screen 7, which opened in 2006. This is accessed by a circular staircase from the bar and restaurant next door, and not through the main cinema entrance. In addition, Screen 7 is also unusual in having a licence, waiter service and double, sofa-style, seating and tables.

In the main foyer, which is circular in shape, the low ceiling commands you to observe the art deco design at the centre of the floor.

The plans were drawn up by an Australian architect called Mr Smith working for the Watkins Partnership in Bristol. The most striking feature is the fin structure (to the left of the frontage) that spreads upwards into the air above the cinema. The size of this fin runs about 23 feet into the building, (about the depth of the foyer). Originally, there was a glass-lit central feature rising the full height and according to the plan had the words "cinema & café" detailed into it. This feature today has been boxed over.

Inside, the foyer executes a visual trick. The auditorium is set at a different angle to the façade by roughly 25 degrees. By creating a circular foyer the architect has disguised this fact, as without obvious side and back walls the patrons were unlikely to notice the change in direction. From the foyer were doors to a small lounge (off to the left - originally they had gold-coloured rattan chairs and glass-topped rattan tables) and stairs to the café, above the foyer. Light gained entry to the café by the large windows running across the frontage, the kitchen was placed under the large fin structure with a single window beyond the fin.

From the foyer there are steps down to the vestibule, where a cloakroom and toilets were available before entering the fan-shaped auditorium. There was a front stalls entrance and foyer set to the left of the stage. The stage had an orchestra pit and 35' wide proscenium. The projection box was placed above the raised area of seating. It has also been reported that a colour-lit fountain was contained in the building, probably within the café. The walls of the cafe had drawings of deer and a young couple skating. The auditorium is quite plain with leaves painted on the side walls.

=== Controversies ===
In September 2026, Merlin Cinemas was named by HM Revenue and Customs (HMRC) among 658 UK employers that failed to pay the National Minimum Wage. The company ranked 10th on the list for underpaying 181 workers a total of £50,198.75. A company spokesperson acknowledged the findings, stating that the underpayments were unintentional and stemmed from payroll deductions for uniform costs and staff meal programs. Merlin Cinemas confirmed it had fully cooperated with HMRC, repaid all affected staff, and updated its payroll practices.
