= Beastmarket Hill =

Row of buildings in Nottingham, England

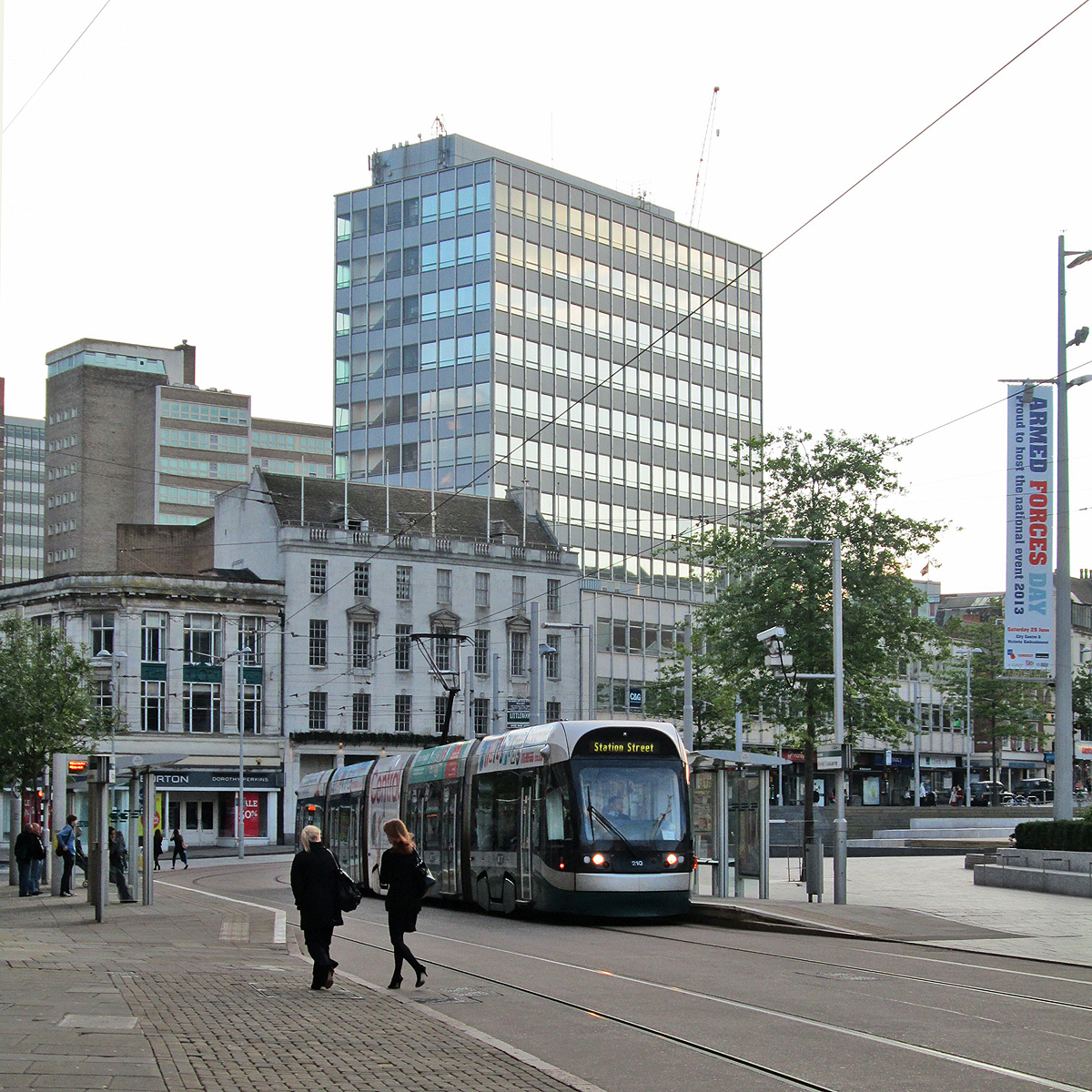
- Beastmarket Hill behind the tram

- Location within Nottingham
- Maintained by: Nottingham City Council
- Coordinates: 52.9531°N 1.1509°W

Beastmarket Hill is a row of buildings in Nottingham City Centre forming the west side of Old Market Square.

== History ==
Beastmarket Hill derives its name from being the site of the cattle market. It is bounded by St James’ Street to the north west and Friar Lane to the south east.

== Notable buildings ==
- 1 to 7, Lloyds Bank by Lloyds Bank Architects Department, 1966
- 8 to 10, Barclays Bank by W.A.S. Lloyd 1959
- 11 to 13, Burton's by Harry Wilson, 1923.
