= Old Market Square, Nottingham =

Square in Nottingham, England

Old Market Square
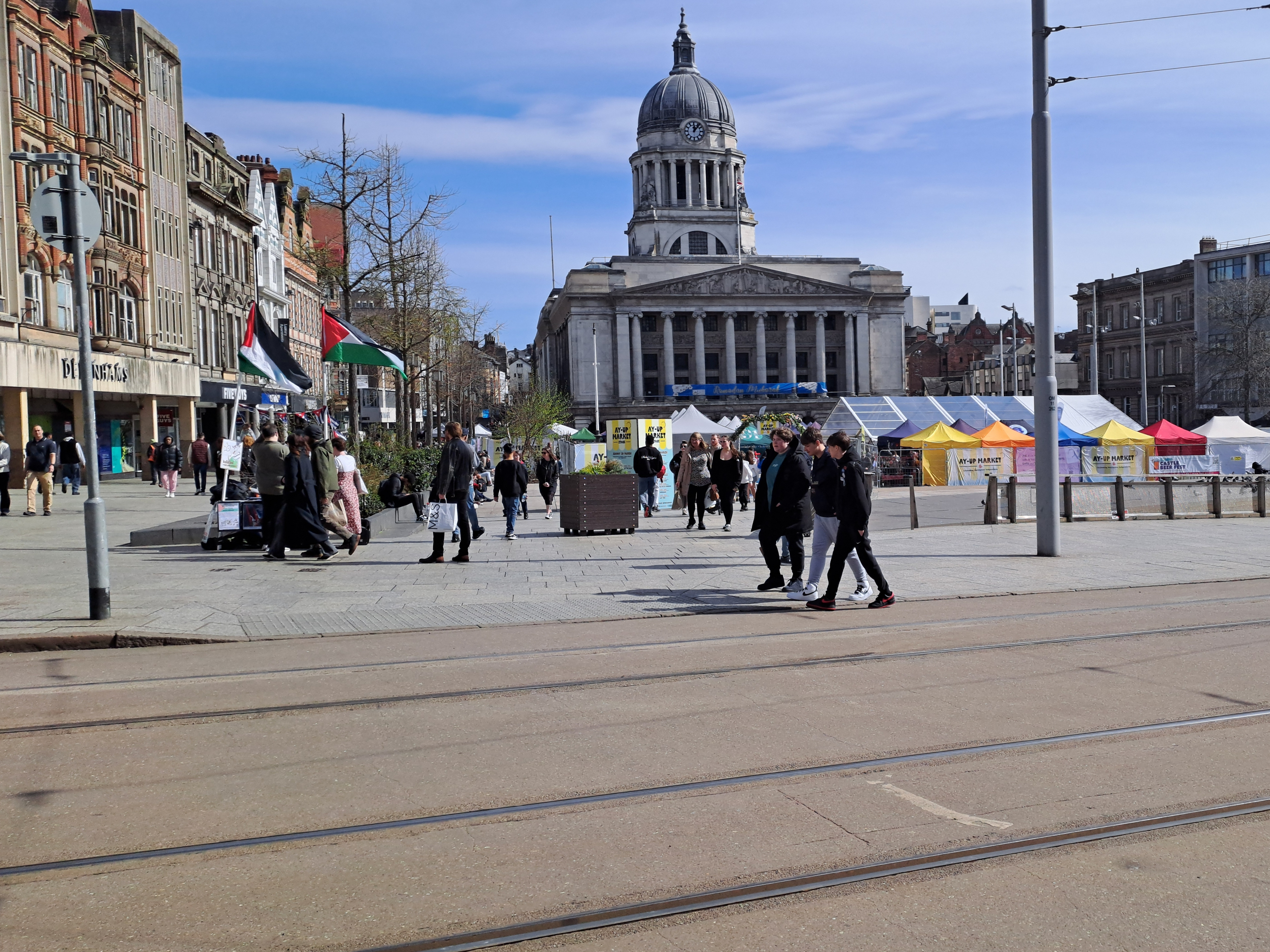
- Council House, Old Market Square

- Location within Nottingham
- Maintained by: Nottingham City Council
- Coordinates: 52.9534°N 1.1500°W

The Old Market Square is an open, pedestrianised city square in Nottingham, England, forming the heart of the city, and covering an area of approximately 12,000 square metres (130,000 sq ft), or about 3 acres (1.2 ha). It is one of the largest paved squares in the United Kingdom.

Located in the heart of Nottingham City Centre, the square is bounded by Beastmarket Hill to the West, Long Row to the North, and South Parade to the South. The Eastern end of the square is dominated by the Council House, which served as Nottingham's town hall until 2010, when the administration moved to the newly acquired Loxley House on Station Street.

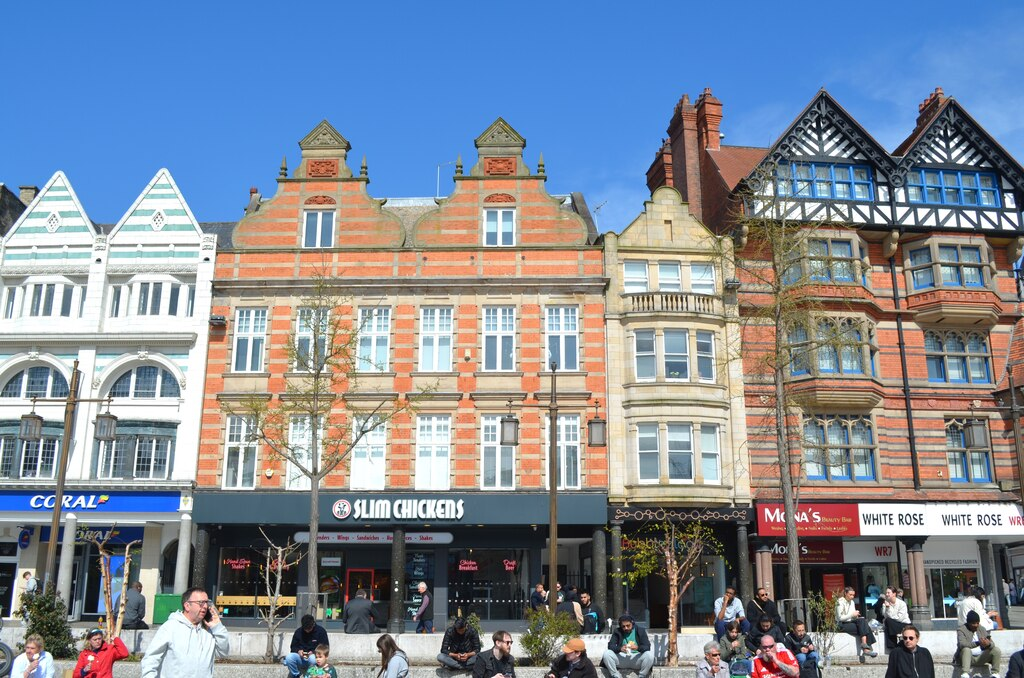
Long Row

The nature of the square means it is often used for large local events, fairs, concerts, exhibitions and vigils.

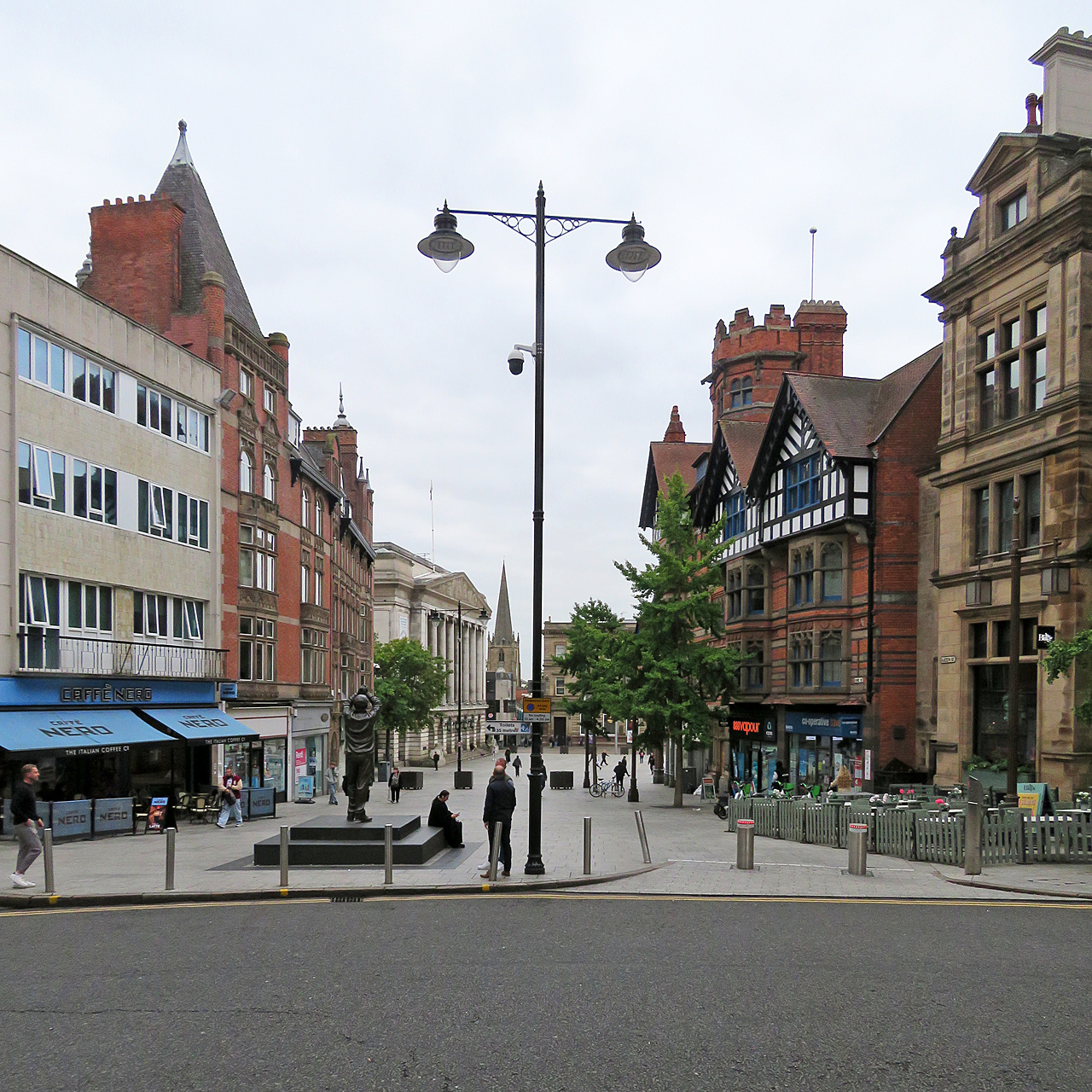
King Street leading to the Old Market Square

== History ==
The early market square, from the 11th century until 1928, covered an area of about 5.5 acres (22,260 square metres), with its narrow western edge near Mount Street, broadening out to its eastern edge, adjacent to High Street. The then perimeter was formed by what are now: Long Row West, Long Row, Long Row East, High Street, Poultry, South Parade, Beastmarket Hill, and Angel Row. Because of its size during these several centuries, it was frequently referred to as the, 'Great Market Place'.

This public square has long been at the centre of Nottingham life. In the early days before the City of Nottingham was formed, the area was the centre-point between the Norman town of Nottingham, situated around the Castle Rock, and the old Anglo-Saxon town which was based around the current Lace Market at St. Mary's Church, also called Snothryngham, Snottingaham or Snottingham. The central point between the two towns became a major market point, and hence the square has been at the centre of Nottingham's growth around it for hundreds of years since. The two towns were once divided by a wall. The old positioning of this historic wall was reinstated when the square was redesigned in the 2000s, with a stainless steel drainage channel down the centre of the square. This marks the Wall that divided the livestock from the agricultural feed and foodstuffs.

The square was the original setting of Nottingham Goose Fair, an annual fair held in October originating over 700 years ago. The Goose Fair was moved in 1928 for redevelopment of the square.

The square continues to be affectionately nicknamed 'Slab Square', in reference to the concrete slabs that made up the former Square, and the granite slabs in place after the 2007 redesign.

A number of Nottingham's defining moments have taken place in the square. One of the most significant civil protests to start here was the protest by Luddites (a social movement of British textile artisans) in the early nineteenth century, who protested growth in industrial machinery which was seen to be taking jobs. October 1831 saw rioting against the rejection of the Reform Bill and led to the destruction by fire of the 4th Duke of Newcastle's mansion house, which was built for the 2nd Duke in 1679 on the remaining foundations of the earlier medieval castle. The mansion house, the grounds, and the remaining fortifications including the renovated gatehouse, are referred to collectively as 'Nottingham Castle'. Also colloquially known as 'the Castle'. Trophies won by Nottingham Forest Football Club including the European Cup and the FA Cup have all been held aloft in front of crowds here.

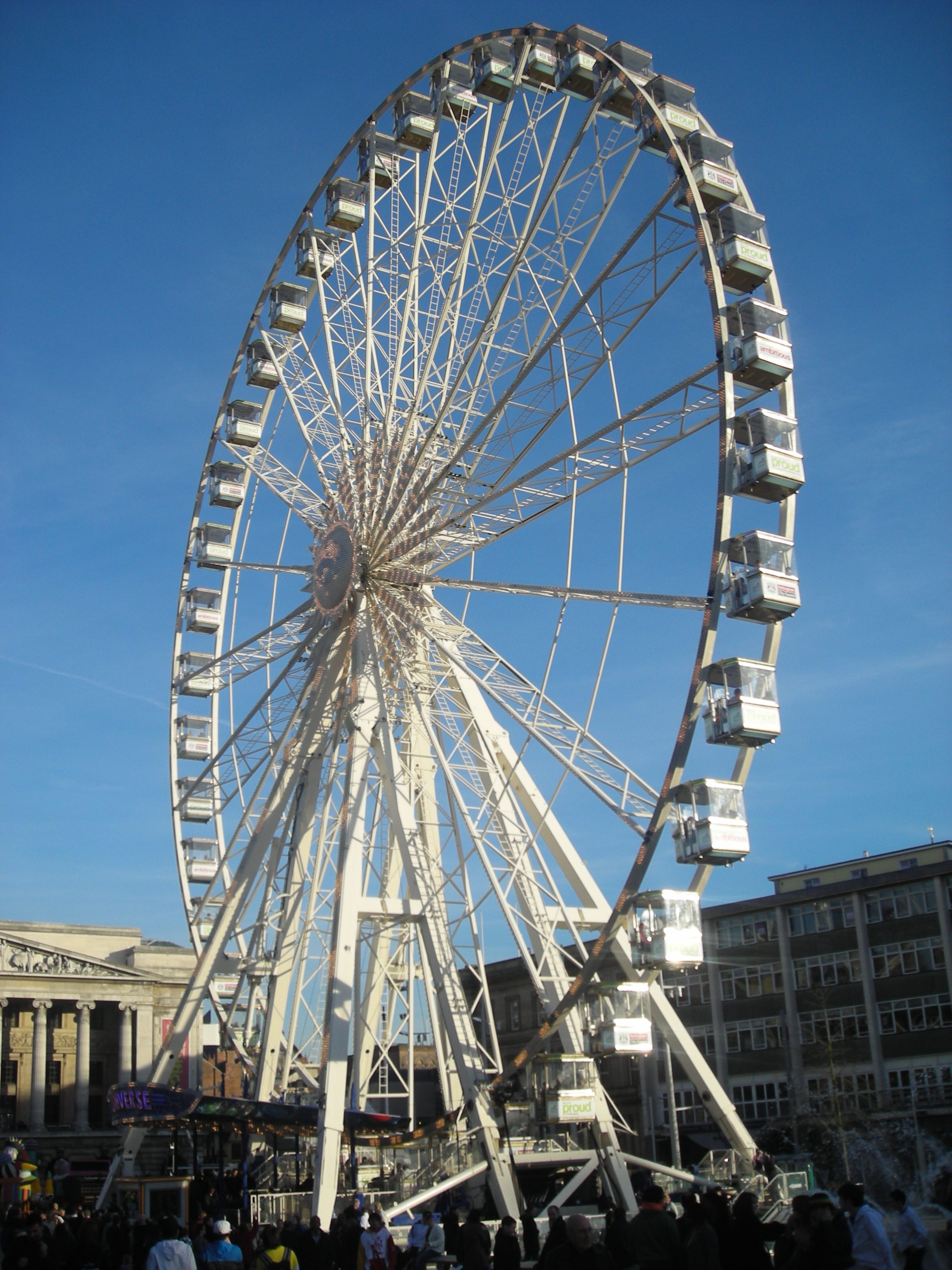
The Wheel of Nottingham in Old Market Square, 2008

In 2004, a memorial service to remember the life of Nottingham Forest's former manager Brian Clough was held there in front of national television cameras and thousands of local football supporters. A statue of Brian Clough is located just off the square at the junction of King Street and Queen Street.

In February 2008, a big wheel was installed in Market Square. The wheel was nicknamed the Nottingham Eye and this name was adopted by the owners, however it was changed to the Wheel of Nottingham after legal pressure from the owners of the London Eye. At 60 metres (200 ft) tall, the wheel provided panoramic views of the city and was the centrepiece of Nottingham City Council's "Light Night".

== Features ==
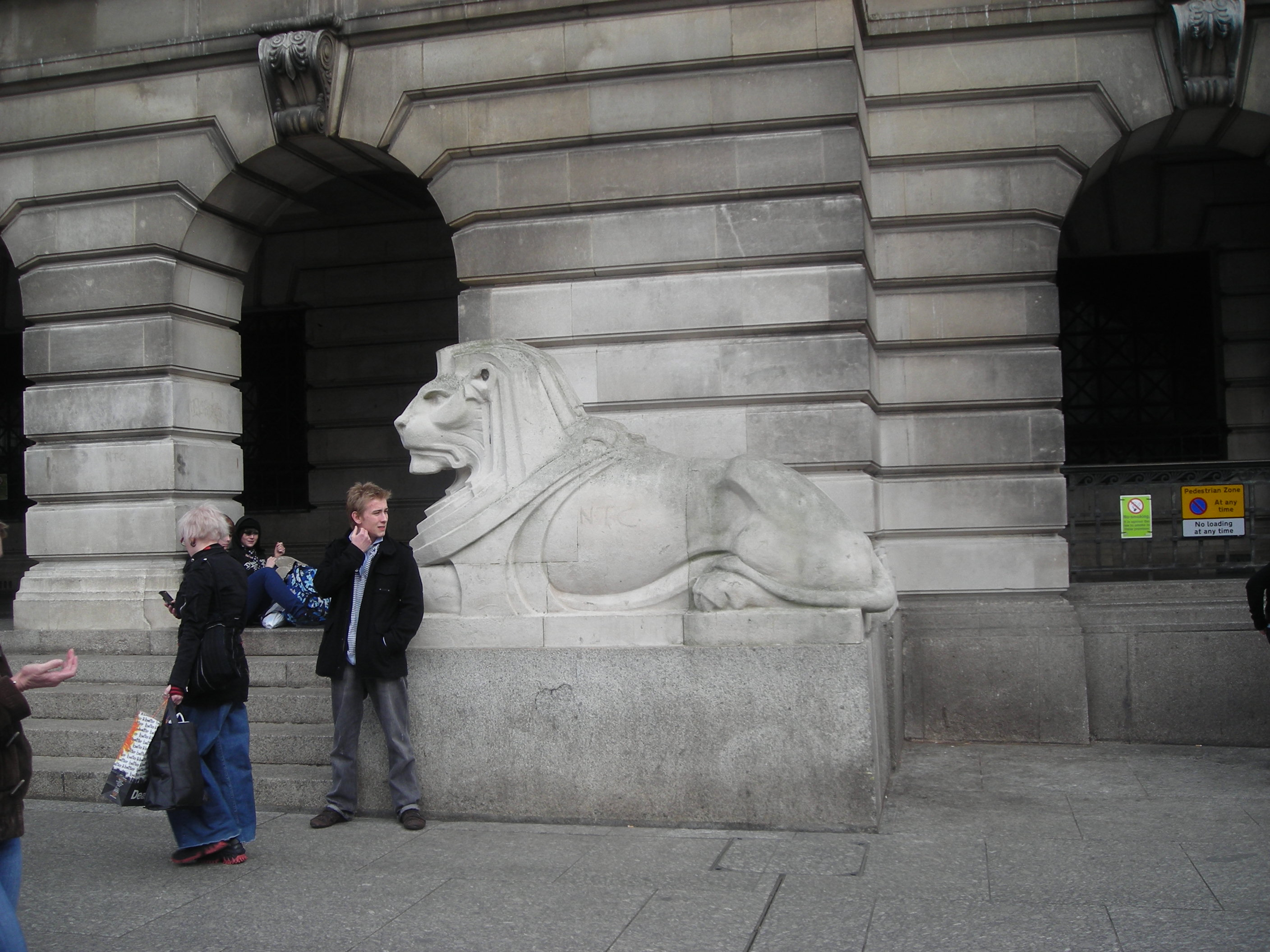
One of the stone lions, a popular meeting place

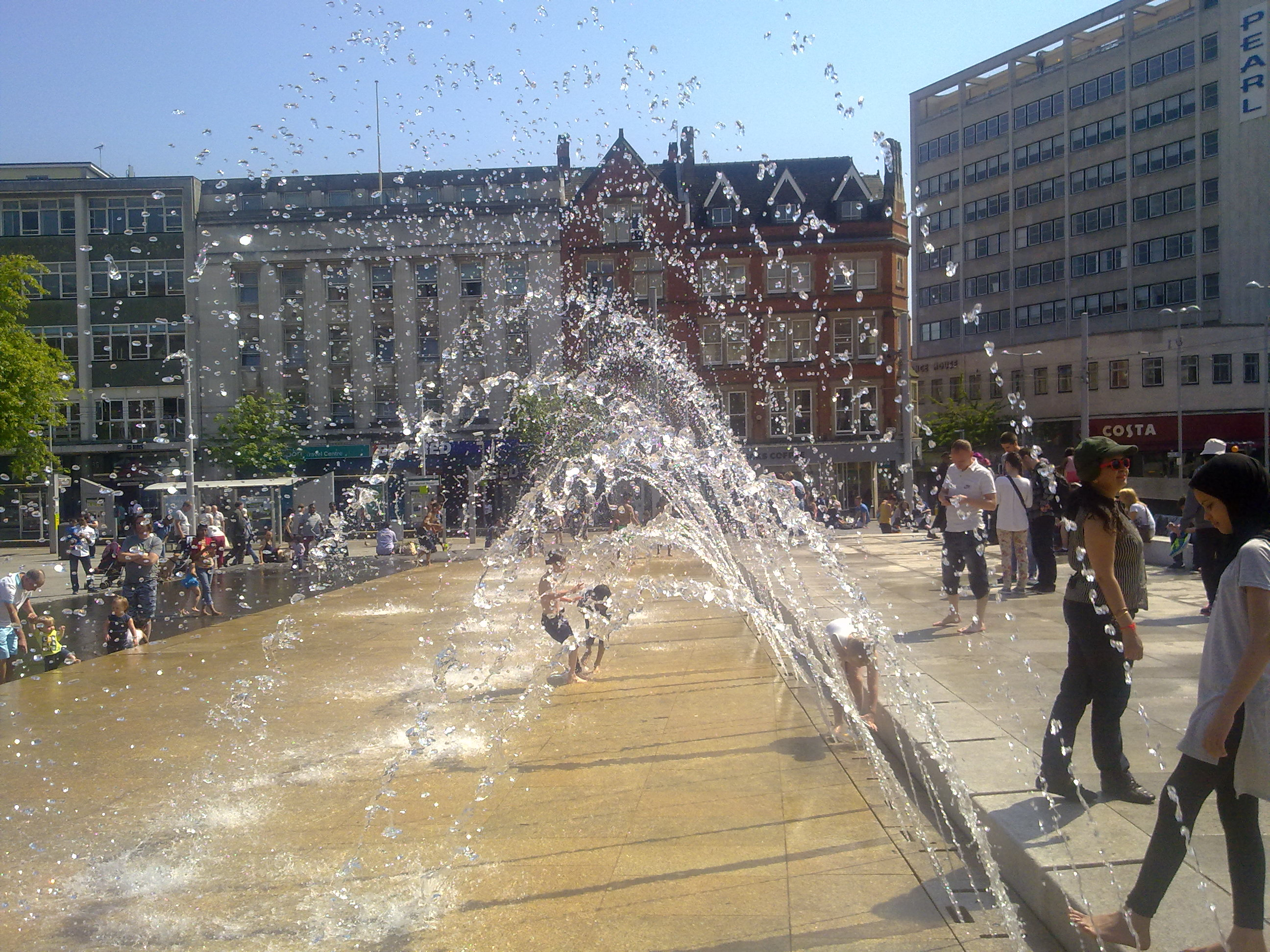
Fountains in the redesigned Old Market Square

=== The Lions ===
Two large stone lions guard the Council House steps, and they have historically been a popular symbol of the city, with the City Council recently adopting the lion on some of its recent 'Nottingham Proud' campaign posters. The 'Left Lion' has long since been adopted by locals as a meeting place. When Joseph Else FRBS, the Principal of the Nottingham School of Art from 1923 to 1939, sculpted the two lions, they were named "Agamemnon and Menelaus", after the two brothers from Greek mythology. Alternative colloquial names are, "Leo and Oscar", and sometimes, "Lennie and Ronnie".

=== Fountains ===
At the time of completion in 1929, there was a square area of grass, either side of the processional way at the east end of the square. At the west end was a similar arrangement, but at the centre of each of these two areas of grass, was a circular pool with a single central fountain. During the 1930s, the water was drained from these pools, and instead, plants and flowers were arranged in its place. A similar circular arrangement of plants and flowers was created in each of the two squares of grass at the east end.

Around 1940, the grass, flowerbeds and earth at the west end were removed, and the two areas utilized as reservoirs to provide a ready supply of water for use by fire-fighters during the war years. These two reservoirs, also known as 'fire ponds', continued to exist until work started on the provision of toilets beneath each of them. Opening in 1947, to the north, the 'Ladies' on Monday the 25 August, and to the south, the 'Gents' on Thursday the 2 October. As the grass and flowerbeds were re-instated at this time, there were once again four grassed areas each with a circular flowerbed, and additional borders, but no fountains.

Subsequently, in the 1960s, the two squares flanking the central processional way at the east end, were rebuilt as two pools with a multiple fountain display in each. These remained until the redesign by Kathryn Gustafson which was completed in 2007, when new fountains and water feature, were added at the west end of the new square.

=== Tram stop ===
On the southern side of the Market Square, along South Parade, is Nottingham Express Transit's Old Market Square tram stop. The two tram lines run in both directions, skirting around the edge of the main square from Market Street in the north west and along South Parade towards Hockley. The Market Square was once at the heart of the city's road network; today it is closed to all traffic except buses along Beast Market Hill and the tram.

=== Speaker's Corner ===
On 22 February 2009, Nottingham's Speaker's Corner was officially opened by Jack Straw (at the time, UK Justice Secretary).It is located on a new extension to the Market Square, which was added at the junction of King Street and Queen Street; with landscaping, planting, and a new memorial to Brian Clough. Due in part to the success of the Nottingham 'Corner', there are new plans for similar projects in Lichfield and Prague.

== Redesign ==
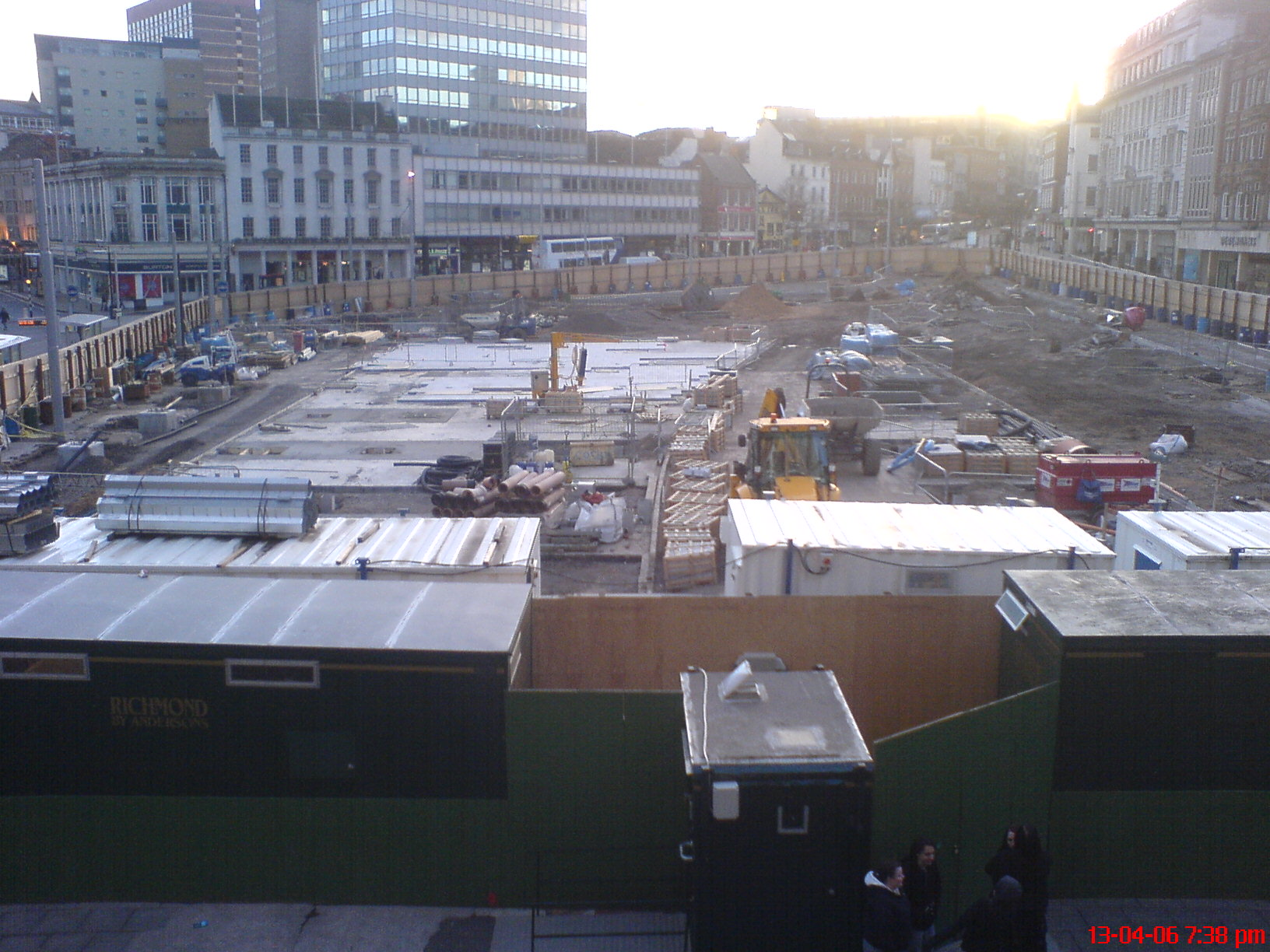
Old Market Square during redesign

A £17 million renovation of the Old Market Square commenced in 2004 and completed in March 2007. Designed by Gustafson Porter, the new square is built from large slabs of granite in different shades of grey. The central open space is a light coloured granite, with white, beige and dark grey granite used for the fountains, terraces and flowerbeds. The final slab prior to the reopening was laid by the Lord Mayor.

The new square is a single tier area, including the re-creation of an ancient border which once divided Nottingham. A new water feature dominates the west side of the square, with jet fountains and waterfalls.

The square was designed to host public events and since the opening in 2007 a variety of successful events have been held including concerts and parades, May Day and St George's Day celebrations, cycling events, and a regular local farmers' market.
