= Timeline of Nottingham =

Historical timeline of Nottingham

Coordinates: 52.95°N 1.14°W

The following is a timeline of the history of the city of Nottingham, England.

== Prior to 17th century ==
Pre-Roman Nottingham was settled after the end of the Paleolithic period. Artifacts and earthworks have been excavated in the City dating from the Neolithic, Bronze Age and Iron Age.

- 410 – After the Roman withdrawal from Britain, the site is covered by the Brythonic Kingdom of Elmet
- 530 – Flooding of the low land extending from the Leen river to the River Trent. The first record dates back to 530 AD.
- 600 – An Anglian tribe, the Snotingas, found the settlements of modern Nottingham (Snotingaham) and Sneinton.
- 867 – The Great Heathen Army winters at the town after being driven from York by the Kingdom of Northumbria.
- 868 – King of Wessex, Aethelred I, and his brother (later to be known as Alfred the Great) arrive at Nottingham with their armies following a request from their brother-in-law Burgred of Mercia. After negotiations the Danes returned North.
- 893 – In "The Life of King Alfred", Asser, a Welsh monk and cleric records the settlement as "Tig Guocabauc" in Old Brythonic. This translates as "cavey dwelling", probably in reference to the innumerable ancient cave houses dug out of the sandstone bedrock which the city stands on. His use of the old Brythonic language suggests that the settlement could likely have been named as such by the Celtic Britons who inhabited the area prior to the Anglo-Saxon invasion.
- 918
  - Edward the Elder retakes Nottingham
  - Market active.
- 920 – Edward the Elder built fortifications on the south bank of the Trent along with a wooden bridge in an attempt to prevent access by the Danes.
- 924 – The town was further fortified on its south side but this did not prevent its recapture by the Danes shortly afterwards.
- 941 – The town was retaken from the Danes by Saxons under Edmund.
- 1013 – The town submitted to Sweyn Forkbeard.
- 1067 – The first wooden motte and bailey Nottingham Castle built by William Peverel on Castle Rock, in the new French borough (to the west of the Saxon borough).
- 1086 – "Snotingeham" is referenced in Domesday Book.
- 1102 – Lenton Priory is founded by William Peverel.
- 1140 – During the Anarchy between King Stephen and the Empress Matilda, Nottingham was captured and burnt by Ralph Paganell. Though he failed to take the castle, hundreds of civilians were slaughtered, many sheltered at St Peter's Church, Nottingham and were massacred.
- 1153 – Fire destroyed much of the city including St. Peter's church.
- 1155 – Nottingham is granted a charter (a document giving the townspeople certain rights).
- 1156
  - Town wall rebuilt.
  - Trent Bridge is rebuilt in stone, replacing the original Norman structure. This Bridge was known as the "Heth Beth" bridge and would act as the link between north and south of the river for the next 700 years.
- 1174 – Nottingham was seized during the barons rebellion against Henry II.
- 1178 – Henry II spent Christmas at Nottingham Castle.
- 1180 – the Forty year rebuild of St. Peter's church began.
- 1189 – Ye Olde Trip to Jerusalem public house is purportedly founded, although this date is disputed.
- 1194 – On returning from the Third Crusade and his imprisonment by Leopold of Austria, Richard the Lionheart recaptures the Castle from supporters of his brother, King John I, after a bloody three day siege. Parliament is held here in the same year.
- 1212 – King John I spends Christmas at Nottingham. He made major upgrades including adding a stone built Keep within the existing Shell Keep. In the same year he ordered 28 Welsh hostages to be hung from the battlements as their fathers had rebelled against him.
- 1224 – Nottingham Greyfriars founded their Franciscan friary on a site that is now occupied by the Broadmarsh Shopping Centre.
- 1232 – St Mary's hospital founded.
- 1240 – Ye Olde Salutation Inn is purportedly founded, although this date is disputed.
- 1252 – Henry III ordered the Outer Bailey of the castle, the defences of which still consisted of a timber palisade, to be rebuilt in stone and the twin-drum gatehouse was probably started at this time.
- 1260 – Construction starts on a new town wall, built with local sandstone. It stood 26 ft high and took 60 years to build. It later fell into disuse and was much demolished by 1540.
- 1264
  - During the Second Barons' War, rebels attacked the Jewish community of Nottingham.
  - The barons who had rebelled against Henry III and taken possession of Nottingham Castle under Simon de Monfort were expelled from it.
- 1271 – Nottingham Whitefriars Carmelite Monastery is established by Reginald de Grey, 1st Baron Grey de Wilton on the site of what is now The Bell Inn, Nottingham.
- 1284
  - Nottingham Goose Fair begins.
  - First mention of a Mayor of Nottingham, created under a charter granted by Edward I.
- 1295 – Nottingham returned two members to parliament (until 1885).
- 1330 – "Young king Edward III and a group of conspirators crept through a secret tunnel into the city's castle and took prisoner Roger de Mortimer, a nobleman who had until then effectively been England's ruler."
- 1336 – A Parliament held at Nottingham, in September, voted to raise money for a war with France through taxes.
- 1346 – David II of Scotland is held prisoner in the caves under the castle.
- 1349 – The Black Death claims the lives of approximately 60% of the population.
- 1365 – Edward III improved the castle with a new tower on the west side of the Middle Bailey and a new prison under the High Tower.
- 1376 – Peter de la Mare, speaker of the House of Commons, was confined in Nottingham Castle for having "taken unwarrantable liberties with the name of Alice Perrers, mistress of the king".
- 1386 – Richard II held a Parliament in Nottingham.
- 1392
  - Plumptre Hospital founded.
  - Richard II held the Lord Mayor of London with Aldermen and Sheriffs in the castle.
- 1394 – Richard II held a Parliament in Nottingham.
- 1397 – Richard II held a Parliament in Nottingham.
- 1403 – Nottingham Castle becomes the main residence of Joan of Navarre, Queen of England.
- 1449 – Nottingham was granted its main charter which allowed the town to run its own affairs, and consequently it gained its first Sheriff of Nottingham. Both market and Town Hall functions were well established at Weekday Cross. Because it stood at the top of steep lanes, of which only Garners Hill remains, the building was called Mont Hall (Mount Hall). This gave the name "Mont Hall Ward" to one of the seven new City Wards at this time controlled by Aldermen.
- 1460 – Edward IV was proclaimed king at Nottingham.
- 1470 – Edward IV visited Nottingham.
- 1474 – St Mary's Church built (approximate date).
- 1476 – Royal Lodges built at the castle.
- 1483 – Ye Flying Horse Inn was established.
- 1485 – Richard III marched from Nottingham to the Battle of Bosworth Field.
- 1487 – Henry VII marched from Nottingham to the Battle of Stoke Field.
- 1511 – Henry VIII orders new tapestries for the castle, in time for his visit in August.
- 1513 – Free grammar school founded.
- 1523 – Henry VIII visited Nottingham.
- 1538 – Lenton Priory was dissolved. The Prior, Nicholas Heath, 8 of his monks and 4 labourers are trialed for treason and executed. They are hung, drawn and quartered and their body parts displayed outside the priory.
- 1539
  - Nottingham Whitefriars Carmelite Friary and Greyfriars, Nottingham Franciscan Friary surrender during the Dissolution of the Monasteries.
  - Bell alehouse active.
- 1570 – Edward Manners, 3rd Earl of Rutland became constable of Nottingham Castle, and steward, keeper, warden, and chief justice of Sherwood Forest; later he was feodary of the duchy of Lancaster for the counties of Nottingham and Derby and lord-lieutenant of Nottinghamshire
- 1588 – Wollaton Hall built.

== 17th–18th centuries ==
- 1623 – The castle was sold to John Manners, 8th Earl of Rutland who plundered building materials from the site.
- 1642 – 22 August: Charles I raises royal standard at Castle Hill, also known as Derry Mount (now Royal Standard Place). The castle is soon after taken by Parliamentarians.
- 1643 – Royalists of Newark attack and fail to capture Nottingham.
- 1644 – Royalists fail second attempt to capture Nottingham Castle but do however occupy the town itself.
- 1646 – Bubonic plague.
- 1650s – Smith's Bank established (approximate date).
- 1651 – Nottingham Castle is destroyed using gunpowder to prevent it from being used as a Royalist fortification.
- 1654 – Establishment of Presbyterian classis in Nottingham by John Whitlock and William Reynolds, formerly of St Mary's, and John Barrett, formerly of St Peter's, Nottingham.
- 1660 – Presbyterian classis shut down on restoration of the monarch.
- 1662 – Ejection of Presbyterian ministers from their livings. Nottingham ministers move to Mansfield and begin to hold meetings
- 1667 – Outbreak of plague.
- 1674 – The Duke of Newcastle bought the site where the castle had been destroyed. A mansion was built on the site.
- 1678 – St Nicholas' Church built.
- 1682 – Borough charter surrendered, and renewed with royal control over officers.
- 1683 – A major flooding event on the north side of the River Trent. The embankment was washed away as well as the northern section of the Heth Beth (Trent) Bridge.
- 1692 – Cancellation of 1682 charter, renewal of 1449 charter.
- 1693 – Nottingham Waterworks Company established.
- 1723 – Bluecoat school built.
- 1726 – Nottingham Exchange built.
- 1732 – Richard Arkwright the inventor was born.
- 1741 – Nottingham Journal newspaper begins publication.
- 1743 – Chapel Bar, the last remaining medieval city gate was demolished for the widening of the road.
- 1752 – Bromley House built.
- 1760 – Theatre built in St. Mary's-gate.
- 1766 – High cheese prices result in severe Food Riots. One person is shot dead by the military. The events become known as the 'Great Cheese Riot'.
- 1767 – The introduction of the 'spinning jenny', enabling a single worker to spin a multitude of threads, causes riots as workers fear for their livelihoods. The prototype and a number of machines are destroyed.
- 1769 – The industrialist Richard Arkwright set up his first spinning mill in Nottingham.
- 1770 – The old County Hall building in High Pavement was built, during the reign of George III.
- 1779 – The rejection of a bill to regulate the framework knitters' trade triggers serious riots. Over five days, workers from town and county damage hosiers' houses and break frames. The promise of negotiations ends the riots, but the hosiers' subsequent refusal to compromise leads to further direct action, only quelled after a large scale mobilisation of troops and special constables.
- 1780
  - Nottinghamshire Gazette newspaper begins publication.
  - During celebrations staged for the king's birthday, armed military officers and locals clash on Market Square, leaving a number of people severely injured.
- 1781 – Nottingham General Hospital founded.
- 1783
  - Trent Navigation Company was established.
  - A drop in the rates of pay causes a riot by framework knitters. Over two days, hosiers' windows are smashed etc. Military repeatedly attack the rioters and although the crowds resist fiercely, they are finally subdued by the soldiers' swords and bullets. At least one person is killed, others severely wounded.
- 1788 – High prices trigger a Food Riot. 'Great quantities' of meat are taken.
- 1790 – J. & H. Bell booksellers in business.
- 1791 – A number of framework knitters from the county assemble and try to negotiate with a hosier. Though unprovoked, soldiers charge into the crowd of workers who fight back, reinforced by numerous town dwellers. A brutal engagement leaves a number of people injured.
- 1792 – High prices for meat trigger a Food Riot. Temporarily dispersed by military, rioters later reassemble, trash the Shambles and use the debris to create a huge bonfire in Market Square.
- 1793 – A number of persons suspected of being supporters of the French Revolution are attacked in a field near the town. The same royalists attack the mayor's home. One is shot dead, others injured.
- 1794 – Over the course of a few weeks, royalists attack suspected radicals and democrats, e.g. laying siege to a cotton mill where republicans sought refuge. Royalists round up their opponents and 'duck' them under pumps on Market Square and in the Leen, torturing and almost drowning many persons. At least one dies following this ordeal.
- 1795
  - There was great flooding as the River Trent broke its banks.
  - A Food Riot caused by high prices of meat is quelled by Yeomanry and Dragoons.
  - Another Food Riot occurs, this time due to the high price of wheat. Rioters go round bakers' shops, setting and enforcing what they deem appropriate prices.
- 1796
  - Nottingham Canal opens.
  - Suspicions that a baker is hoarding grain to raise the price cause yet another Food Riot. It is quelled by Yeomanry and Dragoons. The crowd is fired upon and one person wounded, others are arrested.
  - A heated election escalates into a riot. Following clashes with royalists, supporters of the radical candidate escort him out of town. A fierce fight in Chapel-bar ends as the royalists are routed.

== 19th century ==
- 1800
  - High prices cause a Food Riot in which large amounts of provisions are taken. A number of people are arrested by the military and imprisoned.
  - Over the course of four days, Food Rioters seize highly priced provisions all over town, the military being unable to stop them. Only a heavy storm can put an end to the expropriations.
  - Rioting spreads across UK. In Nottingham army officers are stoned out of a theatre after they try to get the audience to sing "God Save the King".
- 1802
  - A reformist candidate supported by the Foxite Corporation is victorious in elections in the city. There is a triumphant procession accompanied by a band playing Ca Ira and the Marseillaise.
- 1808
  - Nottingham Review newspaper begins publication.
- 1811
  - Luddite movement begins in Nottingham. When Luddite John Westley is killed on 10 November his funeral leads to the Riot Act being read in several places in Nottingham.
- 1812
  - Spencer Perceval, the prime minister, is assassinated in the House of Commons. In Nottingham residents celebrate, parading through the streets.
  - On-going tensions between royalists and radicals escalate into a riot in a theatre as the latter refuse the royalists' command to take off their hats to sing the national anthem.
  - Famine causes two days of Food Riots. They start as a person carries a loaf on a stick over the market. One person is carried aloft by the crowd in a chair, dubbed 'Lady Ludd'. Rioters are joined by militia troops.
- 1815
  - Particular Baptist Chapel built.
  - John Boot, founder of Boots the Chemist is born Radcliffe on Trent.
- 1816
  - Nottingham Subscription Library founded.
  - The funeral of Luddite James Towle takes place in November. Although clerical magistrate Dr Wylde forbade the reading of the burial service, 3,000 people attended.
- 1817
  - 8,000-10,000 framework knitters walk out in a nine-week strike.
  - An ill-fated attempt at armed insurrection, later known as the 'Pentrich rebellion', is swiftly ended and a number of persons executed. The uprising had been egged on and betrayed by a government agent provocateur known as 'Oliver' (who subsequently emigrated).
- 1819 – Hosier workers in the city attempt unsuccessfully to organise a general strike.
- 1821 – A hosier strike across Nottinghamshire, Derbyshire and Leicestershire lasts two months, but again ends unsuccessfully. 5,000 people parade daily with placards "Pity Our Distress… We Ask For Bread" the government responds by dispatching troops to Bromley House as a checkpoint against revolution.
- 1822 – Beecroft's Toys founded.
- 1824 – Artizan's Library established.
- 1825 – Nottingham Mercury newspaper begins publication.
- 1827 – The last public execution by hanging at Gallows Hill (now Church Cemetery, Nottingham).
- 1831
  - On 9 March 1831 city residents sign a petition calling for electoral reform.

Following the defeat of a very moderate parliamentary reform bill in the House of Lords, the 'Reform Riots' erupt as large numbers of people militantly respond to the hated 'boroughmongers' yet again succeeding in defending their privileges. Houses of known Tories, as well as dwellings and shops of their supporters and various law enforcers are attacked all over Nottingham. Crowds target the property of local grandees, such as the 4th Duke of Newcastle. Colwick Hall is trashed, Nottingham Castle and a silk mill in Beeston burned down. An attempt to liberate prisoners from the House of Correction is thwarted by the military. Following the mobilisation of Yeomanry and large numbers of special constables, an attack on Wollaton Hall is also repelled. In the end two people are shot and wounded by the military. Three persons are subsequently hanged on the steps of Shire Hall (known today as the Galleries of Justice). The castle remained an empty shell for 44 years before being acquired by the town and restored.

  - Waterworks open at Trent Bridge.
- 1832 – Outbreak of Cholera in 1832 claims 330 lives in the area.
- 1833 –
  - The first Midland rail station in Nottingham opened.
  - A petition is organised, seeking remission of the sentence of Joseph Turner, transported for life for his role in the Pentrich Revolution sixteen years earlier. The petition is written by Mark Phillips, a member of the reformed 1832 Parliament.
- 1834 – Protests take place in Nottingham against the sentence passed on the Tolpuddle Martyrs. 2,000 trade unionists form up on the Forest and are joined by the Nottingham Female Union. The two groups marched together to Market Square accompanied by a band playing the national anthem and "Praise God from whom all blessings flow".
- 1835
  - Henry Moses Wood becomes sheriff and the first modern police force is formed.
  - Nottingham Municipal Borough was created. It was abolished in 1974.
- 1837
  - Nottingham Mechanics' Institution established.
  - Petition for Meadows development 1837.

The city and corporation petitioned to enclose part of the Meadows for development but this was refused despite having the advantage of having a major railway station on the site.

- 1838
  - The Trent Bridge cricket ground was opened.
  - Female Political Association formed in the city.
- 1839 – 1.3 million-strong Chartist petition presented to the House of Commons in July, 17,000 of the signatories were said to have come from Nottingham.
- 1842
  - Carrington Street bridge built over Nottingham Canal.
  - The Battle of Mapperley Hills. Around 5,000 Chartists assembled on Mapperley Plains, and troops arrested 400 men, leading to a riot.
- 1843 – School of Design established.
- 1844 – Cathedral Church of St. Barnabas designed by Augustus Pugin built.
- 1845
  - St. Mary's Nottingham Inclosure Act 1845 (8 & 9 Vict. c. 7 Pr.) passed, forbidding the renting of caves and cellars to the poor.
  - First residential development in the Meadows.
- 1846 – People's College founded.
- 1847 – Feargus O'Connor elected to Parliament, the only Chartist to become an MP.
- 1848 – New General Post Office building on Albert Street opened.
- Church Cemetery, Nottingham, also known as the Rock Cemetery, is founded on what was believed to be the remains of a Druid Temple.
- 1849 – Boots the Chemist in business.
- 1850 – The Corn Exchange in Thurland Street is opened.
- 1852
  - The Arboretum opens.
  - Richard Young bookseller in business.
  - Nottingham Naturalists' Society founded.
- 1855 – Adams Building opens.
- 1856 – Sacred Harmonic Society established.
- 1859 – Statue of Feargus O'Connor unveiled, 12–15,000 people turn up.
- 1861 – Nottinghamshire and Midland Merchants' and Traders' Association established.
- 1862 – Notts County F.C. are formed becoming the world's first professional football club.
- 1864 – All Saints' Church and Christ Church, Peas Hill built.
- 1865
  - Nottingham Forest Football Club formed. They are to wear the same shade of red worn by the supporters of Giuseppe Garibaldi.
  - Theatre Royal built.
- 1866
  - August: Floral fête held in Nottingham Park.
  - 49 Nottingham women are among the signatures of a suffrage petition.
- 1868
  - Nottingham Free Library opens.
  - New General Post Office built on Victoria Street replacing the Albert Street building.
- 1871
  - Trent Bridge rebuilt.
  - July: Horticultural exhibition held in Nottingham Park.
- 1873 – The Great Depression hits Nottingham, the Nottingham Journal comments: "Prices have risen enormously, incomes have remained stationary, and the result has been that the purchasing power of money is in all probability somewhere about thirty-three per cent less than it was ten years ago. […] there can be no question that the rise of prices is a serious matter to people with fixed or small incomes, and we fear there is small consolation before them in the future." That year also sees a strike in the textile industry: "This dispute developed into the greatest the trade had yet seen and a great deal of bitterness was generated."
- 1874 – Foundation of the Lace Makers' Union.
- 1875 – Nottingham Girls' High School founded.
- 1876 – High Pavement Chapel built.
- 1877
  - Marble Skating Rink opens.
  - John Player tobacconist in business.
- 1878
  - Nottingham Castle Museum opens.
  - Nottingham Evening Post newspaper begins publication.
- 1880 – Nottingham Corporation Water Department and Nottingham Society of Artists established.
- 1881 – University of Nottingham founded.
- 1883 – Nottinghamshire Amateur Photographic Association established.
- 1890 – Raleigh Cycles in business.
- 1891 – Notts County lose the FA Cup Final 3-1 to Blackburn Rovers.
- 1894 – Notts County F.C. win the FA Cup beating Bolton Wanderers 4-1 in the final.
- 1897
  - Thoroton Society of Nottinghamshire established.
  - 7 August – Nottingham is granted city status by Queen Victoria.
- 1900 – Nottingham Victoria railway station opens.

== 20th century ==
- 1901 – Population: 239,743.
- 1909 – In February 1909 Helen Watts, daughter of the vicar of Lenton, was arrested, along with other suffragettes, for marching on Parliament.
- 1910 – Derby Road drill hall opens.
- 1912 – Picture House opens.
- 1913 – Haystack worth £100 destroyed near Nottingham by suffragettes.
- 1916 – WWI Bombings of the Meadows.
- 1922 – Nottingham Playgoers Club founded.
- 1923 – Suffragettes set fire to timber sheds at Great Central Railway Station. In response to Britain's aggressive stance towards Poland, trade unionists in Nottingham, Newcastle and Liverpool attempt to organise.
- 1926
  - Nottingham Natural History Museum opens.
  - Nottingham Philodramatic Society founded.
  - General Strike. The Evening Post is forced to suspend publication, public transport is affected.
- 1928 – D.H. Lawrence writes Lady Chatterley's Lover, but it is not published until 1960.
- 1929 – Nottingham Council House (city hall) built.
- 1932 – Flooding reached the Midlands Railway station 1.5 miles from the River Trent.
- 1933 – Church of St Peter with St James formed.
- 1936
  - Capitol Cinema opens.
  - Royal Ordnance Factory Nottingham in operation.
  - A number of Notts residents travel to fight in the Spanish Civil War.
  - A great Nottingham chess tournament takes place.
- 1937
  - Metropole Cinema opens.
  - Striking miners at Harworth Colliery in Nottinghamshire, who were arrested in April 1937 during disturbances orchestrated by the police are defended by the National Council for Civil Liberties
- 1940
  - New GPO Letter Sorting Office on Huntingdon Street opened.
  - 49 people died when a bomb was dropped on the Co-operative Bakery during the Luftwaffe raids of 1940–41.
- 1941
  - 8–9 May: Nottingham Blitz – Aerial bombing by German forces kill 159, injure hundreds more and leave thousands homeless as well as causing massive destruction of infrastructure in the city.
  - St. John the Baptist church, Leenside (now Canal St.) is bombed and destroyed.
- 1944 – The NUM is founded at a conference held in Nottingham.
- 1945 – Nottingham and District Technical College established.
- 1946 – Nottingham Theatre Club formed.
- 1947 – Flooding of 3000 properties and 86 factories in the city centre.
- 1958
  - Clifton Bridge (Nottingham) opens.
  - Race riot took place, West Indian immigrants in St Anns riot. In the aftermath, an enterprising bus company offered tours of the riot-torn streets.
- 1960 – Lady Chatterley's Lover is finally published, leading to a trial under the Obscene Publications Act 1959.
- 1962
  - Nottingham Civic Society founded.
  - Equal rights campaigner, Eric Irons, makes history when he was appointed Britain's first black magistrate; he sat on the Nottingham bench for 29 years until his retirement in 1991.
- 1963 – Nottingham Playhouse opens.
- 1964 – Nottingham Regional College opens.
- 1969 - Jimmy Sirrel becomes the manager of Notts County F.C.
- 1970 – A group of West Indians, mainly from the island of St Kitts, held a carnival parade in the Meadows." Despite difficulties the event went on to become an annual attraction.
- 1971 – Nottingham Campaign for Homosexual Equality holds its first meeting.
- 1972
  - Lace Market Theatre opens.
  - Victoria Centre (shopping centre) in business.
  - Paul McCartney plays his first post Beatles live concert, with his new band Wings at Nottingham University
- 1973 – Bridlesmith Gate (street) pedestrianised.
- 1974 – Brewhouse Yard Museum founded.
- 1975 – Brian Clough appointed manager of Nottingham Forest F.C.
- 1977 – The Anti-Nazi League is formed in the days following the Battle of Lewisham. Brian Clough is amongst the signatories of the founding statement. The Committee for Homosexual Equality holds its conference in Nottingham. Taking over the Commodore for its meetings and what was then the Albany Hotel on Maid Marian Way for visiting delegates. The conference made headline news mainly because of the invitation of a Dutch professor who had made a study of paedophiles. Gay men may have been branded as paedophiles, but the newspapers did not appreciate them discussing the truth about that stereotyping.
- 1978
  - Nottingham Forest F.C. become champions of the English top flight.
  - Evening Post journalists begin strike action.
- 1979
  - Pedals cyclists' advocacy group formed.
  - Nottingham Forest F.C. win their first UEFA Champions League in Munich.
  - Hyson Green is shaken by rioting between 10 and 17 July.
- 1980
  - Nottingham Greyhound Stadium and Rock City (club) open.
- Nottingham Forest F.C win their second UEFA Champions League in Madrid.
- 1981 Notts County F.C promoted to the First Division under Neil Warnock after an absence of 55 years.
- 1982 – Cycle route (to Clifton) opens.
- 1984 – 1984 Miners' Strike.
- 1985 – Green's Mill & Science Museum established.
- 1989 – Broadway Cinema active.
- 1990
  - Nottingham Transport Heritage Centre active.
  - Nottingham and District Trades Union Council celebrates its centenary.

When the Poll Tax in Nottingham is set, campaigners burst into the council chamber on the 5th March and custard pie several councillors.

- 1991 – Trent Concert Band established.
- 1992 – Nottingham Trent University established.
- 1993
  - Galleries of Justice Museum established.
  - A memorial at County Hall, to the Nottinghamshire volunteers of the British Battalion was unveiled by the Spanish Ambassador to Britain.
- 1994
  - Recycling centres open.
  - 32 fascists from ex-coalfields in Notts/Derby arrested after causing damage and assault in Nottingham's 'Mushroom Books' on 15 January.
- 1998 – When Nottingham Carnival faces the axe, local pressure including demonstrations forces the council to seek outside help.
- 1999
  - Nottingham Pride begins.
  - New College Nottingham established.
- 2000 – National Ice Centre (skating rink) opens.

== 21st century ==
- 2001
  - Sky Mirror sculpture unveiled.
  - The National Front try to hold an "anti-paedophile protest" outside Nottingham Prison and are challenged by around 400 protesters.
- 2004 – First phase of the new Nottingham Express Transit Opens
- 2009 – Centre for Contemporary Art Nottingham opens.
- 2015 – Phase 2 of the new Nottingham Express Transit Opens
- 2023 – Nottingham suffers a fatal attack that resulted in the deaths of 3 people and the injury of 3 others

== See also ==
- History of Nottingham
- Timelines of other cities in East Midlands: Derby, Leicester, Lincoln
