= History of Nottingham =

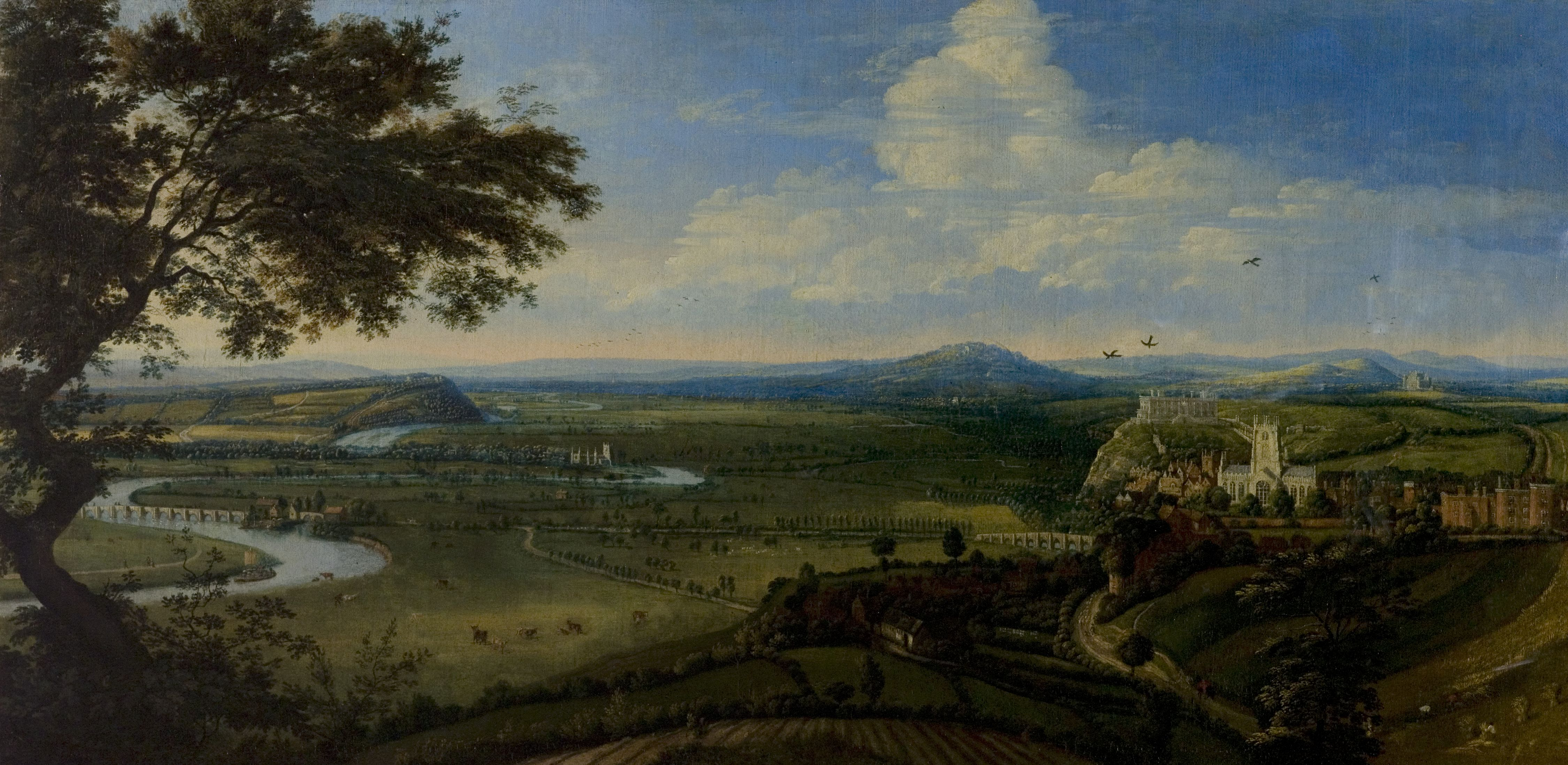
c. 1695 painting of Nottingham by Jan Siberechts

The history of Nottingham, a city in Nottinghamshire, England.

== Pre-history ==
The middle Trent Valley was covered by ice sheets for large parts of the Paleolithic period between 500,000 and 10,000 years ago, and evidence of early human activity is limited to a small number of discarded stone artefacts found in glacial outwash or boulder clays. The post-glacial warming of the climate in the Mesolithic period between 10,000BC and 4,000BC saw the Trent Valley colonised by hunter-gatherers taking advantage of the emerging mixed woodland environment. Flintwork dating from the period has been excavated on the site of Nottingham Castle, and stone tools used by hunter-gatherers have been found in areas of the city including Beeston, Wollaton Park and the site of the Victoria Centre. The Neolithic period between 4,000BC and 2,000BC saw the clearance of woodland and the transition of the area towards a settled agricultural society. Pottery from the period has been found in Attenborough and Holme Pierrepont, and Neolithic stone axes have been found in the city manufactured as far away as Great Langdale in the Lake District and Penmaenmawr in North Wales. Holme Pierrepont is also the site of the area's most impressive Stone Age monument: an early Neolithic burial monument consisting of several intercutting concentric ditches surrounding a central mound containing five shallow pits.

Abundant evidence exists of Bronze Age habitation in the area, including tools and weapons found in the River Trent and other local rivers, a flat axe found in Edwalton and a looped palstave found in Bestwood. A large hoard of Bronze Age metalwork was discovered during building works in Great Freeman Street in 1860, dating from the late 9th or 8th centuries BC and consisting of ten socketed axes, four bronze arrowheads, a palstave, a hollow ring and the base of a spear shaft. A possible Bronze Age dwelling has been discovered in Clifton, including a series of oak stakes spaced about a yard apart in the river bed of the Trent and a collection of mid and late Bronze Age metalwork including spearheads, rapiers, swords, knives and a dirk. Similar though less well preserved sites have been discovered in Attenborough and Holme Pierrepont. Cropmarks indicating the ring ditches of Bronze Age burial sites are densely distributed across the gravel terraces around the Trent in the south of the city. Excavation of these sites have revealed evidence of cremations and traces of Bronze Age pottery, including urns.

The Iron Age between 700BC and AD43 saw a significant increase in the density of settlement in the area, with evidence of a large number of farming settlements encompassing both arable and pastoral agriculture, each probably occupied by a single family group. Iron Age pottery has been found at a wide variety of sites within the city centre, including the north bailey of the Castle, Low Pavement, Fisher Gate, Halifax Place and a shallow ditch between Woolpack Lane and Barker Gate. Excavations of settlements at Gamston provided evidence of small-scale pottery and textile industries and extensive trading links, with salt from Cheshire, pottery from Charnwood Forest and querns from the Pennines. The importance of the Trent as a trade route during the period has been shown by the discovery of three dugout canoes and a spoked wheel dating from the Iron Age in the gravels at Holme Pierrepont. Iron Age ditches have been excavated at Nottingham Castle and at several sites in the Lace Market, suggesting that pre-historic fortifications in these areas are possible.

Nottingham is notable for its lack of evidence of occupation during the Roman era. Although the Fosse Way was one of Britain's major Roman roads and passed within six miles to the south of Nottingham, there is no record of any crossing of the Trent or settlement close to the site of the modern city.

After the Roman departure at around 410 AD, independent Brythonic kingdoms emerged everywhere in Britain. The Nottinghamshire area was briefly covered by the kingdom of Elmet from the late 5th century to the beginning of the 7th century.

== Anglo-Saxon era ==
In Anglo-Saxon times, around 600 AD, the site formed part of the Kingdom of Mercia, where it may have been known as "Tig Guocobauc" (though this is only known from the later 9th-century account of the Welsh cleric Asser, active at the court of Alfred the Great) meaning in Brythonic "a place of cave dwellings", until falling under the rule of an Anglian chieftain named Snot, whereby it was dubbed "Snotingaham" literally, "the homestead of Snot's people" (Inga = the people of; Ham = homestead). Snot brought together his people in an area where the historic Lace Market in the city can now be found.

The first documentary record of Nottingham is as Snotengaham in the Anglo-Saxon Chronicle entry for 868. Names of this form normally represent settlements established in the 6th or 7th century and associated with tribal groupings, indicating that Nottingham was probably formed as the primary settlement of the Snotingas, whose wider territory would have formed a regio or administrative subdivision of the Kingdom of Mercia. Anglo-Saxon pottery from the 7th or 8th century has been found in Fisher Gate within a defensive ditch that can also be seen in Woolpack Lane and Barker Gate, suggesting the first Anglo-Saxon settlement took the form of a small defensive enclosure in this area.

The placename of Nottingham and the large amount of land in Royal ownership at the time of the Domesday Book probably indicate that the settlement was the Snotingas' royal vill or administrative centre during the early Anglo-Saxon period. The remains of a large 8th-century timber hall situated in its own enclosure has been excavated in Halifax Place. This was replaced in the 9th century by an even larger bow-sided timber hall that was at least 100 feet (30 m) long – at least as long as any hall known to have been built in England at this time. This was later replaced by a series of three halls built further to the west, which survived until the 11th century, when they were replaced in turn by a large stone-built aisle hall. These halls all fronted the street now known as High Pavement, the main street of the Anglo-Saxon settlement, and are similar to halls excavated in Northampton known to have been palaces of Mercian Kings.

Nottingham was captured in 867 by Danish Vikings and later became one of the Five Burghs – or fortified towns – of The Danelaw, until recaptured by the Anglo-Saxons under Edward the Elder in 918.

The first Bridge over the River Trent is thought to have been constructed around 920.

== 11th century ==
Nottingham is mentioned in the 1086 Domesday Book as "Snotingeham" and "Snotingham".

In the 11th century, Nottingham Castle was constructed on a sandstone outcrop by the River Trent. The Anglo-Saxon settlement developed into the English Borough of Nottingham and housed a Town Hall and Courts. A settlement also developed around the castle on the hill opposite and was the French borough supporting the Normans in the Castle. Eventually, the space between was built on as the town grew and the Old Market Square became the focus of Nottingham several centuries later.

== 12th century ==
The construction of St Peter's Church, Nottingham started around 1180.

The construction and opening of Ye Olde Trip to Jerusalem, attributed to be Britain's oldest pub, was in 1132.

== 13th century ==
In 1264, during the Second Barons' War, rebels attacked the Jewish community of Nottingham.

In 1276, a group of Carmelite friars established a Friary on what is now Friar Lane with lands that included a guesthouse on the site of what is now The Bell Inn.

== 14th century ==
The Black Death struck Nottingham in 1349, and is thought to have killed approximately 60% of the population.

The construction of St Mary's Church, Nottingham began around 1377.

Foundation of Plumptre Hospital in 1392, Nottingham's longest serving charity.

== 15th century ==
The town became a county corporate in 1449, giving it effective self-government, in the words of the charter, "for eternity". The Castle and Shire Hall were expressly excluded and technically remained as detached Parishes of Nottinghamshire.

== 17th century ==
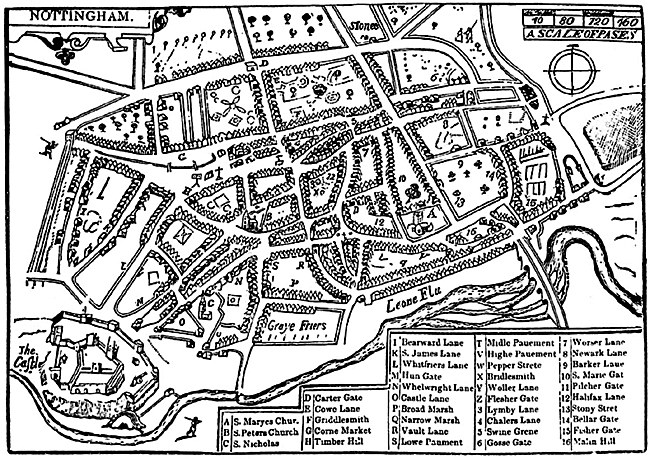
Map of Nottingham in 1610, by John Speed

King Charles I of England raised the Royal Standard in Nottingham on 22 August 1642 at the start of the English Civil War.

One of the first banks in England outside London was established around 1688. Smith's Bank was in Market Square.

== 18th century ==
1707 engraving of Nottingham

The Nottingham Exchange was built in the Market Place between 1724 and 1726 as the main offices of the Nottingham Corporation. It was demolished in 1926.

The hosiery industry became established in the city after 1730, catalysing its development as a major manufacturing centre, with the industry and its offshoot of lace production coming to dominate the economy of Nottingham and the surrounding area during the 18th and 19th centuries.

In October 1766, city residents rioted over rising cheese prices, which resulted in the military being called in to restore order. The Trent Navigation Company was formed in 1783 to improve navigation on the River Trent from Nottingham to Kingston upon Hull. In 1796, the Nottingham Canal opened, and price of coal in Nottingham was halved.

== 19th century ==
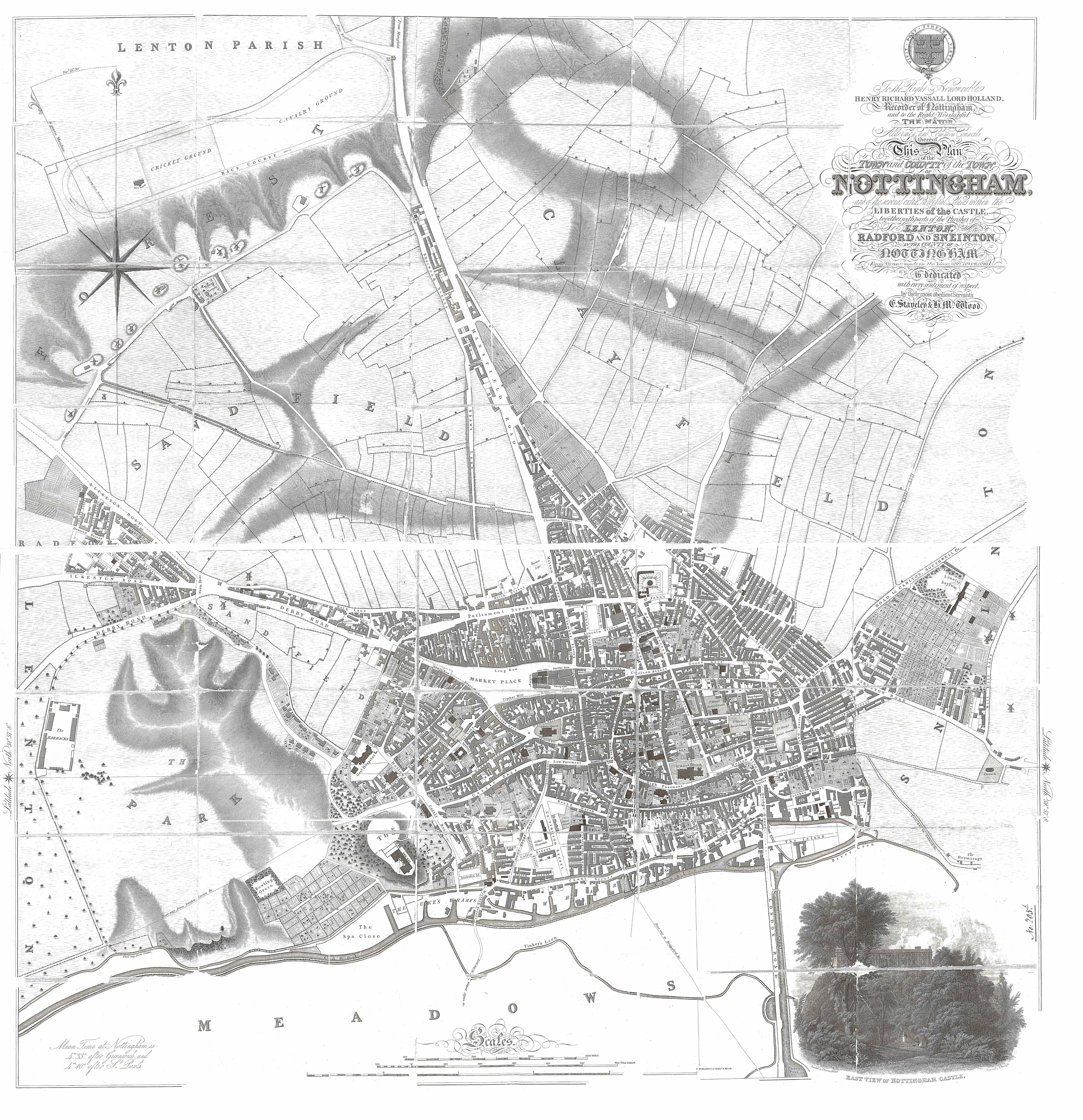
Nottingham and Sneinton, as they stood in 1831

Coal gas was introduced in Nottinghamshire by the Nottingham Gas Light and Coke Company in 1819 when gas lamps were installed, one at the top of Drury Hill, one at the top of Hollowstone, four in Bridlesmith Gate and three in front of the Nottingham Exchange.

Nottingham was the first place in Britain to install high pressure constant supply mains water in 1831. This system was deployed by engineer Thomas Hawksley and the Trent Waterworks Company.

The Midland Counties Railway opened the first railway service between Nottingham and Derby on 4 June 1839.

During the Industrial Revolution, much of Nottingham's prosperity was founded on the textile industry; in particular, Nottingham was an internationally important centre of lace manufacture. However, the rapid and poorly planned growth left Nottingham with the reputation of having the worst slums in England. the Government in 1844 appointed a Commission to look into the state of great towns. Thomas Hawkesley, Borough Water Engineer, testified to the Commission that he considered Nottingham to be the worst town in England. Residents of these slums rioted in 1831, in protest against the Duke of Newcastle's opposition to the Reform Act 1832, setting fire to his residence, Nottingham Castle. Businesses in other sectors founded in 19th-century Nottingham included the Raleigh Bicycle Company and Boots the Chemist.

Nottingham was one of the boroughs reformed by the Municipal Corporations Act 1835, and at that time consisted of the parishes of Nottingham St Mary, Nottingham St Nicholas and Nottingham St Peter. It was expanded in 1877 by adding the parishes of Basford, Brewhouse Yard, Bulwell, Radford, Sneinton, Standard Hill and parts of the parishes of West Bridgford, Carlton, Wilford (North Wilford).

Higher education provision in the city was gradually developed across the century. A Nottingham branch of the Government School of Design was established in 1843 with private and public financial support: it continues to exist today as Nottingham Trent University's School of Art and Design. University College Nottingham (now the University of Nottingham) was established in 1881: unusually for a red brick university, the vast majority of its financing came from local government rates, without philanthropy from local businessmen.

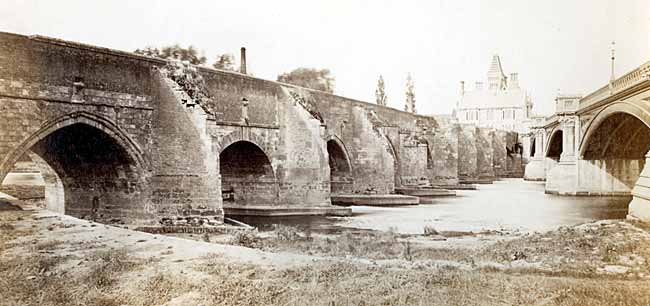
Old Trent Bridge (left) pictured next to the new in 1871

The first incinerators for waste disposal were built in Nottingham by Manlove, Alliott & Co. Ltd. in 1874 to a design patented by Alfred Fryer. They were originally known as Destructors.

The first horse drawn tramcars were operated by the Nottingham and District Tramways Company Limited in 1878.

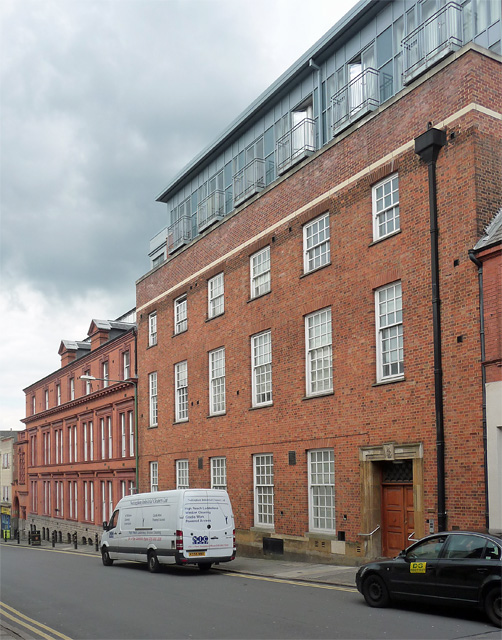
The telephone exchange on George Street which opened in 1899 and was extended in 1938

The National Telephone Company opened the first telephone exchange in Bottle Lane in September 1881 and the first line was opened on 1 November when Messrs Morley's premises in Mary Gate and Manvers Street were connected. By the end of the year there were 22 subscribers. By 1884 there were 350 miles of wires installed to supply 140 subscribers within a 14-mile radius of Nottingham and the average number of calls to the exchange operators was around 1,000 per day. Heanor, Kimberley, Long Eaton, Ilkeston, Colwick, Plumtree and South Normanton were all connected. Later the exchange moved to new premises over an ironmonger shop in Thurland Street before moving again in 1899 to purpose built accommodation in George Street. The first telephone directory was issued in 1885 when there were 170 subscribers.

Public telephone stations were established in 1886 where any member of the public could call a subscriber. The first were opened at the Central Exchange in Thurland Hall, Thurland Street, Swinbourne's Jeweller on Derby Road, Spencer's tobacconist at Mansfield Road, the Basford Exchange on Nottingham Road, Basford and Long Eaton. The general fee was 3d for three minutes except from the centre in Long Eaton where the charge was 6d per three minutes.

Until 1888 it was only possible to make local telephone calls within Nottingham and to other local networks in Long Eaton, Ilkeston and Loughborough but from 5 November 1888 the local Nottingham telephone system was connected to other networks enabling calls to be made to subscribers in Birmingham, Leeds, Manchester, Liverpool and practically the whole of Lancashire and Yorkshire and London and other large centres in the south.

Whilst the local economy continued to be based on textiles during the 19th century, light industry started to develop during its last decades, in particular production of bicycles, tobacco and pharmaceuticals.

In 1889 Nottingham became a county borough under the Local Government Act 1888. City status was awarded as part of the Diamond Jubilee celebrations of Queen Victoria, being signified in a letter from the Prime Minister the Marquess of Salisbury to the Mayor, dated 18 June 1897.

The Great Central Railway opened Nottingham Victoria railway station in 1899.

== 20th century ==
Electric trams operated by Nottingham Corporation Tramways begin on 1 January 1901.

In terms of the city's economy, during the interwar period, lacemaking was eclipsed by hosiery and knitwear production. The light industries which had emerged in the late 19th century to produce consumer goods for the domestic market continued to grow, culminating in the expansion of what became known as the city's "Big Three" employers during the 20th century: pharmacy chain Boots, tobacco firm John Player & Sons and the Raleigh Bicycle Company.

University College Nottingham benefitted from the patronage of Boots owner Jesse Boot, who sold the business in 1920. He donated £20,000 to establish a chair of Chemistry at the college the same year, and the following year he granted his Highfields estate in the west of the city for the construction of what would become the University Park Campus, which was completed in 1928.

Nottingham Council House was rebuilt between 1927 and 1929 to designs by Thomas Cecil Howitt.

=== World War II ===
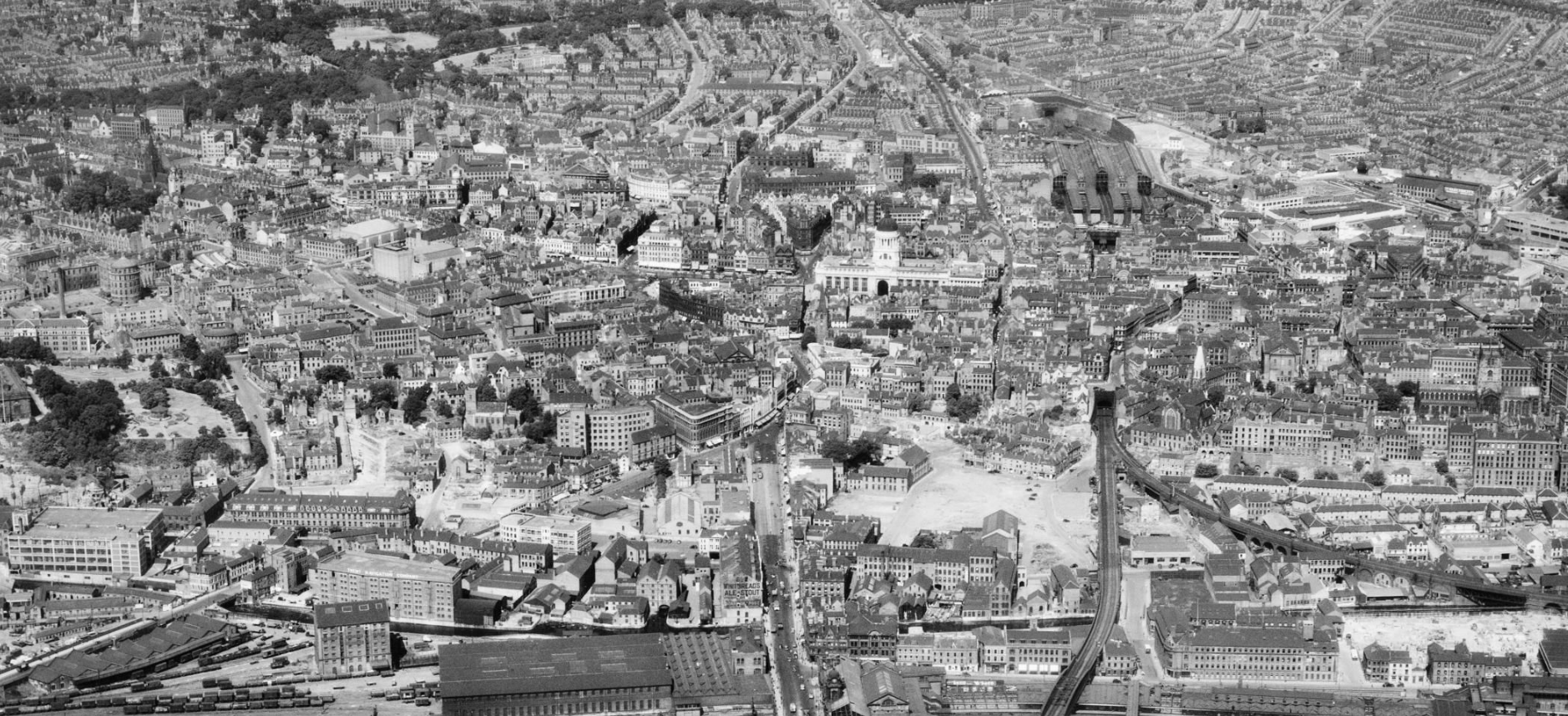
Nottingham in 1947

The Nottingham Blitz was the Nazi German Luftwaffe bombing on the city of Nottingham on the evenings of 8/9 May 1941 as part of a nationwide campaign to disrupt key industrial production, undermine morale and destroy factories, rail networks and infrastructure. During one air raid alone 140 people had been killed and 4,500 houses had been destroyed. Large areas of Nottingham and West Bridgford had been destroyed and University College Nottingham had been damaged.

=== Economic decline ===
In common with the UK textile industry as a whole, Nottingham's textile sector fell into headlong decline in the decades following the World War II, as British manufacturers proved unable to compete on price or volume with output of factories in the Far East and South Asia. Very little textile manufacture now takes place in Nottingham, but the city's heyday in this sector endowed it with some fine industrial buildings in the Lace Market district. Many of these have been restored and put to new uses.

The Big Three initially thrived in the years immediately after the war, with Raleigh's production doubling during the 1950s to a million bicycles annually, John Player outselling rival cigarette brand Wills Navy Cut by the end of the decade, and the profits of Boots' manufacturing operations increasing to 40 percent of turnover, with each of the companies employing almost 10,000 people. However, the fortunes of Raleigh and John Player subsequently declined: the former faced increased competition from both foreign manufacturers and increased car ownership, whilst the latter was hit by declining consumption due to increased public awareness of the health effects of tobacco. Five of John Player's Nottingham factories were shut during the 1980s, resulting in the loss of 3,000 jobs: by the end of the century both companies had moved the bulk of their production elsewhere.

Conversely, Boots continued to thrive: notably Ibuprofen was discovered by researchers employed by the company in Nottingham in the 1960s. However, expansion in the 1970s and 1980s was followed by problems after increasing retail holdings outside of the pharmacy sector shortly before the early 1990s recession and failures in the development of new drugs in the 1990s, leading to the sale of its prescription drug operations to BASF. BASF closed the former Boots prescription research labs in Nottingham in 2001 as part of a deal to sell its wider pharmaceutical holdings to Abbott Laboratories, resulting in the loss of 450 jobs, although the labs were subsequently gifted to Nottingham Trent University - the largest corporate donation to a post-1992 university at the time. The closure coincided with that of the last Raleigh factory in the city and also the closure of ROF Nottingham. The former Boots labs were renamed to BioCity Nottingham, expanded and repurposed as a business incubator for the biosciences. As of 2017 BioCity hosted over 75 firms employing 700 people.

With the decline of manufacturing, the city's economy became more service based. Experian emerged as one of Nottingham's major employers, with origins in the credit checking operations of Great Universal Stores, and joined the FTSE 100 Index in its own right in 2006. However, its workforce of 2,000 is smaller than that of the Big Three companies at their peak.

=== Education and regeneration ===
University College Nottingham became the University of Nottingham in 1948 when it received its own royal charter. Student numbers doubled post-War from 2,000 to 4,000 by 1966, primarily driven by an expansion of pure and applied science provision. The trend was augmented by the establishment of the university's Medical School in 1970 and the development of Queen's Medical Centre, the UK's first purpose-built teaching hospital, which by 2017 employed 12,000 staff. By the late 1980s the university's student body numbered 10,000. The 1990s saw the establishment of the university's Jubilee Campus on the site of a former Raleigh factory.

Meanwhile, Nottingham and District Technical College was established after the War at the former city centre University College campus and took on responsibility for providing part-time and evening courses. It merged with the School of Art and Design to become Trent Polytechnic in 1970, and Nottingham Trent University in 1992.

== 21st century ==
On 13 June 2023, three people are killed in attacks across Nottingham City Centre.

== Robin Hood ==
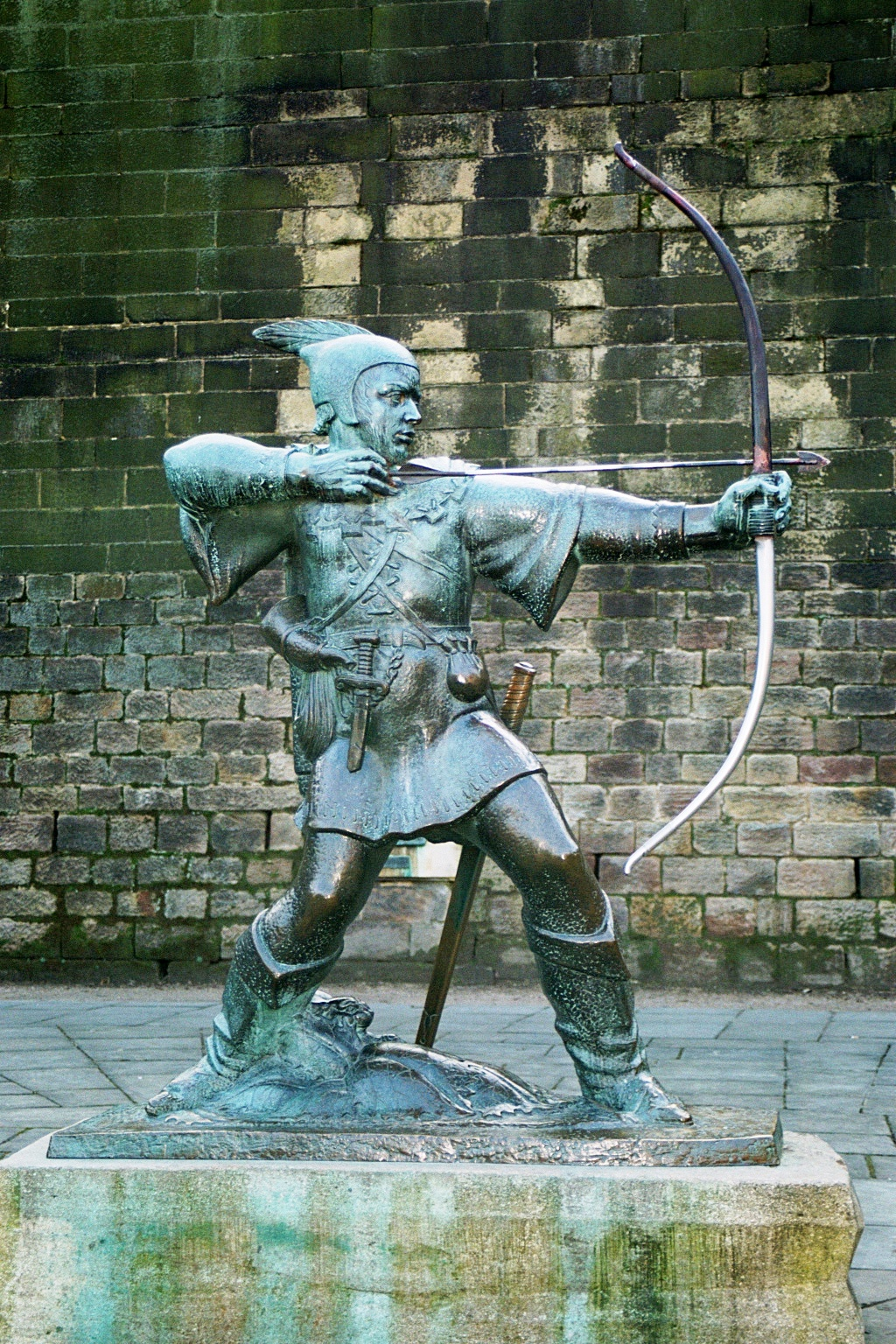
Robin Hood statue in Nottingham

The legend of Robin Hood first arose in the Middle Ages. Robin Hood is said to have lived in Sherwood Forest, which extended from the north of Nottingham to the north side of Doncaster, Yorkshire. Although Robin Hood is generally associated with Nottingham and Nottinghamshire, some authors (e.g. Phillips & Keatman, 1995) argue that he came from Yorkshire. Hood's main adversary was the Sheriff of Nottingham. Today the office of Sheriff of Nottingham is a ceremonial position with no real jurisdiction. Whilst the accuracy of the legend is questionable, particularly the finer points, it has had a major impact on Nottingham, with Robin Hood imagery a popular choice for local businesses and many modern tourist attractions exploiting the legend. The Robin Hood Statue in Nottingham is within walking distance from the Old Market Square.

== Caves of Nottingham ==
The Nottingham Caves have always formed an important part of the region, at first providing shelter and sanctuary, but growing to house thriving tanning works and in modern times becoming a tourist attraction. The caves are artificial, having been carved out of the soft sandstone rock by prospective dwellers, and have grown to become a complex network under the city. The oldest date back to 1250. The city has more manmade caves than anywhere else in the country and this whole cave network has Scheduled Ancient Monument protection equal to that of Stonehenge, making Nottingham Caves a site of vast importance to the heritage of the United Kingdom. Part of the network can be viewed by the public at the City of Caves attraction which is accessed from the upper mall of the Broadmarsh Shopping Centre.

Before the industrial revolution, the cave network was substantially expanded and became home to a large proportion of the poorer populace, particularly those involved in the tanning industry. The majority of the caves were thought to have been used for storage by the 18th century and were still inhabited until around 1924 when the last family (the Shore family) moved out of the caves in Ilkeston road; they came into use again as air raid shelters during World War II. A section of the cave network under the Broadmarsh Shopping Centre is now open as a tourist attraction, and some parts are still used as pub cellars.

Another section of the caves, under the castle, is still in regular use as the indoor rifle range of the Nottingham Rifle Club. In addition, Ye Olde Trip to Jerusalem Inn, a pub that claims to be the oldest in Britain, is partly built into the cave system below the castle and still retains access from the beer cellars to the castle through the cave inside castle rock. Although the pub's building only dates from the 16th or 17th century, the caves themselves may date to the 11th century and could have been the site of the brewhouse for the castle.

== Nottingham Castle ==
Nottingham Castle, founded by William the Conqueror, famed through the Middle Ages as one of the country's finest strongholds, and where Charles I raised the Royal Standard in 1642 no longer exists, and has been replaced by a classical ducal palace. Of the mediæval castle only the (restored) gatehouse, and the ruined remains of some walls/foundations survive.

== See also ==
- Timeline of Nottingham

== Bibliography ==
- Barley, M. W.; Straw, I. F. (1969), "Nottingham" (PDF), in Lobel, M. D. (ed.), Historic Towns. Maps and Plans of Towns and Cities in the British Isles, with Historical Commentaries, from Earliest Times to 1800, vol. 1, London: Lovell Johns, pp. 1–8, ISBN 0-902134-00-0
- Beckett, John; Brand, Ken (1997), Nottingham: an illustrated history, Manchester: Manchester University Press, ISBN 0-7190-5175-4
- Dixon, Philip; Knight, David; Firman, Ron (1997), "The origins of Nottingham", in Beckett, John (ed.), A Centenary History of Nottingham, Chichester: Phillimore & Co., pp. 9–23, ISBN 1-86077-438-5
- Gurnham, Richard (2010), A History of Nottingham, Andover: Phillimore & Co, ISBN 978-1-86077-658-8
- Roffe, David (1997), "The Anglo-Saxon Town and the Norman Conquest", in Beckett, John (ed.), A Centenary History of Nottingham, Chichester: Phillimore & Co., pp. 24–55, ISBN 1-86077-438-5
