= Baston (surname) =

Baston is a surname. Notable people with the surname include:

- Bert Baston (1894–1979), footballer
- Caroline Baston (born 1956), former Archdeacon of the Isle of Wight
- Daniel Baston (born 1973), footballer
- Guillaume-André-Réné Baston (1741–1825), theologian
- John Baston (1708–1739), Baroque composer
- Josquin Baston (c. 1515 – c. 1576), Dutch composer
- Maceo Baston (born 1976), basketballer
- Philip Baston (died c. 1320), cleric
- Robert Baston (fl. 1300), Carmelite friar
- Vin Baston (1919–1963), sportsperson
- Borja González, known as Borja Bastón (born 1992), Spanish footballer
