= Ye Olde Salutation Inn =

Pub in Nottingham, England

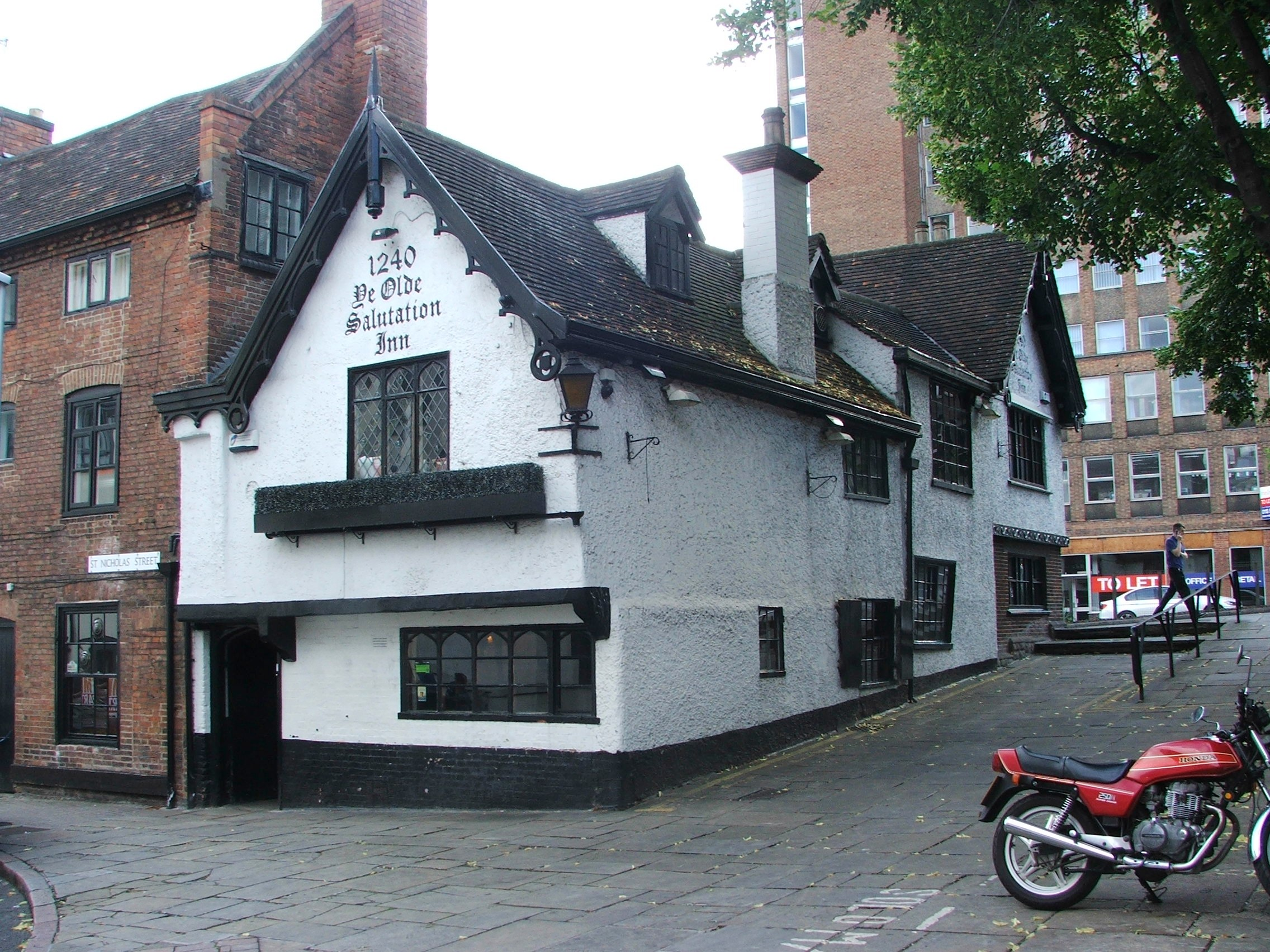
- Ye Olde Salutation Inn

- Location within Nottingham

General information
- Location: Hounds Gate, Nottingham, England
- Coordinates: 52.95177°N 1.15013°W
- Completed: c.1240

Ye Olde Salutation Inn (nicknamed The Sal) is a Grade II listed public house in Nottingham, with parts dating from around 1240. It lays claim (along with Ye Olde Trip to Jerusalem and The Bell Inn) to being the oldest pub in the city. The inn also has a claim to being the most haunted pub in the country, one landlord having asserted the presence of 89 resident apparitions. Aside from these claims, it is best known locally for its rock music and has been described by local historian Dave Mooney as "an old fashioned rock and bike pub."

== History ==
=== Early Medieval period ===
Although much of the city's historic centre is built on man-made caves, those beneath The Salutation are unusually large. They consist of two levels of rock-cut cellars with stone-slab shelves used to keep food cool in the days before domestic refrigeration and a well shaft sunk 24 metres (79 ft) into the rock. Constructed in four stages, they pre-date the construction of the inn. An investigation by the Thoroton Excavation Society in 1937 dated the caves to the 9th century and concluded that they were part of a Saxon farm. The caves are opened to visitors at the discretion of the landlord.

=== High and Late Medieval periods ===
A 13th-century alehouse known as "The Archangel Gabriel Salutes the Virgin Mary" is believed to have been constructed on this site in 1240. The name, which refers to the Hail Mary greeting given by Gabriel to Mary, mother of Jesus, was one commonly given to the guesthouses of religious institutions, leading to speculation that it may have been associated with either the Whitefriars Carmelite monastery or Greyfriars Franciscan friary, which were both nearby, but no documentary evidence has been found to support this. Crusading knights are said to have stopped for food at the alehouse on their way to the Holy Land.

During King Edward III's residence at the nearby Nottingham Castle in 1336 many of his retinue were accommodated in the building, then known as Ye House by ye Sign of Salutation.

The core of the current building, dated to around 1360 by dendrochronology carried out by the University of Nottingham in 1992, was a workshop for the city's tanner with living accommodation above. The building has been described by local historian John Holland Walker as "a typical mediaeval dwelling-house and shop of the better sort."

Borough records indicate the presence on the site of a hostel for travellers and journeymen in 1414 and a private dwelling belonging to a John Alastre in 1440.

During this time the caves provided a hiding place for Jews escaping persecution, a home for a colony of lepers, and servants' accommodation and brewing space for the alehouse and hostel.

=== Tudor and Stuart periods ===
During the English Civil War (1642–1646) both factions established recruiting rooms in the Inn. Local legend claims that leading Parliamentarians, including Oliver Cromwell, signed King Charles I's death warrant in the inn. During the Protectorate the civic leaders, objecting to the religious implications, had the sign taken down and inn renamed The Soldier and Citizen. After the Restoration in 1660, when the inn was given its current name and a sign depicting a pair of shaking hands, a brothel occupied what is now the Dining Room and a sweet shop occupied what is now the Cromwell Room.

=== Georgian period ===
The inn had acquired a sinister reputation by the late 17th century and was a hangout for highwaymen, including Dick Turpin, who local legend claims was almost apprehended in the caves below, and John Nevison, who made the famous ride from Kent to York.

A 20-course banquet was held in the inn in 1788 in celebration of the hundredth anniversary of the Glorious Revolution.

The inn was the site of a tragedy in 1820 when domestic oatmeal was contaminated with arsenic procured to exterminate rats, killing landlord John Green and poisoning the rest of his household.

=== Victorian and Edwardian periods ===
The room now known as the King Charles Snug is said to date from this period.

=== Modern period ===
Extensions to the inn in 1966 included the hanging of a wrought-iron hand outside which was stolen that same night.

The inn was featured along with its rivals Ye Olde Trip to Jerusalem and the Bell Inn in a 1998 episode of the Channel 4 TV series History Hunters which used records, building architecture and timbers, and local legends to decide which was truly the oldest. The programme makers concluded that while The Sal had the oldest building and Ye Olde Trip to Jerusalem had the oldest caves, The Bell Inn was the oldest pub.

== See also ==
- Listed buildings in Nottingham (Bridge ward)
