= Green Man, Putney =

Public house in Putney, London

Coordinates: 51°27′12.37″N 0°13′25.66″W

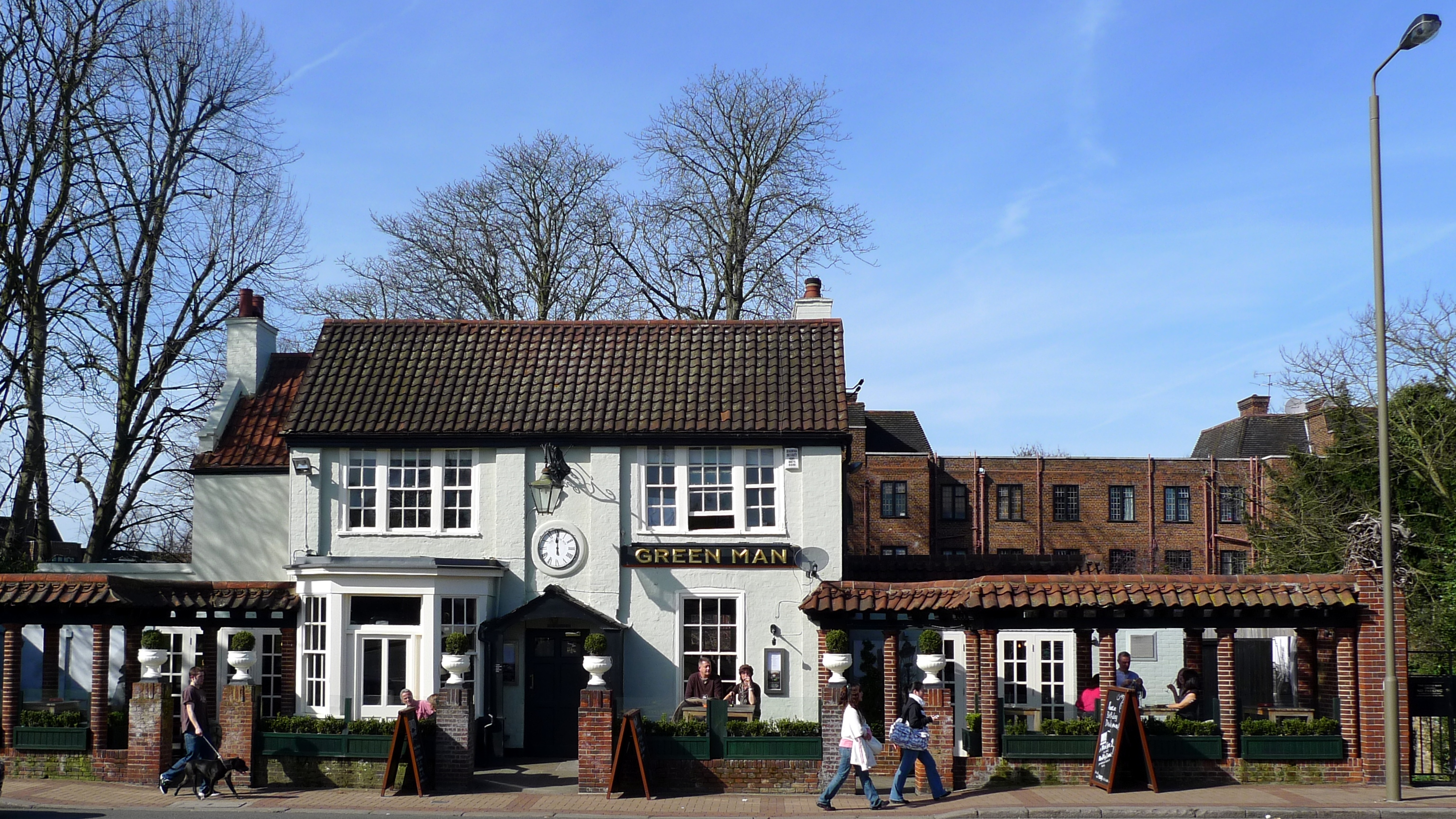
The Green Man, Putney

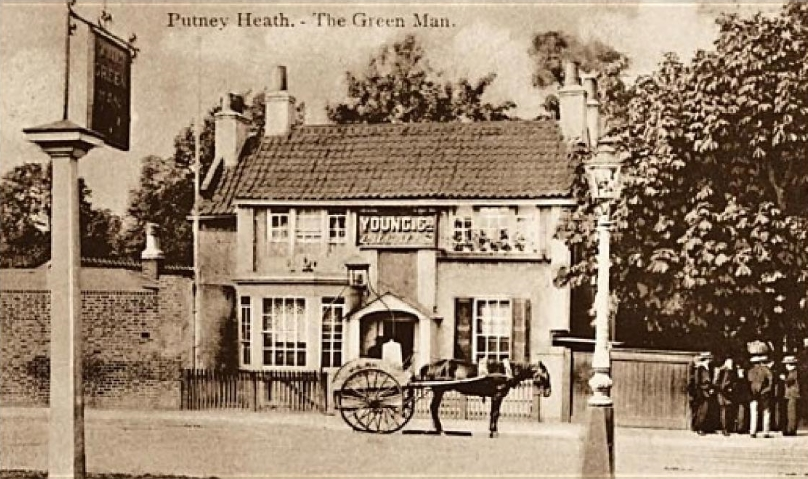
The Green Man, circa 1900

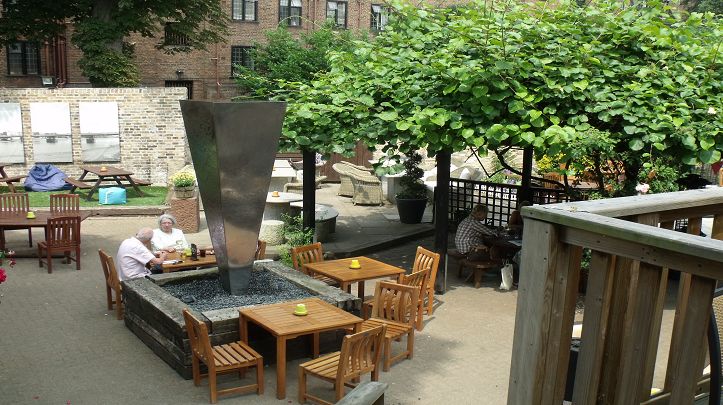
Garden of the Green Man

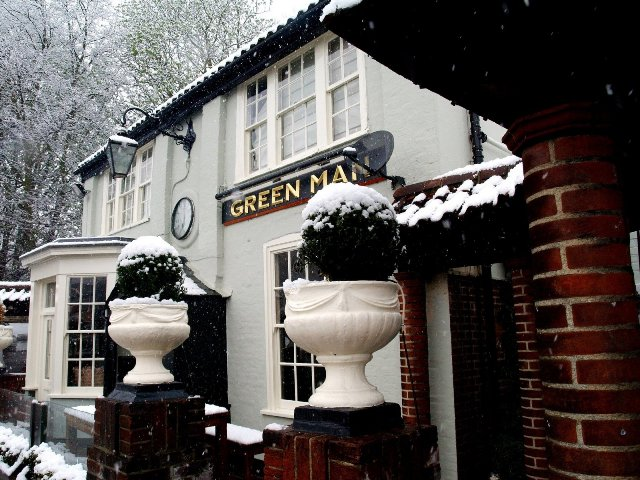
The Green Man in the snow

The Green Man is a public house in Putney in the London Borough of Wandsworth, on the edge of Putney Heath, parts of which date back to around 1700. The pub was once frequented by highwaymen and was a popular place for participants to fortify themselves before or after a duel on nearby Putney Heath.

== Location ==
The pub is on the north side of Wildcroft road, between Putney Hill and Putney Heath roads.

== History ==
A pub has stood on the spot since around 1700. It is located opposite the grade II listed village pound.

Notable regulars have included the poet, playwright, novelist, and critic Algernon Charles Swinburne, who lived at The Pines, Putney, and is said to have always stopped in for a drink en route to the Rose and Crown in Wimbledon.

== Duels ==
The pub is close to what was a location for duels, and according to legend, participants would visit the pub before or afterwards giving rise to the local saying "pistols for two and breakfast for one".

In 1667, the Earl of Shrewsbury was killed by the Duke of Buckingham with a single blow from his sword, leaving him free to pursue Lady Shrewsbury.

In May 1798, the then Prime Minister, William Pitt fought a duel with George Tierney, the MP for Southwark, on Putney Heath. Each fired twice and all the shots missed but the event was the talk of the pub.

In 1809, future Prime Minister, George Canning fought a duel with fellow Cabinet member Lord Castlereagh, and was shot in the thigh, and Castlereagh helped him limp from the scene.

== Highwaymen ==
Putney Heath was also known for the activity of highwaymen. Joseph Witlock and William Brown preyed on the intoxicated as they went home from the Green Man. Both were hanged at Tyburn in 1773. Dick Turpin is said to have hidden his guns in a room upstairs, but this may only be a legend.

Fellow highwayman Jerry Abershawe was based there, and after he was hanged on 3 August 1795 on Kennington Common, his corpse was gibbeted (displayed on a gallows) outside the pub, the last hanged highwayman's body to be so exhibited. Nearby Tibbet's Corner is thought to be a corruption of the word gibbet.

== Present day ==
The pub is managed by Young & Co. The once common pub game, ringing the bull, was still played at the pub in 1998. The pub is inside the Putney Heath Conservation Area.In recent years it has undergone considerable modifications and enlargement of the interior and garden.

== Transport ==
The pub is served by Transport for London buses 14, 37, 39, 85, 170, 493, 639 and 670 which stop at the Putney Heath Green Man stop just outside. East Putney tube station (District line) is a 22-minute walk, and Putney railway station (Southwestern Railway) is a 16-minute walk down Putney Hill.

The Santander Cycles Putney station docking station is a 16-minute walk.
