= Beecroft =

Beecroft may refer to:

- Beecroft, New South Wales, a suburb of Sydney, Australia
  - Beecroft railway station
  - Beecroft Primary School
- Beecroft Peninsula, landform on the south coast of New South Wales, Australia
- Beecroft Art Gallery, Southend-on-sea, Essex, England
- Beecroft's Toys, an online and mail order toy shop

== People with the surname ==
- Adrian Beecroft (born 1947), British venture capitalist and Conservative Party adviser
- Ben Beecroft (born 1998), New Zealand cricketer
- David Beecroft (born 1960), American actor
- Emily Beecroft (born 1999), Australian swimmer
- John Beecroft (1790–1854), British explorer and administrator
- Norma Beecroft (1934–2024), Canadian composer, producer and broadcaster
- Robert Beecroft, American diplomat
- Vanessa Beecroft (born 1969), Italian artist living in New York
