= 1945 All-Ireland Senior Hurling Championship final =

1945 All-Ireland Senior Hurling Final
- Event: 1945 All-Ireland Senior Hurling Championship
Tipperary	Kilkenny
5-6	3-6
- Date: 2 September 1945
- Venue: Croke Park, Dublin
- Referee: Vin Baston (Waterford)
- Attendance: 69,459

The 1945 All-Ireland Senior Hurling Championship Final was the 58th All-Ireland Final and the culmination of the 1945 All-Ireland Senior Hurling Championship, an inter-county hurling tournament for the top teams in Ireland. The match was held at Croke Park, Dublin, on 2 September 1945, between Kilkenny and Tipperary. The Leinster champions lost to their Munster opponents on a score line of 5–6 to 3–6. Tipperary were captained by John Maher.

== Match details ==
1945-09-02
15:15 IST

Tipperary	5-6 – 3-6	Kilkenny

Croke Park, Dublin
Attendance: 69,459
Referee: V. Baston (Waterford)

Tipperary	Kilkenny
