= John Delahunty =

Irish hurler (1922–1997)

Personal information
- Born: 7 October 1919 Thurles; County Tipperary, Ireland
- Died: 9 July 1997 (aged 77) Nenagh, County Tipperary, Ireland
- Occupations: Businessman, politician

Sport
- Sport: Hurling
Club
- Years: Club
- Thurles Sarsfields
Inter-county
- Years: County
- 1944–1945: Tipperary
Inter-county titles
- Munster titles: 1
- All-Irelands: 1
- NHL: 0

John Delahunty (7 October 1919 – 9 July 1997) was an Irish hurler and politician. At club level he played with Thurles Sarsfields, and also lined out at inter-county level with various Tipperary teams.

== Career ==
Ryan first appeared on the inter-county scene with Tipperary during a two-year stint with the minor team in 1936. He later spent two seasons with the senior team and won Munster SHC and All-Ireland SHC medals in 1945.

== Personal life and death ==
Delahunty was a prominent figure in the business life of Thurles. He spent over 40 years as a member of the Urban Council and had several terms as chairman. He died after a period of illness on 9 July 1997, at the age of 77.

== Honours ==
Tipperary

- All-Ireland Senior Hurling Championship: 1945
- Munster Senior Hurling Championship: 1945
