= Flying Horse Walk =

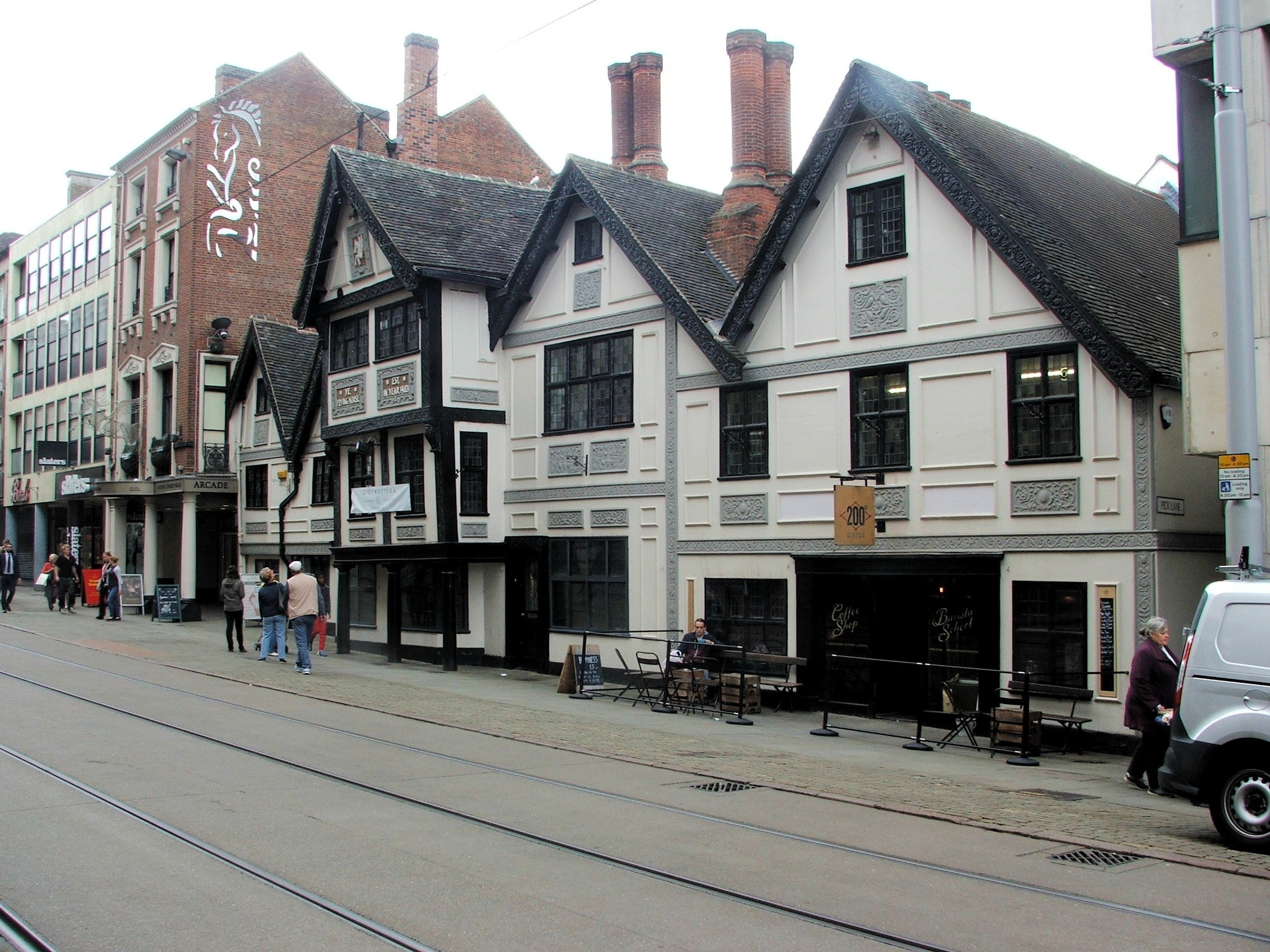
- Flying Horse Inn from which Flying Horse Walk takes its name
- Location: Nottingham City Centre, England
- Coordinates: 52.9529°N 1.1476°W
- Address: The Poultry, 2 Flying Horse Walk
- Opened: 1988; 38 years ago
- Floors: 1
- Parking: None
- Website: flyinghorsewalk.co.uk

The Flying Horse Walk is a shopping arcade located at the heart of Nottingham City Centre in Nottingham, England. The arcade houses a variety of fashion boutiques and other retailers. It is situated just off the city's Old Market Square on The Poultry. The arcade takes its name from a fifteenth-century public house, the Flying Horse Inn, that is located at the Market Square end of the walk. The facade of the public house has been retained and is Grade II listed building. It was extensively restored in 1935 and converted in 1989 as an entrance to the shopping centre.

== History ==
The Flying Horse Walk was acquired by London & County LLP, in September 2011, an acquisition that has seen the shopping centre revert to its previous name, from FH Mall, and acquire new retail tenants. A complete refurbishment, rebrand and the installation of horse sculptures to both entrance façades have complemented the takeover helping to put the shopping arcade, whose entrance sits within an 18th-century four storey brick Georgian elevation, back on the map. The arcade is now home to a range of independent shops selling food, fashion and fine art. London & County LLP plan to convert the two uppermost floors into student accommodation.
