= Poultry, Nottingham =

Row of buildings in Nottingham, England

Poultry
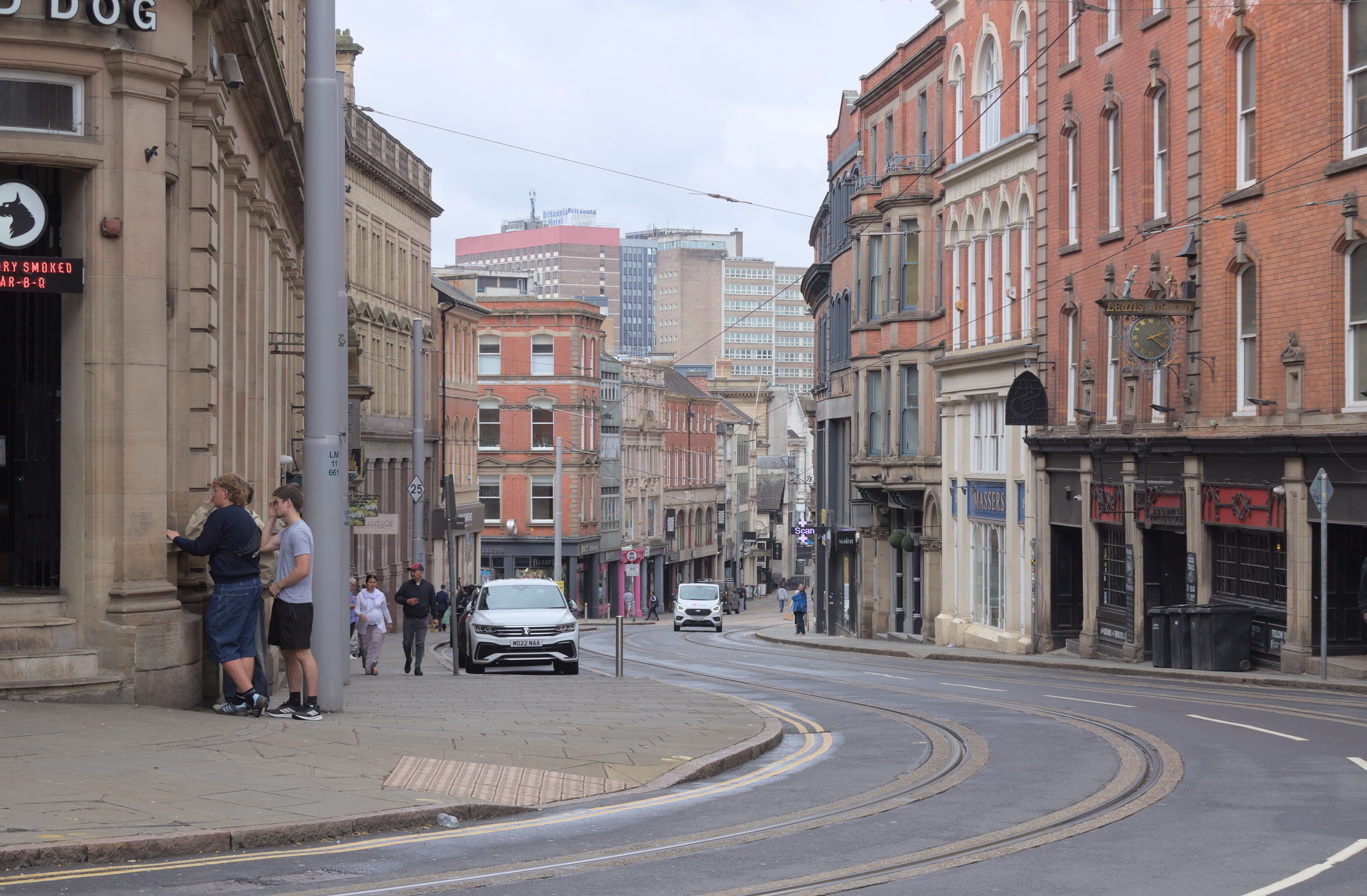
- Victoria Street with Poultry towards the bottom.

- Location within Nottingham
- Maintained by: Nottingham City Council
- Coordinates: 52.9531°N 1.1481°W

Poultry is a row of buildings in Nottingham City Centre between Flying Horse Inn and Victoria Street. It is the name of the south side of the street, the north side being known as Cheapside.

== History ==
In 1396 the south side of the street was called the Women's Market. Also it was referred to as Cuckstool Row; presumably the storage place for the town ducking stool. The name of Poultry emerged about 1800.

=== Hen Cross ===
The Hen Cross stood just within the top of the Poultry, close by the junction of Victoria Street, High Street, Bridlesmith Gate, Cheapside and Poultry. It was the cross of the Poultry Market and is first mentioned in local records in 1416.

== Notable buildings ==
- 1 Flying Horse Walk
- 6 by William Beedham Starr 1931 (formerly The Exchange public house)
- 7-8 Former Beethoven House ca. 1899 (Arthur Wilson, Peck and Company Piano and Organ Warehouse 1899–1939)
- 10-11 by Ernest Richard Eckett Sutton 1905-06 (includes Poultry Arcade)
- 13 (also 4 Bridlesmith Gate) Italian Renaissance in red brick with ashlar dressings and hipped slate roof by Francis Williamson 1875–76. Grade II listed.
