= Greyfriars, Nottingham =

Former English monastery founded 1224–1230

- Location within Nottingham

Monastery information
- Other names: Nottingham Franciscan Friary, Nottingham Grey Friary
- Order: Franciscan
- Established: c. 1224–1230
- Disestablished: 1539

Site
- Location: Nottingham
- Coordinates: 52.949842°N 1.150113°W
- Visible remains: None

Greyfriars Nottingham was a Franciscan friary in Nottinghamshire, England. It was founded c. 1224–1230, and dissolved in 1539 as part of King Henry VIII's Dissolution of the Monasteries. The site of the friary is now occupied by the Broadmarsh Shopping Centre.

== History ==
The friary was founded between 1224 and 1230: the Franciscan order first came to England in 1224, and the friary was known to be in existence by 1230. It was located in the Broadmarsh area of Nottingham. The friary's precinct was bordered by the road "Broadmarsh" (now built upon) to the north, and Canal Street to the south. The site is currently occupied by the Broadmarsh Shopping Centre.

The friary's first buildings were built of wood, with King Henry III (1216–1272) making a series of donations of lumber towards the construction. In 1230 Henry donated 20 tiebeams towards the construction of the friary's church. In 1232 and 1234 he donated trees from Sherwood Forest to create the church's stalls. In 1247 he donated a total of 11 oaks for the construction of their infirmary and monastic buildings, and in 1261 he donated wood for the dormitory and chapter-house. Between 1326 and 1327, the King also made donations of timber to enable the friars to construct a quay on the river. It is not clear whether this quay was on the River Leen (which originally flowed near to the friary), or on the River Trent.

The friary church was quickly rebuilt in stone, with King Henry III also making donations towards the work. In 1256 he gave permission for the monks to use stone from his quarry in Nottingham for the work. The new stone church was not completed until 1303, when it (and the surrounding churchyard) were consecrated. The church's aisles or side-chapels were completed later, as they were not consecrated until 1310.

The friary dissolved in 1539 as part of King Henry VIII's Dissolution of the Monasteries. It was surrendered on the same day as Nottingham's other friary, Nottingham Whitefriars: 5 February 1539. The friary was surrendered by the Warden (a similar post to a Prior), Thomas Basford, and seven other friars: Robert Alyne, Francis Bryce, John Chester, Robert Hampton, Robert Morton, Thomas Ryppon and Roger Stanley.

In 1548 the former friary site was given to Thomas Heneage.

== Remains ==
Nothing remains of the friary as the entire site has been occupied by the Broadmarsh Shopping centre that was built in the 1970s.

Excavations in 1937 located the friary's southern boundary wall, and the friary was previously remembered in the local road name "Grey Friars Gate", however both are now lost due to the construction of the shopping centre.

A cast of the friary's 15th-century seal is kept at the British Museum.
