= Ringing the bull =

Pub game

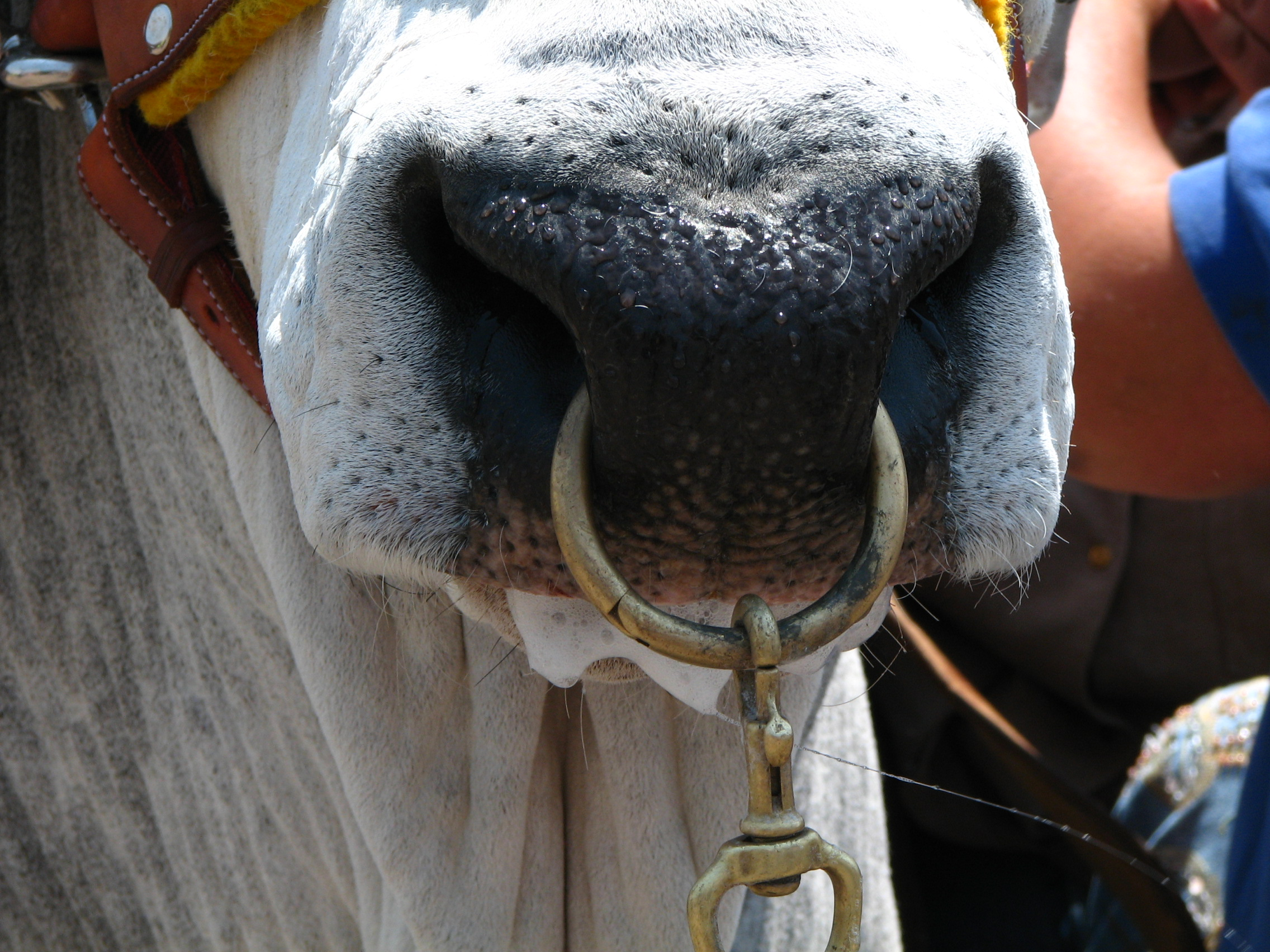
Nose ring on a bull

Ring a bull is a pub game. A bull's nose-ring on a length of string is swung in an arc with the aim of hooking onto a bull's horn or hook attached to the wall. The ring must stay on the hook to count as a successful throw.

There is a tradition of playing this game at what is reputedly the oldest pub in England, Ye Olde Trip To Jerusalem in Nottingham, and in several other traditional public houses.

== Caribbean variant ==
The hook and ring game was adopted by the earlier settlers of the Caribbean islands, where it is also referred to as the Bimini Ring Game. When the hook is attached to a post or pole, the ring can actually be swung behind the hook, catching on the hook as it swings back. If the ring is caught by the hook, the score is two points. If the ring is first swung from behind the hook and it swings back and catches on the hook, the score for the throw is three points.

== In popular culture ==
During episode 49 of Schlag den Raab on the 15 and 16 November 2014 Ringing the bull was played as the 15th game of the evening. It was terminated after about an hour when both participants failed to score a single point.

In episode four of season one of Extant Molly's father Quinn (Louis Gossett Jr.) uses her android son (Pierce Gagnon) for gambling purposes by getting him to play Ringing the bull in a bar.
