= Flying Horse Inn =

Building in Nottingham, England

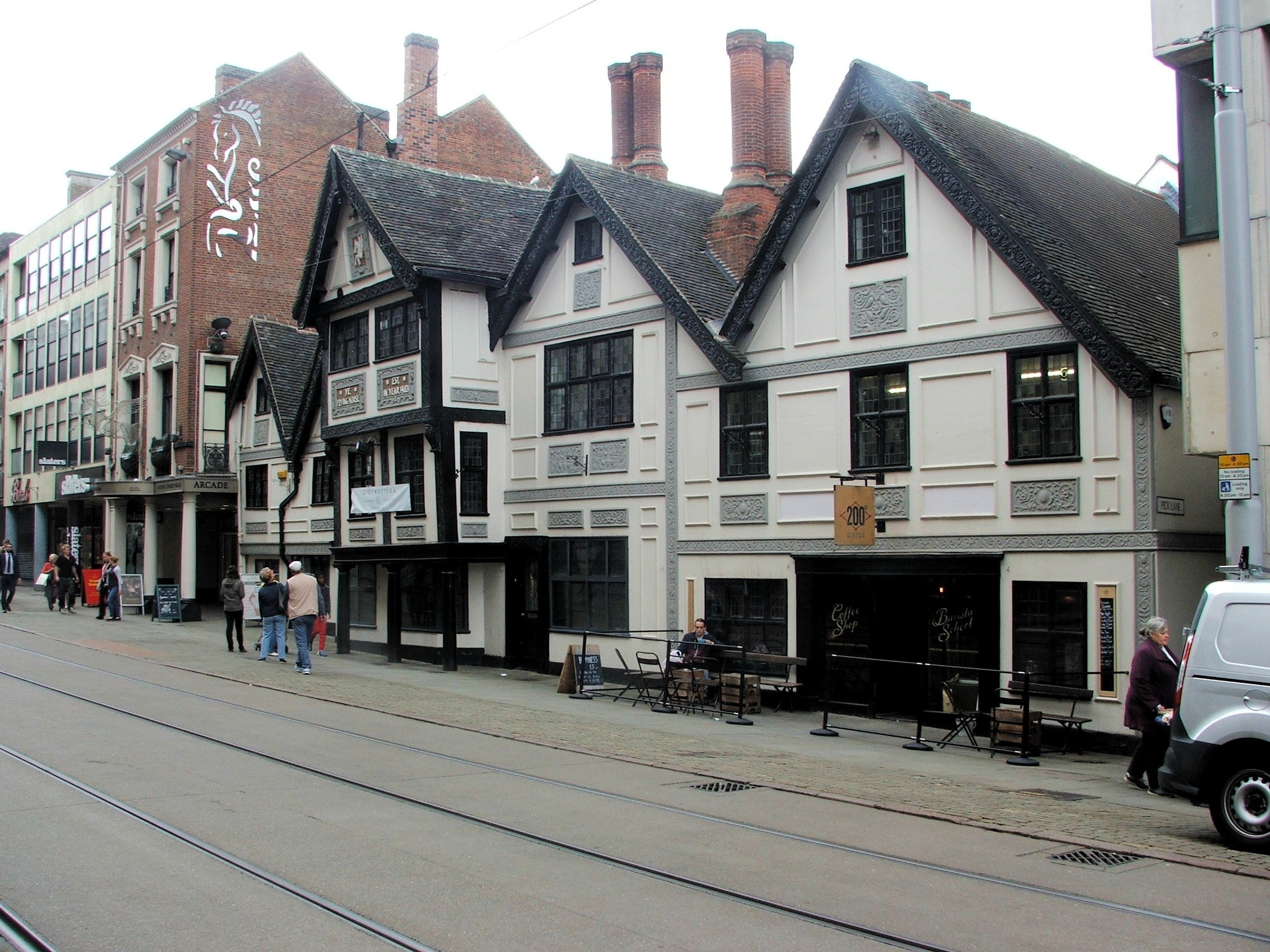

- Location within Nottinghamshire

General information
- Location: The Poultry, Nottingham, England
- Coordinates: 52.95313°N 1.14869°W
- Completed: 1483; 543 years ago

The Flying Horse Inn is a former public house in Nottingham. It was established around 1483. It is a Grade II listed building.

It stands upon the site of the house which the Plumptre family erected for themselves when they first came to Nottingham in the 13th century.

The first information of "The Flying Horse," is from 1400 when John de Plumtre founded Plumptre Hospital. The property forming the endowment included the oldest portion of The Flying Horse in The Poultry.

In the 18th century it was called the "Travellers Inn". in 1791 at the Flying Horse Inn.

In 1799 "The Flying Horse" was in the possession of one William Rowbotham. The house was described as being at the Hen Cross.

In 1813, a great dinner was held to celebrate victory over Napoleon I. A figure of Napoleon had been brought from London by coach, and this was burned in the Market Place amidst scenes of excitement and rejoicing.

By 1818, the owner was Robert Mackley. In 1826 the rent was £63 a year. The building was in bad condition and scarcely habitable. After repair the rent increased to £100 a year. In 1832 Jane Clark occupied The Inn.

It was heavily restored in 1935.

On Thursday 24 November 1977 Richard Branson, with John Mortimer, Johnny Rotten and entourage, visited the pub to celebrate Virgin Records being found not guilty at Nottingham Magistrates Court of charges relating to the promotion of The Sex Pistols' Never Mind the Bollocks album. A promo poster for the album had been displayed in the Virgin Record Store at 7 Kings Street, Nottingham, when complaints over the word 'bollocks' led the police to visit the shop on 9 November. After failing to comply with a request to remove the poster, the shop manager, Chris Serle, had been summoned to appear. Mortimer had been instructed to represent Virgin Records.

It survived as a public house until 1989, when it was converted into a shop. It is now at the entrance to the Flying Horse Walk shopping mall.
