= Philip Baston =

Philip Baston or Boston (died 1320?), was an English Carmelite.

Baston was the brother of the poet Robert Baston. He was born near Nottingham, in which town he became a Carmelite friar. From Nottingham Philip Baston proceeded to Oxford, where, according to Pits, after long application to philosophical and theological studies, he finally devoted himself to rhetoric and poetry, in both of which pursuits he gained great fame. At the same time he did not altogether neglect work of a more popular nature, but used very frequently to hold forth to the people.

Tanner quotes from the register of Oliver Sutton, bishop of Lincoln from 1280 to 1300, an entry to the effect that a certain friar Phil. de Baston, of the Carmelite order, was ordained priest on 22 September 1296. He was confessor to Edward II by June 1318, a post he still held in 1327.

Philip Baston died after 1327, and was buried in the Carmelite house in Nottingham. His biographers ascribe two works to his pen, the one being entitled Doctæ Conciones, and the other a collection of letters.
