= The Bell Inn, Nottingham =

Pub in Nottingham, England

The Bell Inn
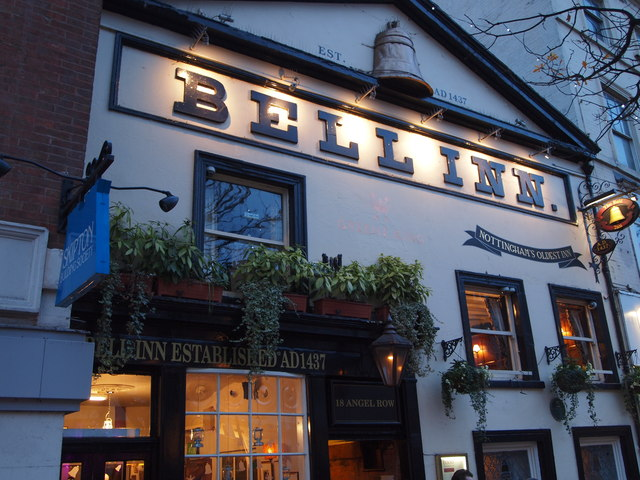

- Location within Nottingham

General information
- Architectural style: Tudor/Georgian
- Location: 18 Angel Row, Old Market Square, Nottingham, England
- Coordinates: 52°57′12″N 1°09′07″W
- Completed: c.1437

Design and construction
- Designations: Grade II listed

The Bell Inn is a pub in Nottingham, England. Completed from around 1437, it claims, along with Ye Olde Trip to Jerusalem and Ye Olde Salutation Inn, to be the oldest pub in the city. In 1982 the pub became a Grade II listed building.

== History ==
=== Foundation and early history ===
Sometime before 1271 Nottingham Whitefriars established a friary on what is now Friar Lane with lands that included a guesthouse on the site of what is now the Bell Inn. The building was constructed as a refectory for the monks of the monastery on Beastmarket Hill; according to dendrochronological dating of timbers, it was built around 1420. It became a secular alehouse in 1539, following the Dissolution of the Monasteries by Henry VIII, taking its name from the Angelus bell that hung outside.

The earliest known written reference to the property dates from 1638, when on the death of Robert Sherwin, a former Lord Mayor and Sheriff of Nottingham, his rights to half the rental income of the Inn were bequeathed to several churches for them to distribute to the poor of Nottingham.

John White bequeathed the freehold of the Inn to his wife Mary in 1732 and two years later she sold it to a wealthy local banker, Abel Smith. The freehold subsequently passed down the Smith family line to the politician and banker Abel Smith, in 1756, and then to Robert Smith, 1st Baron Carrington, in 1782.

=== The 19th century ===
Jane Lart purchased the freehold from Lord Carrington in 1803 and the leasehold from the Church in 1806 combining the two legally. Under the terms of the lease she also undertook extensive repairs of the building and constructed a Georgian frontage that allowed for the preservation of the rare crown post structure to this day.

The cricketer William Clarke gave up his bricklaying job to become landlord of the Inn in 1812 before going on to marry the landlady of the Trent Bridge Inn, where he established the famous Trent Bridge cricket ground.

Rioters protesting against the Reform Act gathered at the Inn on Goose Fair night 1831 and smashed the windows before going on to burn down many of the city's prominent buildings, including Nottingham Castle and Colwick Hall.

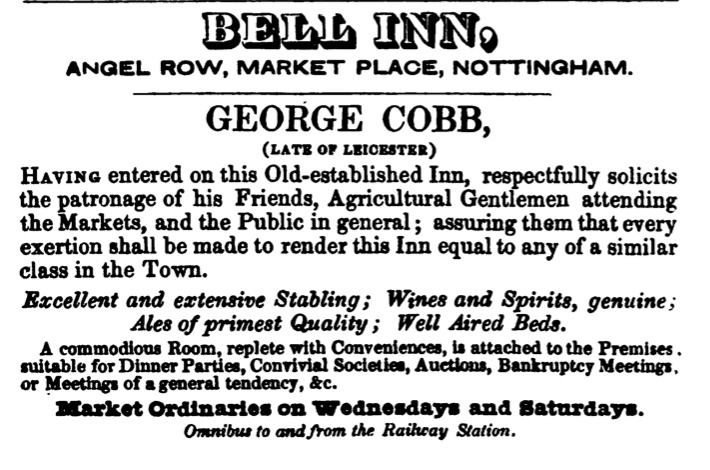
Advert from 1840

Tory politician John Walters established his campaign headquarters at the Inn for the 1841 British general election and had to take refuge here when he was set upon by an angry mob in the Square.

The Charity Commission sold the Inn in 1888 to A.W. Hickling for £7,210 (equivalent to £810,240 in 2025), and it subsequently became a tied house to a brewery for the first time in its history.

Joseph Jackson bought the Inn on 21 October 1898 for £12,500 (equivalent to £1,404,720 in 2025).

=== The 20th century ===
Mary Jackson succeeded her husband as proprietor in 1913 and established the famous two-course Market Dinners of Stilton cheese, beef and vegetables, and a pint of Nottingham ale, for one shilling. Following her death a quirk in her will meant the Inn had to go for sale by public auction.

The Inn was purchased for £26,000 (equivalent to £1,412,210 in 2025) by her youngest son Robert, who in 1928 converted the stable courtyard at the rear of the premises into the café-bar-style Snack Bar, which included a large cabinet radio gramophone and catered to the workers building the new Nottingham Council House nearby.

Robert's widow Dorothy continued the business following his death in 1934 and was joined by their son David in 1953. Extensive renovations opened up the family's first-floor accommodation to public use as the clubroom (now The Belfry Restaurant).

In 1957 the Jacksons established the Presentation of the President's Tankard ceremony, which takes place on the first Wednesday in November and sees the President of the University of Nottingham Students' Union receive an engraved silver tankard and a public banquet of two roasted pigs with stuffing, bread, and apple sauce. A plaque engraved with a list of all the Presidents since is on display in the Snack Bar.

In 1982 the Inn became a Grade II listed building.

Dorothy died in 1984 and David continued running the business with his two sons Paul and Richard. Another period of renovation concluded with the extension of the Snack Bar in 1991.

The Jackson family celebrated 100 years of ownership in 1998 and the Inn was featured, along with its rivals Ye Olde Trip to Jerusalem Inn and Ye Olde Salutation Inn, in an episode of the Channel 4 TV series History Hunters, which used records, building architecture and timbers, and local legends to decide which was truly the oldest.

=== The 21st century ===
The Inn was sold to Hardys & Hansons in 2002, which was in turn sold to Greene King in 2006.

== Premises ==
=== Entranceway and bars ===
Entrance to the bars is via the central passageway, which used to lead to the stables where the Snack Bar now stands and retains its original flagstones.

The original bars known as The Long Room (a.k.a. The Tudor Bar) and The Elizabethan Bar (a.k.a. Lizzie's Bar) date back to 1437 and the original timber crown-posts and cross beams have been preserved. The Tudor Bar also features a piece of the original wallpaper amongst other historical artifacts on display. Lizzie's Bar is dominated by a large stained-glass window; restoration work in 2002 uncovered the original wooden floor showing evidence of where the bar was once located.

=== First floor restaurant and function room ===
The original living quarters, with a bedroom and bathroom featuring two front-facing windows overlooking the Old Market Square, were opened to the public as the Clubroom by the Jackson family in 1953. The oak-panelled low-beamed room, which features an original fireplace, now houses The Belfry restaurant. The Crown Post Room is an extension to The Belfry used for private functions and features the unusual crown post roof supports.

=== The cellars ===
The cellars are located in natural and hand-carved caves in the sandstone beneath what is now the Snack Bar and adjacent buildings. Dating back to the Norman dynasty, they were excavated by the Carmelite friars and contain two wells (including the Monks Well), the site of the original kitchen where Mary Jackson prepared her Market Dinners and a well-preserved bonded warehouse once used by a neighbouring wine merchant.

== Television ==
In 1998, Channel 4 television series History Hunters examined the claims of The Bell Inn, Ye Olde Salutation Inn and Ye Olde Trip To Jerusalem to each be the oldest pub in Nottingham. The programme, first broadcast on 5 December 1998, concluded that of the three, Ye Olde Salutation was the oldest building but the Bell had been the earliest in use as a pub.

== See also ==
- Listed buildings in Nottingham (Bridge ward)
