= Beecroft's Toys =

English toy shop

Beecroft's Toys is an English online and mail order toy shop. Although founded in 1822 in Nottingham, it is now based in Hampshire. The company sources toys from around the world.

== History ==
Josiah Corbett founded the first toy and fancy goods shop at No. 2 High Street, Nottingham. The shop then moved to a larger premises on Chandler's Lane in 1844. In 1848 Corbett also hired a partner, Charles Beecroft, and in 1848 the toy store was renamed Beecroft's.

In the 20th century, Charles's son John Henry became Beecroft's owner, followed by Thomas and then his son John Hooton Beecroft. The shop moved frequently around the city during these periods, first to the Elizabethan House at 9 High Street, then to "Beecroft’s Corner" at the Exchange Building on Market Square. In 1926, the shop moved to 12 Pelham Street, then 42, and finally settled at 16-18 Street, Nottingham This toy shop is remembered in the memories of local people who were children at the time.

In the late 1870s, Beecroft's began issuing brass tokens – also known as tickets – as advertising. Each ticket is a stock reverse die showing the head of George III, George IV, or Queen Victoria, with the other side listing the address of Beecroft's at the time of issue. These tickets are now very rare and much sought after by numismatists and collectors. Farmers used to advertise for farm workers on market days – this led to the famous Beecroft's famous jingle ending "When we were boys, we bought our toys at Beecroft's. Now we are men, we go again to Beecroft's".

Between 1960 and 1972, Beecroft's held a regular stall at the Central Market in Nottingham and at the world famous Goose Fair.

The author Cecil Roberts wrote about his early memories of Beecroft's in his book A Terrace in the Sun:

… fortunate children had souvenirs that lasted for some weeks or months, toys that been bought for them in a fabulous shop called Beecroft’s which stood at the corner of the Exchange and had a permanent fringe of young faces pressed against the plate-glass windows. The favourite gifts for little girls were dressable dolls, with flexible limbs and rolling eyes, that miraculously squeaked when laid down or picked up. The choice for little boys lay between red-jacketed lead soldiers who stood on the ramparts of a fort with a drawbridge, and vertical steam engines, that sometimes worked when the methylated-spirit lamp was lit under the boilers.

David Beecroft, the last hereditary owner along with his wife Sue, was recently interviewed by an historian at the Victoria and Albert Museum in London for the Museum of Childhood Toy Project. The project is charting the history of British toymakers throughout the twentieth century.

In 2010, Beecroft's underwent a major rebranding when David and Sue Beecroft retired and handed the business on to Anne-Louise Game and Lindsey Macdonald. The toy shop continues to operate online and by mail order and is now based in Alton, Hampshire.
