= Plumptre Hospital =

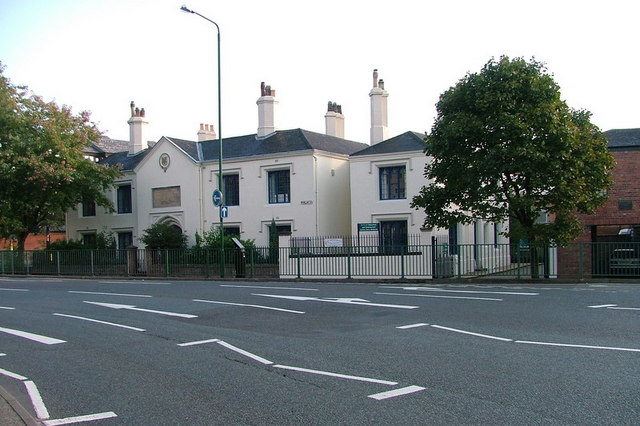

- Location within Nottingham
- 52°57′03″N 1°08′23″W
- Location: Nottingham, Nottinghamshire, England

History
- Built: 1823

Site notes
- Architect: Edward Staveley

Listed Building – Grade II

Plumptre Hospital was a charity in Nottingham, England, providing almshouse accommodation for 599 years from 1392 to 1991.

== History ==
John de Plumptre, Mayor of Nottingham, founded Plumptre Hospital in 1392. It was dedicated to the Blessed Virgin Mary and supported two priests and "thirteen poor women broken down of age and depressed of poverty". It was endowed with 13 properties around the town.

In 1414 the number of widows was reduced to seven and he gave the hospital his house, on the site that later became the Flying Horse Inn.

In 1650, Huntingdon Plumptre renovated it, raised the rents, and gave the widows a proper allowance: five shillings per month (equivalent to £39.27 in 2025), with sixpence extra at New Year (equivalent to £3.927 in 2025).

In the 1750s, another John Plumptre expanded the hospital so it could at last take the full 13 widows. They now received each year £13 10s (equivalent to £1,389 in 2025), a gown and a tonne of coal, and in addition the New Year sixpence (equivalent to £2.57 in 2025).

In the garden at the rear there is a plaque on the wall which reads 'Sufficit Meruisis' - 'it is enough to serve'.

Although the Plumptre family moved to Kent in 1756, they supported the charity by rebuilding the hospital again in 1823. Additional almshouses were built in Canal Street in 1956. (These were demolished around 2000).

By 1991, the charity no longer had the resources to improve Plumptre Hospital and its residents moved to the other almshouses. The building of 1823 was taken over by the Royal National Institute for the Blind in 2001.

== Inscription ==
Inscription on the building reads

PLUMPTRE HOSPITAL

Founded and endowed for the support of a Master, a priest, and thirteen poor Widows,
By John de Plumptre, A.D. 1392.
Repaired by Huntingdon Plumptre, Esq., 1650
By John Plumptre, Esq., A.D. 1751
By John Plumptre, his son, A.D. 1753.
First stone of the present Hospital was laid on the 1st of August, A.D. 1823,
By the Rev. Charles Thomas Plumptre, Rector of Claypole,
In Lincolnshire, on behalf of his father, John Plumptre, of Fredville,
In the county of Ken, Esq., the Master or Guardian of the said Hospital,

And a descendant of the Founder.

== See also ==
- Listed buildings in Nottingham (Bridge ward)
