= Robert Baston =

Robert Baston (fl. 1300), was an English Carmelite friar and prior of the abbey of Scarborough.

== Early life ==
Baston was born, according to Pitts, of an illustrious race, and not far from Nottingham, where Bale tells us he was buried. He seems to have acquired a great reputation in his own age for elegant verses. At Oxford, says Pitts, he was not unworthily crowned with laurel as a rhetorician and a poet. He is said to have been taken to Scotland by Edward I to sing his praises at the siege of Stirling (1304); and, according to Bale, he is Trivet's authority for his story of Edward's rash approach to the beleaguered garrison. But Trivet merely refers to a certain friar (religiosus quidam) as having related the incident. He is certain that he was taken on a similar errand by Edward II, when setting out on the expedition to relieve Stirling, that resulted in the Battle of Bannockburn.

== Coerced versification ==
Scottish chroniclers gloat over the story of his capture by Robert the Bruce, and tell how this king forced his prisoner to sing the defeat of his own countrymen as the price of his freedom. Baston's verses on this occasion are rhymed hexameters, with the rhymes disposed very irregularly. One couplet, describing Robert Bruce before the engagement, may serve as an example:—

Cernit, discernit acies pro Marte paratas;
Tales mortales gentes censet superatas.

Archibald Bower gives the verses in full as "worthy for their goodness to be set on a candlestick;" but the Scottish writers of the next century were fully alive to their faults, which the English ascribed to the fact of their author's having penned them with an unwilling muse and against his conscience.

== The Carmelites ==
Anthony à Wood tells us that it was owing to this Robert Baston that Edward II gave the Carmelites his mansion of Beaumont for their Oxford schools. As he narrates the story, Baston, when defeat was inevitable, assured the king of safety if he would only pray to the Virgin; and Edward thereupon promised to erect a house for the Carmelite brotherhood, if he reached home in safety – a vow which was fulfilled at the parliament of York in 1317, when the king gave the brethren his Oxford mansion outside the walls, just by the north gate of the city, with a provision for twenty-four friars. Tanner quotes from a manuscript register that in 1318 friar Robert Baston, the Carmelite, was admitted to hear confessions in the Diocese of Lincoln.

== Other writings ==
According to Bale and Pitts, Baston was the author of various other poems besides the one just alluded to above, "De Striveliniensi obsidione." His other works consisted of poems on the second Scottish war, on the various states of the world—directed against popes, cardinals, and kings—works against the luxury of priests, a disputation concerning Dives and Lazarus, a book against "artists" (Contra Artistas), poems and rhythms, tragedies and comedies, and a collection of "Orationes Synodales." Several of Baston's poetical works are to be found in the British Museum.

== Biographical errors ==
Pitts has committed several egregious mistakes in his account of this writer, making him die in 1310, four years before the battle of Bannockburn, which he celebrates in verse; and Bale's vaguer language leaves the impression that he too was labouring under a similar error. On the whole, it seems hard to escape from the conclusion that Robert Baston's biographers have made him present in Scotland on two occasions instead of one, and have confounded the siege of Stirling under Edward I with the siege of the same castle that, under Edward II, resulted in the battle of Bannockburn. Leland seems to have originated the mistake, and the rest have blindly followed him.
