= Vin Baston =

Irish hurler (1919–1963)

Vincent Baston
Personal information
- Native name: Uinseann Beastún (Irish)
- Nickname: Vin
- Born: 5 August 1919 Passage East, County Waterford, Ireland
- Died: 4 June 1963 (aged 43) Stephens Barracks, Kilkenny, Ireland
- Occupation: Army officer
- Height: 5 ft 10 in (178 cm)

Sport
- Sport: Hurling
- Position: Centre-back
Clubs
- Years: Club
- Passage; Army
Club titles
- Galway titles: 2
Inter-county
- Years: County
- 1939-1950: Waterford
Inter-county titles
- Munster titles: 1
- All-Irelands: 1
- NHL: 0

Vincent Baston (5 August 1919 – 4 June 1963) was an Irish hurler. At club level he played for Passage in Waterford and Army in Galway and was centre-back on the Waterford senior hurling team that won the 1948 All-Ireland Championship.

After beginning his club career with the Passage junior team, with whom he won a Waterford Junior Championship medal, Baston subsequently won two Galway Senior Championship medals with the Army club in 1947 and 1948.

Baston made his first appearance on the inter-county scene as a member of the Waterford minor hurling team in 1937. He subsequently joined the Waterford senior hurling team and made his debut during the 1939-40 National League. Baston established himself as a key member of the starting fifteen and was at centre-back in 1948 when Waterford won their first All-Ireland Championship, having earlier won the Munster Championship title.

== Playing career ==
=== Passage ===
Baston enjoyed a lengthy club hurling with Passage, however, he never won a championship medal.

=== Waterford ===
Baston first came to prominence on the inter-county scene as a member of the Waterford junior hurling team in 1937.

Two years later in 1939 Baston joined the Waterford senior hurler, however, the team had to yield to Cork who dominated the provincial championship between 1939 and 1947.

Having been defeated by the Rebels in the provincial decider of 1943, both sides qualified for the Munster showpiece once again in 1948. While Cork were the favourites a close game developed. Just a single point separated the sides at the full-time whistle as Waterford won by 4-7 to 3-9. It was Baston's first Munster medal. A subsequent defeat of Galway at the penultimate stage set up an All-Ireland final meeting with Dublin. The Metropolitans got off to a slow start and only recorded their first score, a point, after twenty-two minutes.Waterford powered ahead and had a nine-point interval lead. Dublin fought back in the second half, however, Waterford took control towards the end. A 6-7 to 4-2 score line gave Baston an All-Ireland medal. It was also Waterford's maiden championship title.

Waterford failed to land any further provincial or All-Ireland titles in the following few seasons. Baston retired from inter-county hurling in 1950.

=== Munster ===
Baston also had the honour of lining out with Munster and Connacht in the inter-provincial series of games.

In 1947 he joined the Munster team, however, the year ultimately ended in defeat. It was the first of five successive years with the provincial hurling team.

Munster bounced back in 1948 to record a 3-5 to 2-5 defeat of Leinster in the decider. It was Baston's first Railway Cup medal. It was the first of four-in-a-row for Baston, as further defeats of Connacht and Leinster (twice), gave him further inter-provincial mementos in 1949, 1950 and 1951.

== Honours ==
Passage

- Waterford Junior Hurling Championship (1): 1937

Army

- Galway Senior Hurling Championship (2): 1947, 1948

Waterford

- All-Ireland Senior Hurling Championship (1): 1948
- Munster Senior Hurling Championship (1): 1948

Munster

- Railway Cup (4): 1948, 1949, 1950, 1951
