= Snotingas =

Ancient tribe in England

The Snotingas were an Anglian tribe who gave their name to the settlements of Nottingham, first recorded as Snotengaham, and nearby Sneinton, first recorded as Snotinton. The tribe's name means "followers of Snot", an Old English personal name.

Nottingham's St Mary's Church was probably established as a minster as early as the late 7th century, and the extent of its minster parish is likely to represent the original extent of the Snotingas' territory. Although determining this area is complicated by the large amount of land held by St Mary's granted to Lenton Priory after the Norman Conquest, it certainly included Whiston in the north of the modern city, and probably the areas of Lenton, Radford, Basford, Arnold, West Bridgford, Wilford, Barton and Clifton.

== Bibliography ==
- Gurnham, Richard (2010), A History of Nottingham, Andover: Phillimore & Co, ISBN 1860776582
