= Ye Olde Trip to Jerusalem =

Listed pub and tourist attraction in Nottingham, England

- The pub in 2026

- Location within Nottingham
- Former names: The Pilgrim

General information
- Type: Public house
- Location: 1 Brewhouse Yard, Nottingham, England
- Coordinates: 52.9493°N 1.1526°W
- Completed: c. 1650–1660; 366 years ago
- Renovated: 19th century (extended); 1996–1998 (altered)
- Owner: Greene King

Design and construction
- Designations

Listed Building – Grade II
- Official name: Ye Olde Trip to Jerusalem public house
- Designated: 11 August 1952
- Reference no.: 1271192

Website
- Official website

Ye Olde Trip to Jerusalem is a Grade II listed public house in Brewhouse Yard in Nottingham, England. The pub claims to have been established in 1189 and is one of several establishments that claim to be the oldest pub in England, although no documentary evidence supports this date. The present building dates principally from the late 17th and 18th centuries, with later additions, and incorporates an extensive series of rock-cut caves and cellars excavated into the sandstone of Castle Rock. It is included on CAMRA's National Inventory of Historic Pub Interiors, where it is recognised as having an interior of "outstanding national historic importance".

== History ==
According to its official listing, the building is a public house dating principally from the late 17th and 18th centuries, with extensions added during the 19th century. The pub claims to have been established in 1189, the year Richard the Lionheart became king and Pope Gregory VIII called for the Third Crusade, although no documentary evidence supports this date. The caves cut into the sandstone of Castle Rock behind the pub, on which Nottingham Castle stands, are believed to have been used as a brewhouse for the castle and may date from around the time of its foundation in 1067. A structure on the site is shown on a map by John Speed of 1610, while the oldest parts of the present building are generally dated to between 1650 and 1660.

By 1751 the building was operating as an inn known as The Pilgrim and was shortly afterwards purchased by William Standford. The earliest recorded use of the name "Ye Olde Trip to Jerusalem" dates from 1799. The pub is one of several establishments that claim to be the oldest in England, alongside Ye Olde Salutation Inn and the Bell Inn in Nottingham, Ye Olde Boar's Head in Middleton, Greater Manchester, and Ye Olde Fighting Cocks in St Albans, Hertfordshire.

On 11 August 1952, Ye Olde Trip to Jerusalem was designated a Grade II listed building. The pub was associated with the Ward family, who owned the property for around a century. A stained-glass panel above the entrance records Ada G. Etherington-Ward as a licensed brewer and retailer. The family sold the pub to Hardy & Hanson's Brewery in 1990.

Alterations carried out between 1996 and 1998 created additional rooms within former living accommodation and rock-cut areas of the building. The project received a joint Campaign for Real Ale (CAMRA) and English Heritage award. It is regarded by CAMRA as having an interior of "outstanding national historic importance" and is rated three stars on its National Inventory of Historic Pub Interiors. As of September 2026, the freehold was owned by Greene King.

== Architecture ==
=== Exterior ===
The building combines brick and timber construction with a series of rock-cut caves and cellars excavated into the sandstone of Castle Rock. Its roofs are covered in clay tiles. The plan is broadly Z-shaped, comprising a central range between the street and the cliff face with later wings extending to either side.

The earliest part of the pub is a two-storey timber-framed building of the 17th century, set against the base of Castle Rock. A taller three-storey corner section, dating from the first half of the 18th century, forms a prominent landmark and bears a painted sign claiming the inn was established in 1189, a tradition recorded since at least the 19th century but unsupported by documentary evidence.

Additional ranges extend to the south-west and around a courtyard overlooking the rock face, where parts of the sandstone cliff have been enclosed to accommodate rooms and cellar entrances. The principal entrance is through a small brick extension at the north-eastern corner of the site, added against the cliff face and incorporating an external serving window.

=== Interior ===
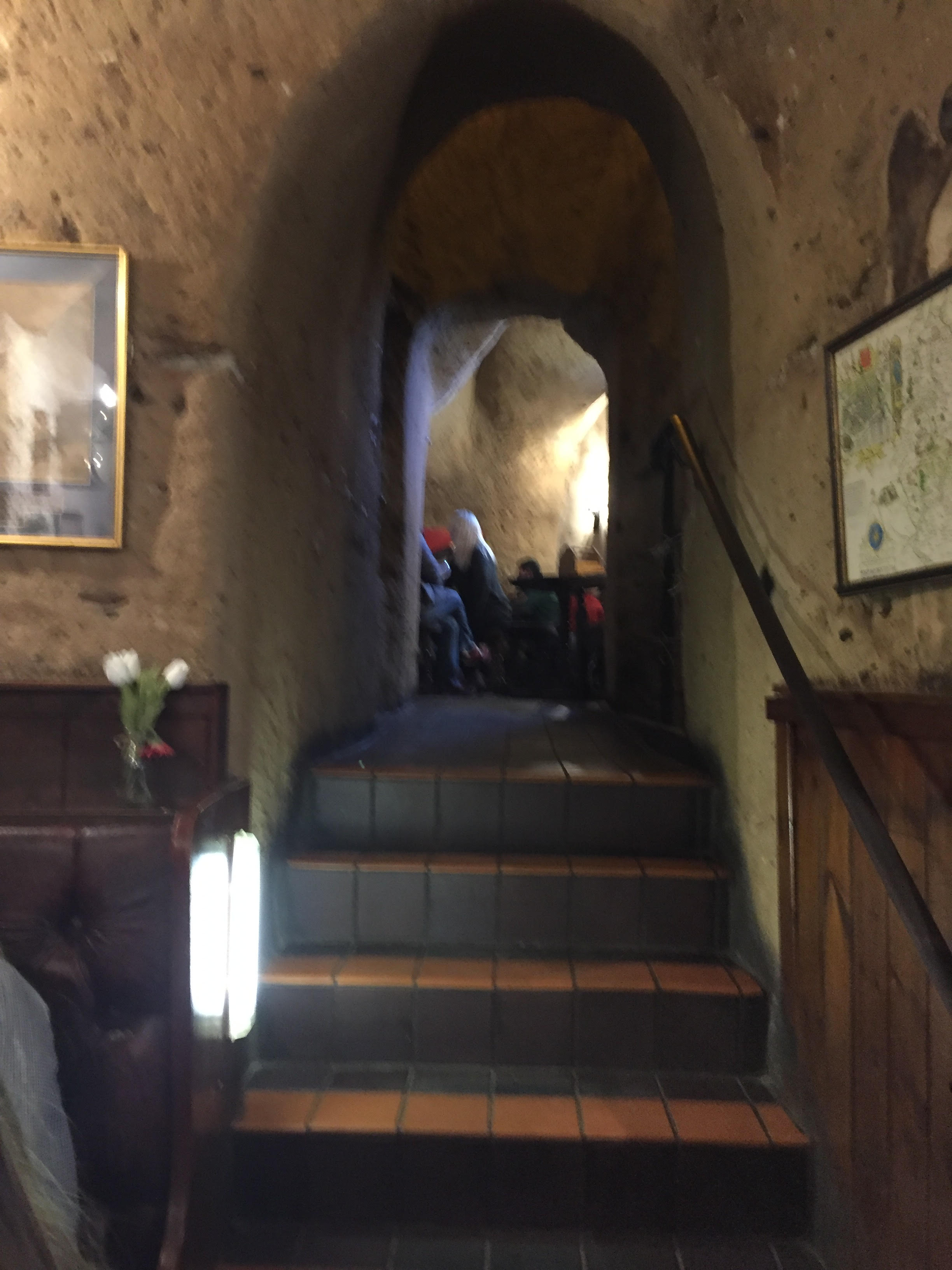
Interior view in 2017, showing the rock walls

The interior comprises a series of bars, lounges, snugs and cellars arranged around the sandstone caves and chambers cut into Castle Rock. The ground floor retains a number of historic public rooms, including the Ward Room, Money Bar, Chimney Alcove and Yorkey's Lounge, many of which incorporate exposed rock faces and traditional features such as stone-flagged floors, fireplaces and timber panelling. The Ward Room also preserves facilities for "Ringing the bull", a traditional pub game.

At the rear of the building, upper-level rooms have been formed within large rock-cut caves. These include the Rock Lounge and Museum Room, the former containing fittings that date largely from the 1930s. Openings created during alterations in the 1990s improved access between the cave chambers.

The upper floors of the 17th-century range are now used primarily for service functions, although historic timber framing and traditional plasterwork survive. Beneath the building is an extensive network of rock-cut cellars, comprising several chambers excavated directly into the sandstone and reflecting the site's long-standing use for storage and hospitality.

== See also ==
- Listed buildings in Nottingham (Radford and Park ward)
