= Nottingham Whitefriars =

Carmelite Monastery in Nottingham, England

- Coat of arms of the Carmelite Order

- Location within Nottingham
- Interactive map of Nottingham Whitefriars

Monastery information
- Other names: Nottingham Carmelite Friary, Nottingham White Friary, Whitefriars, Nottingham
- Order: Carmelite
- Established: 1271
- Disestablished: 1539

Site
- Location: Nottingham
- Coordinates: 52.952631°N 1.15184°W
- Visible remains: None

Nottingham Whitefriars is a former Carmelite monastery located in Nottingham, England.

== History ==
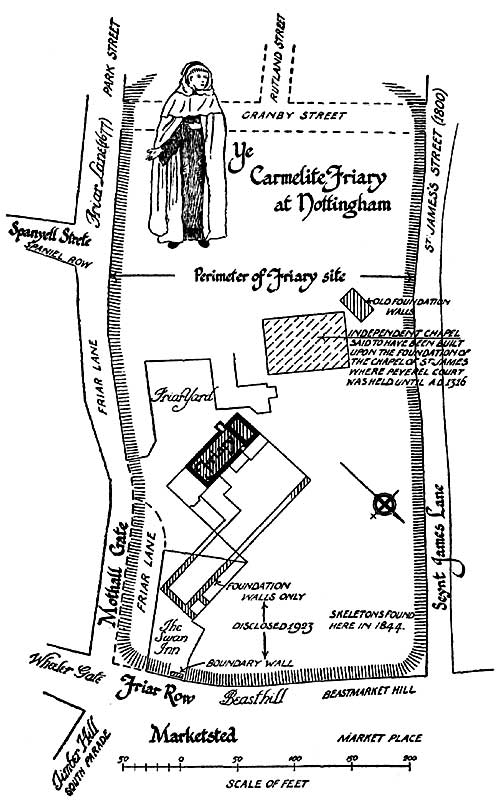
A plan showing the known buildings of Nottingham Carmelite Friary (Nottingham Whitefriars). The Old Market Square is at the bottom of this image.

The friary was reputedly founded by Reginald de Grey, 1st Baron Grey de Wilton, and Sir John Shirley around 1276, but this has been found to be incorrect. The foundation of the friary is unlikely as, "all the foundation that was permissible for a friary of the Mendicant orders (to which the Carmelites belong) was the gift of a site". The date is also implausible as in 1272 (four years before the reputed date) the friary was given 10 oaks to repair their church by King Henry III.

The friary was in fact founded sometime before 1271. The land the priory was built on may have, however, been gifted by Reginald de Grey. The Royal Confirmation Charter given by King Edward II in 1319 records the donation of two plots of land by de Grey. The two plots were adjacent: one "in the French borough of Nottingham and the other in St. James's Lane". The friary is thought to have been held in the townspeople's affections as the friary site was extended with numerous donations of land and tenements adjacent to it. These donations were made by: Henry and Agnes Curtyse, William and Claricia de Chesterfield (and their sons and daughters), William and Agnes de Crophill, William de Lonnesdale, Ralph de Lokynton, William de Mekesburgh, Thomas de Radford, Nicholas de Shelford, William de Strelley, John de Thorneton, Cecilia de Ufton, Robert de Ufton, William de Watton, John de Wymondswold, Robert le Carter, William le Chaundeler, John le Collier, Ranulph le Leper, John and Sarah le Netherd, Alice le Palmere, Henry Putrel. Their precinct was extended again in October 1319, following the donation of an 80 ft by 60 ft parcel of land, by Hugh de Bingham.

Edward II was very fond of the friary. In his Royal Confirmation Charter, he granted the friars freedom from the 5s. 6d. rent they owed to the crown, "on account of the special affection that we have and bear to the said prior and brethren." In 1316, whilst visiting Clipston, Nottinghamshire, King Edward had given the friary the Chapel of Saint James, which had formerly belonged to Lenton Priory, and which was adjacent to their friary.

In October 1393, after killing his wife Alice, Henry de Whitley sought sanctuary within the friary. As long he stayed within the church, he could not be arrested for his crimes; his property (valued at 11s. 2½d) was, however, seized by the Nottingham town authorities.

The friary was home to two notable friars during the 14th century. Philip Baston of Nottingham (d.1320) "studied Philosophy and Divinity at Oxford and became a famous poet and orator". John Clipston of Nottingham (d. 1378) was a "Doctor and Professor of Divinity at Cambridge". He was reputed for his teachings and writings, and was buried within the friary at Nottingham.

The friary was visited by King Henry VIII in August 1511. "He made an offering at the Rood of the White Friars".

In 1532 the prior, Richard Sherwood, killed one of his friars, William Bacon, during a fight which broke out after they had been drinking. Sherwood hit Bacon on 21 February 1532, and Bacon died the following day. Sherwood was, however, pardoned for the killing by King Henry VIII, on 10 May 1532.

The friary was dissolved as part of Henry VIII's dissolution of the monasteries. It was surrendered by Prior Roger Cappe on 5 February 1539. The friary was, at the time, home to six friars: William Cooke, William Frost, John Roberts, William Smithson, William Thorpe, Robert Wilson.

The friary site was granted, in 1541, to James Sturley of Nottingham.

=== List of Priors ===
- Robert, occurs 1379
- Robert Sutton, B.D., occurs 1442
- John Mott, occurs 1482
- Thomas Gregg, occurs 1495/96
- Thomas Smithson, occurs 1513
- Richard Sherwood, occurs 1532
- Roger Cappe, surrendered the friary in 1539

== Location and remains ==
Nothing remains of the former friary. It stood near to the south-west corner of Old Market Square; the priory precinct occupying the area between Friar Lane and St James Street. The area has been heavily developed since the dissolution and the site has been "almost solidly built over". It is remembered locally in the street name: "Friar Lane". (Note: Friar Lane, Nottingham, NG1 6BS)

In 1923, during work to widen Friar Lane, part of the former friary was uncovered in the south-west corner of Old Market Square. Most of the priory remains (around two-thirds) lay on the land which had been acquired by the Corporation of Nottingham for the street widening. This portion was not excavated or recorded, as the new road was laid over the top almost immediately. The land which contained the eastern portion of the ruins was to be used for construction. This allowed time for the few remains to be documented while the new foundations were dug.

Adjacent to Friars Row, the remains were of a rectangular building of unknown function, with walls averaging 2 ft 8 in (0.81 m) thick. Aligned east-west, the building had encaustic tile floors. Also found was a 2 ft (0.61 m) thick section of the former precinct wall, and several skeletons.
