= Nottingham Council House =

Municipal building in Nottinghamshire, England

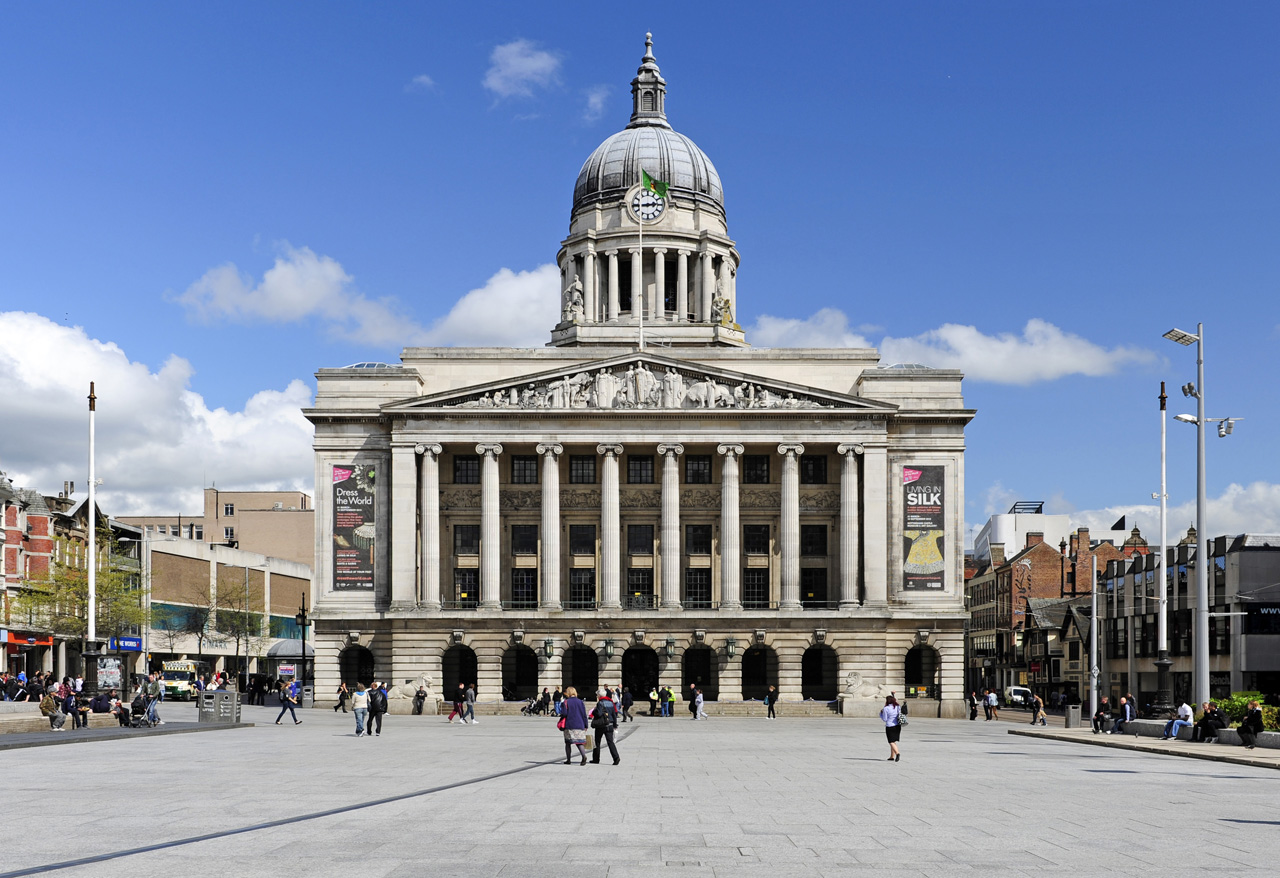
- A view from the front

General information
- Type: Municipal Headquarters
- Architectural style: Neo-Baroque
- Location: Nottingham, England, Old Market Square, Nottingham NG1 2DT
- Coordinates: 52°57′12″N 01°08′55″W
- Construction started: 1927
- Completed: 1929; 97 years ago
- Client: Nottingham Corporation

Design and construction
- Architect: Thomas Cecil Howitt

Listed Building – Grade II*
- Official name: Council House, Exchange Buildings and adjoining shops and bank
- Designated: 4 February 1988
- Reference no.: 1270582

The Nottingham Council House is the former city hall of Nottingham, England. The 200 feet (61 m) high dome that rises above the city is the centrepiece of the skyline and presides over the Old Market Square, which is also referred to as the "City Centre". The building is Grade II* listed, and has retail units at street-level.

== History ==
Designed by Thomas Cecil Howitt in the Neo-Baroque style and built between 1927 and 1929, the Council House was commissioned to replace the former Nottingham Exchange.

Housed within the belfry is the 'Little John' hour bell – the deepest toned clock bell in the United Kingdom, weighing over 10 tonnes (10 t); its strike can be heard for a distance of 7 miles (11 km).

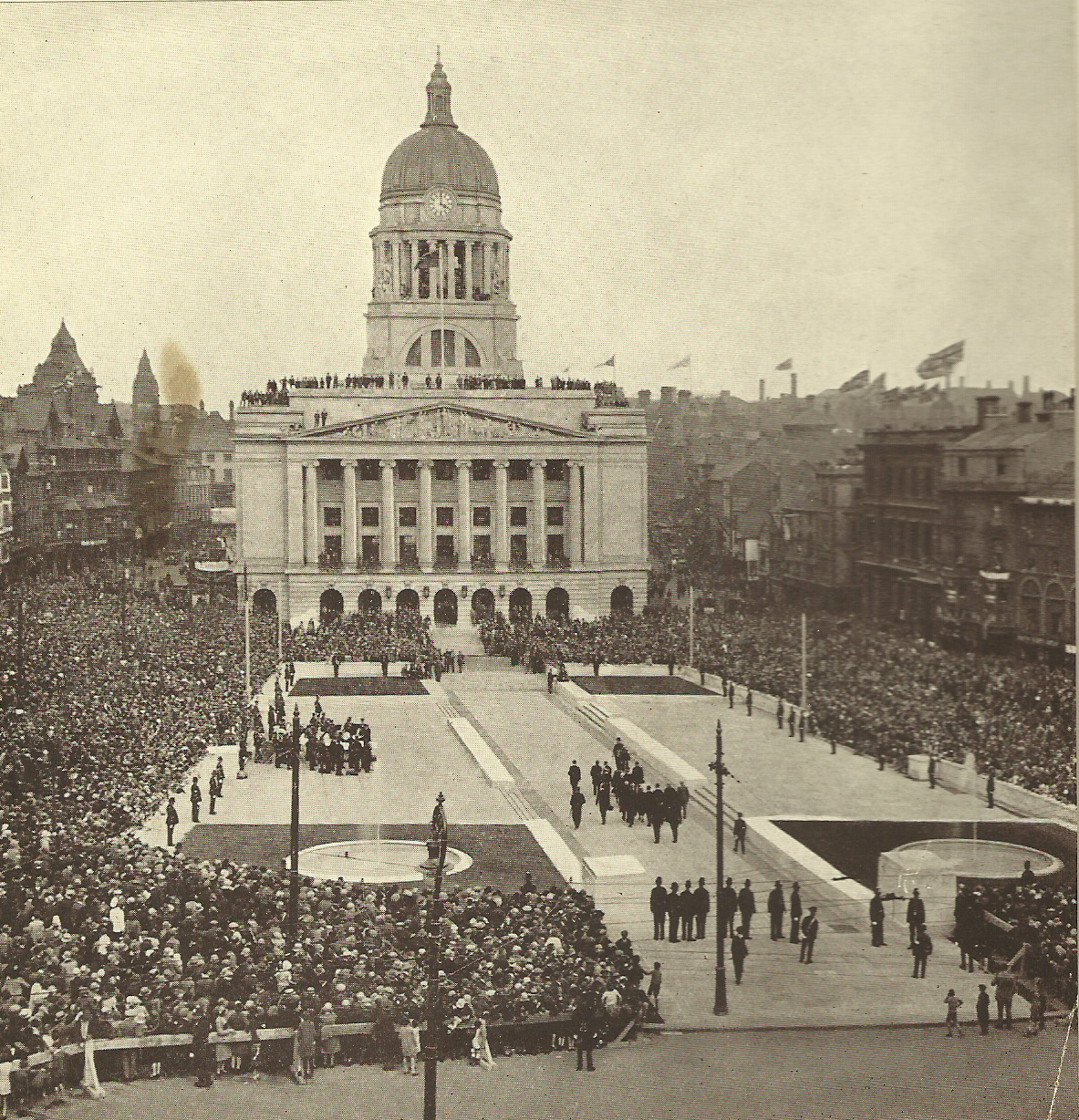
Scene in the Old Market Square for the official opening of the Council House, 22 May 1929

The foundation stone (behind the left-hand lion as you approach the building) was laid by Alderman Herbert Bowles (Chairman of the Estates Committee), on 17 March 1927. The total cost of the building at the time was £502,876 (equivalent to £27,620,000 in 2025). By the time the bill was finally cleared in 1981, the total including interest was £620,294 (equivalent to £34,070,000 in 2025). The building was officially opened by the Prince of Wales (later King Edward VIII and subsequently the Duke of Windsor) on 22 May 1929.

The building has staged many high-profile occasions with royalty, statesmen and women, and stars of the stage and screen. Both the FA Cup in 1959, and the European Cup in 1979 and 1980, have been held aloft from its balcony.

Since Nottingham City Council relocated councillors' offices to Loxley House in 2010, the Council House is seldom used for day-to-day administrative functions. Since April 2011, the building also serves as the chief Register Office for Births, Marriages and Deaths in the city.

== Exterior ==
The Council House and Exchange Buildings (to the rear) are constructed of Portland stone from the same quarry used by Sir Christopher Wren for St Paul's Cathedral in London.

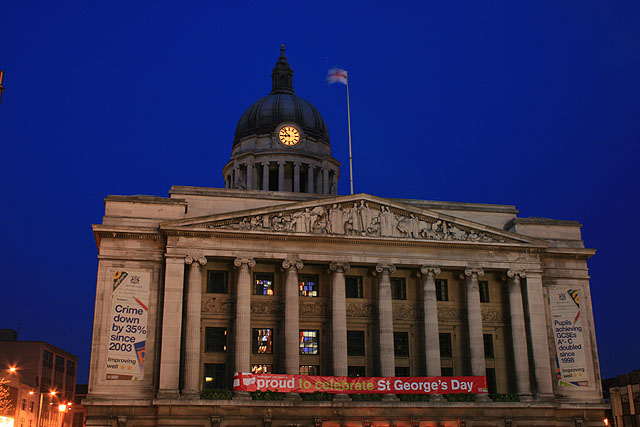
The Council House at night

The terrace overlooking the Old Market Square has eight massive columns, above which, are 21 figures representing the activities of the council, also modelled by Joseph Else FRBS, the Principal of the Nottingham School of Art from 1923 to 1939. The frieze behind depicts traditional local crafts such as bell founding, mining and alabaster carving.

== Interior ==
The interior of the building is elaborately decorated:

=== Ground floor ===
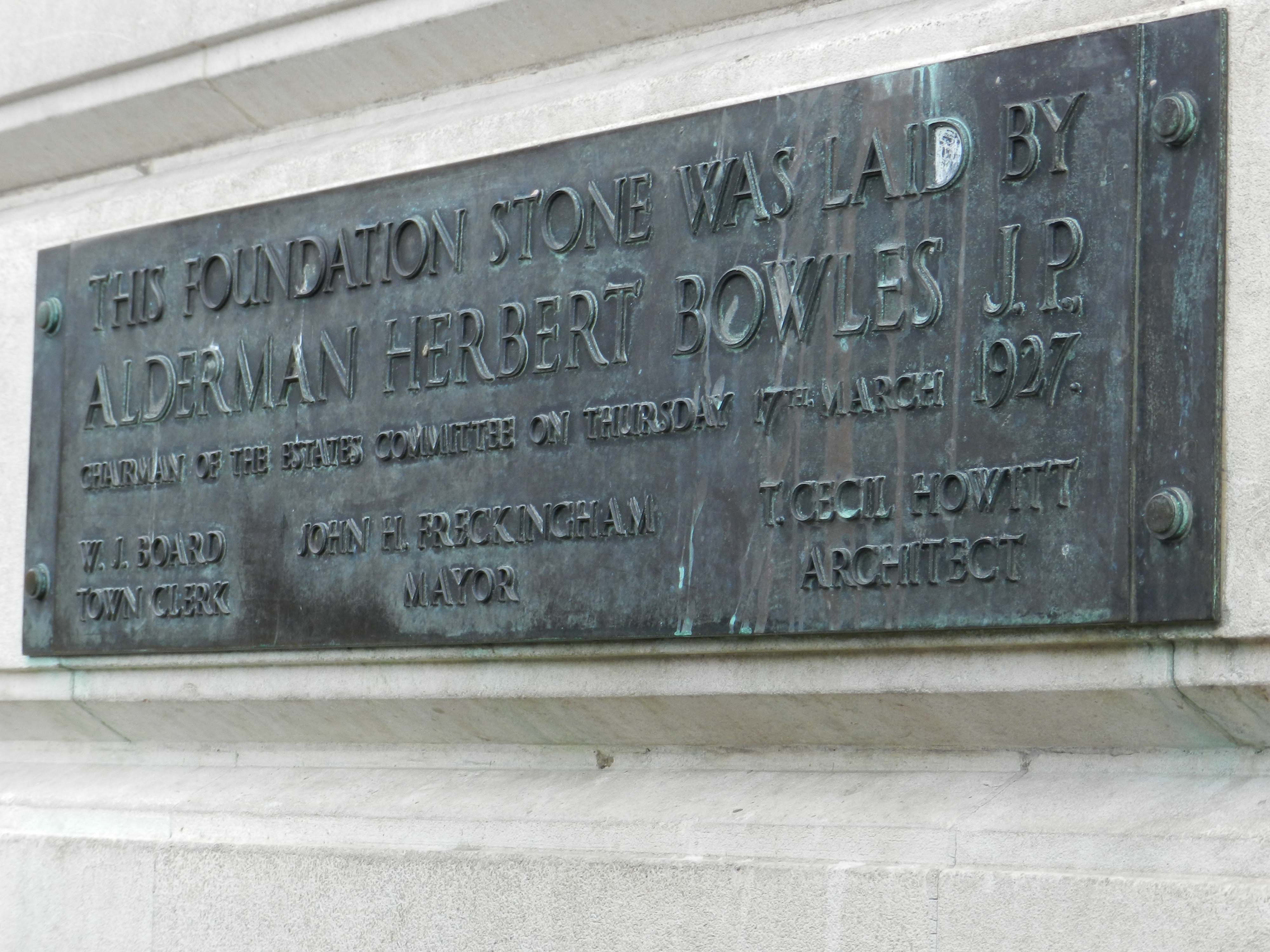
Foundation stone

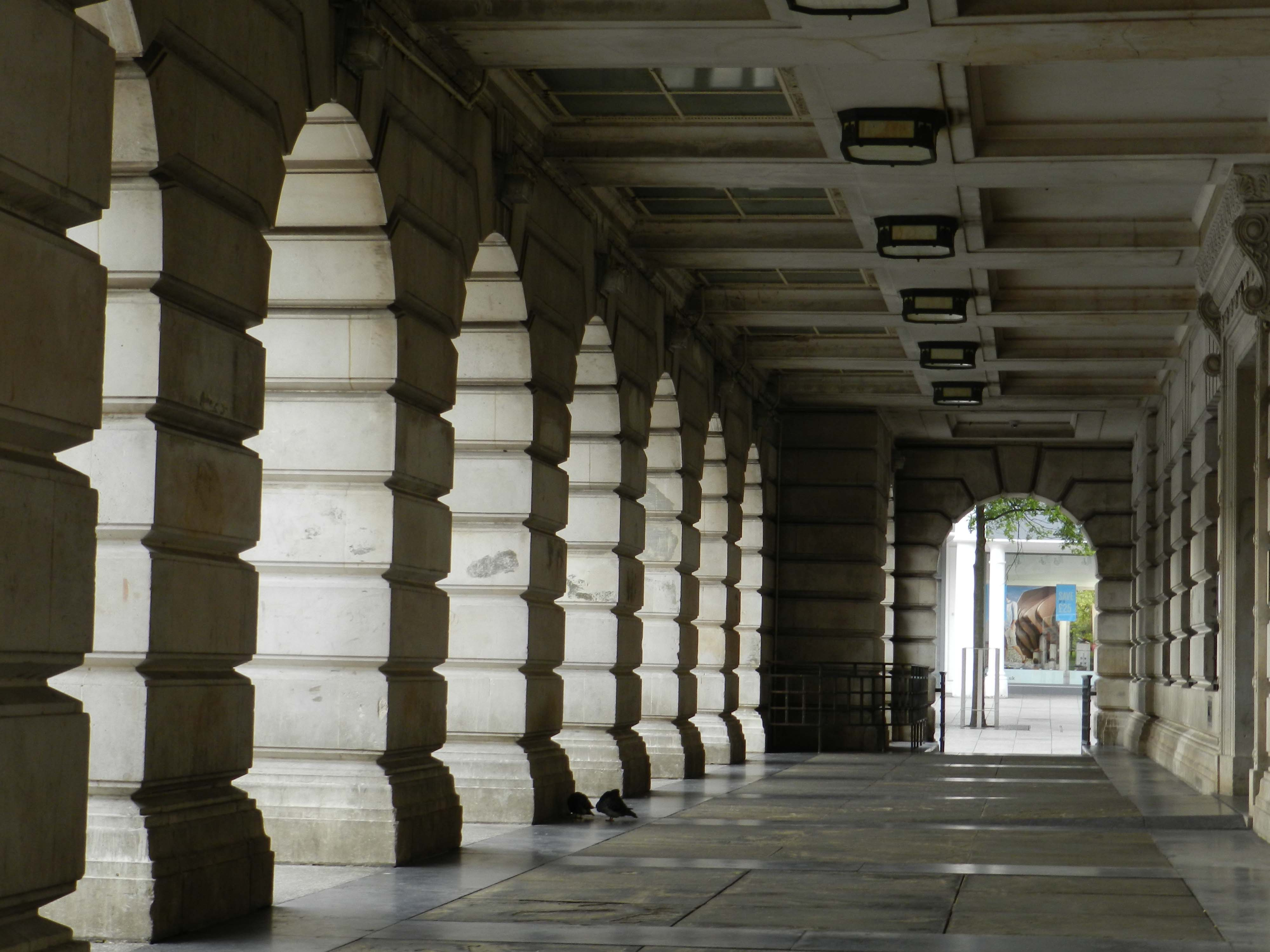
Entrance loggia

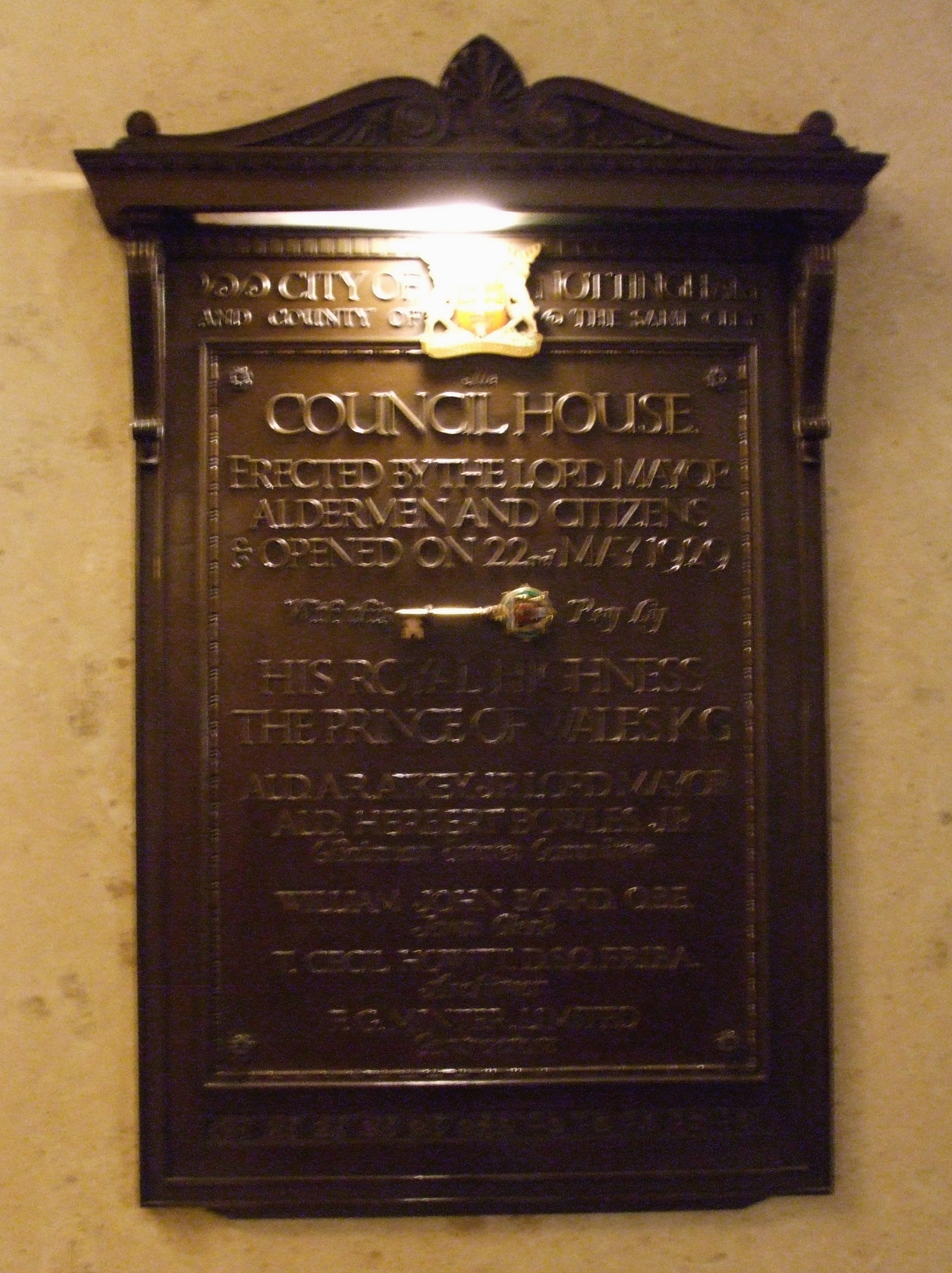
Golden Key used to open the Council House

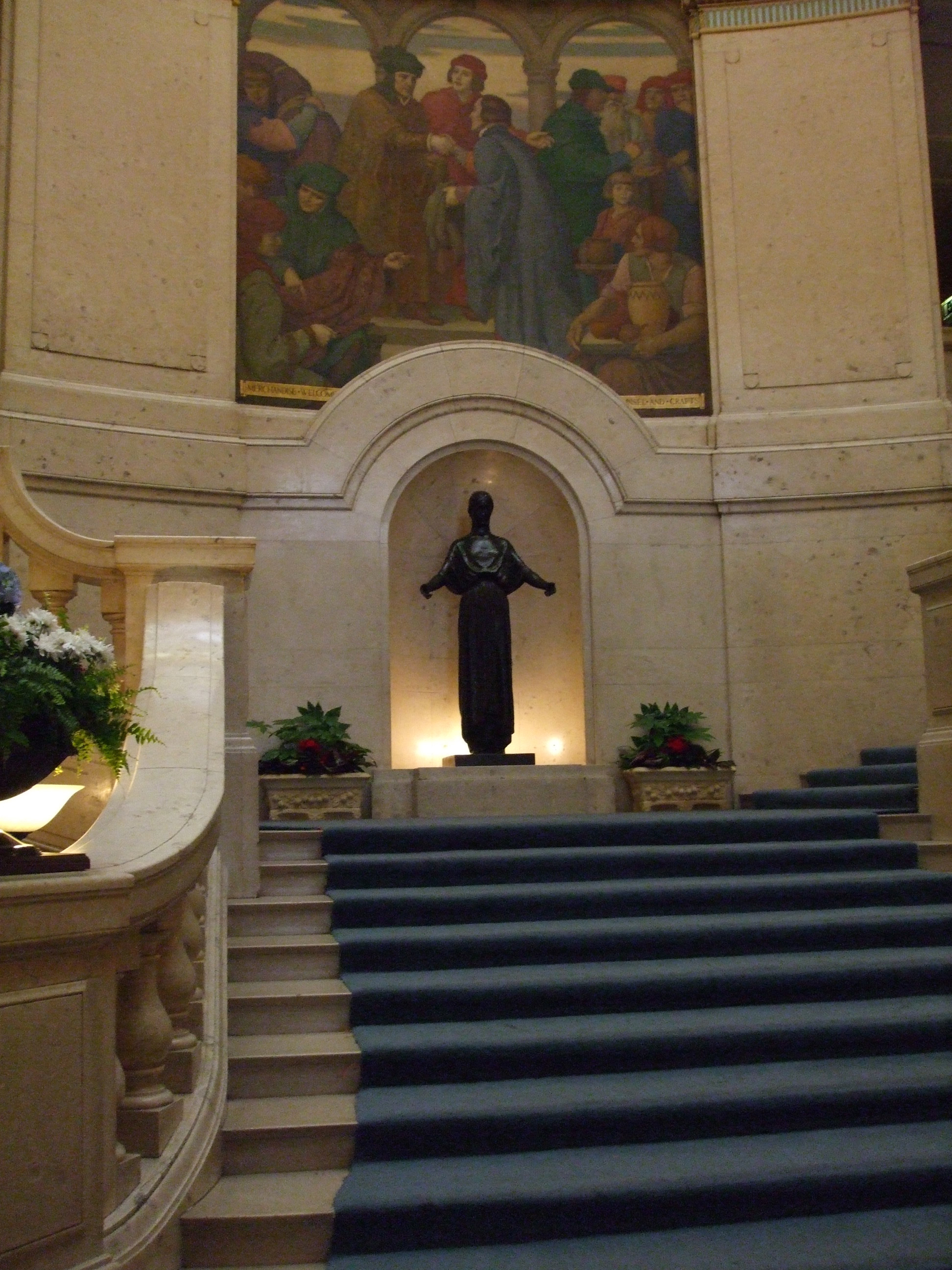
Ceremonial staircase

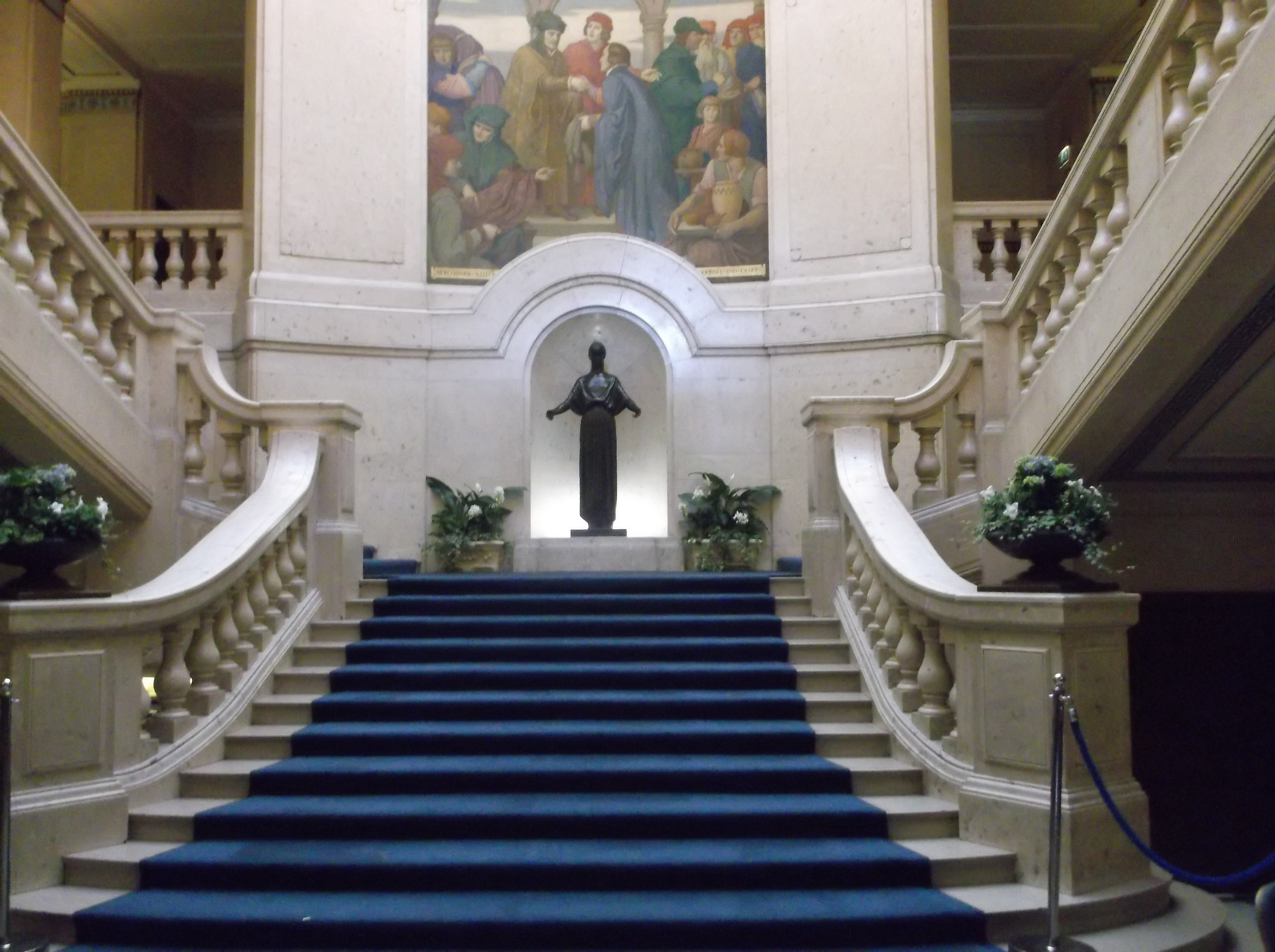
Ceremonial staircase

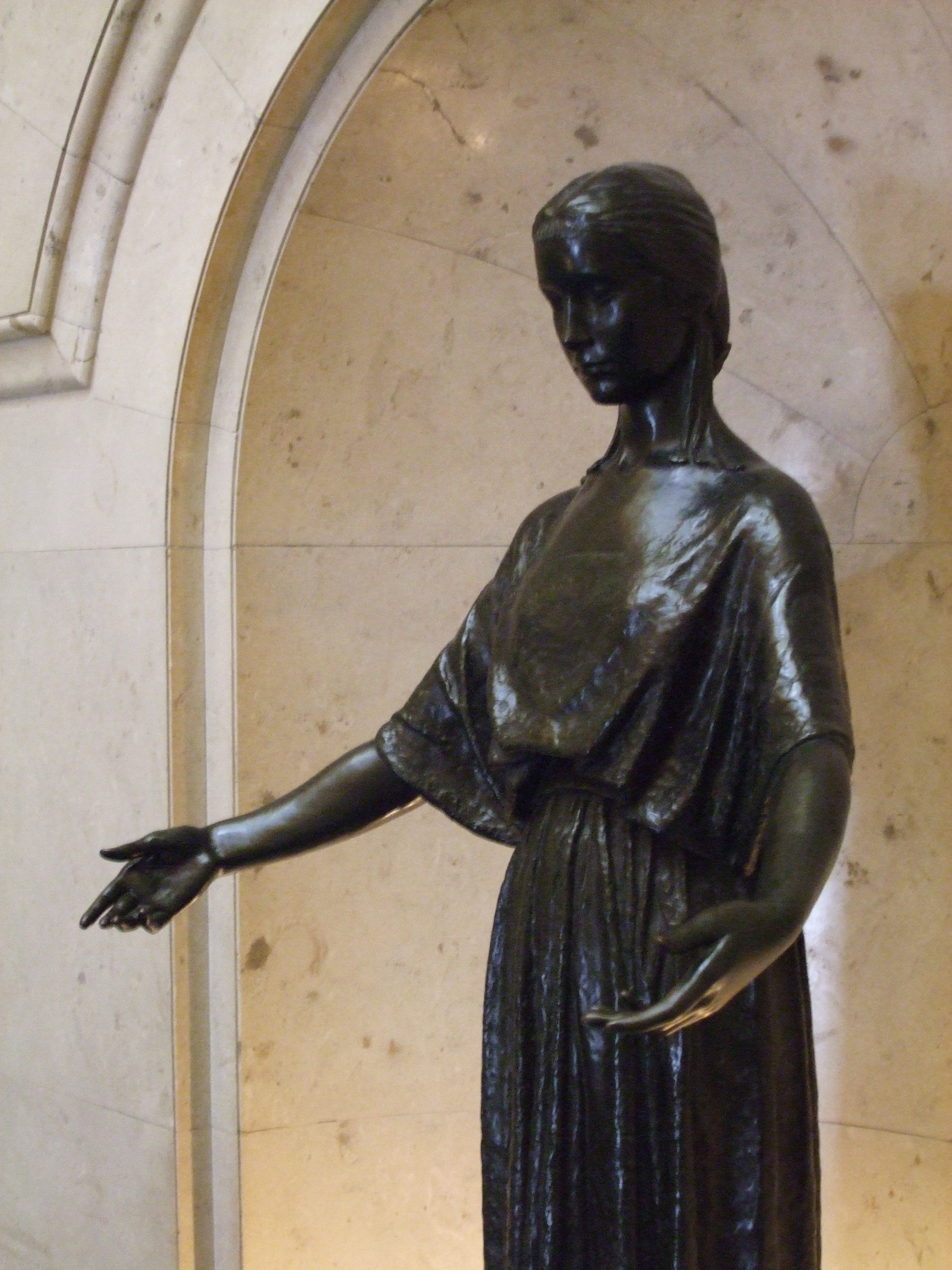
'Welcome' – statue by Sir William Reid Dick
- The entrance hall has columns, walls, floor and made from Italian marble. The City Arms are inlaid as a mosaic in the centre of the floor. Bronze plaques on the left (northern) wall list the Honorary Freemen of the City of Nottingham; whilst those on the right (southern) wall list the city's Honorary Aldermen. Another plaque commemorates the opening of the building in 1929, including the golden key used by the Prince of Wales to open the doors. In a nod to modernity, a final plaque displays the building's energy efficiency rating.
- A grand sweeping marble staircase leads up to the reception rooms on the first floor. At the top of the stairs is a bronze cast figure entitled 'Welcome', by Sir William Reid Dick. It features a female figure with arms outstretched, welcoming visitors to the Council House. Presented to the city by Sir Julien Cahn the statue was unveiled on 10 February 1931.

=== First floor ===
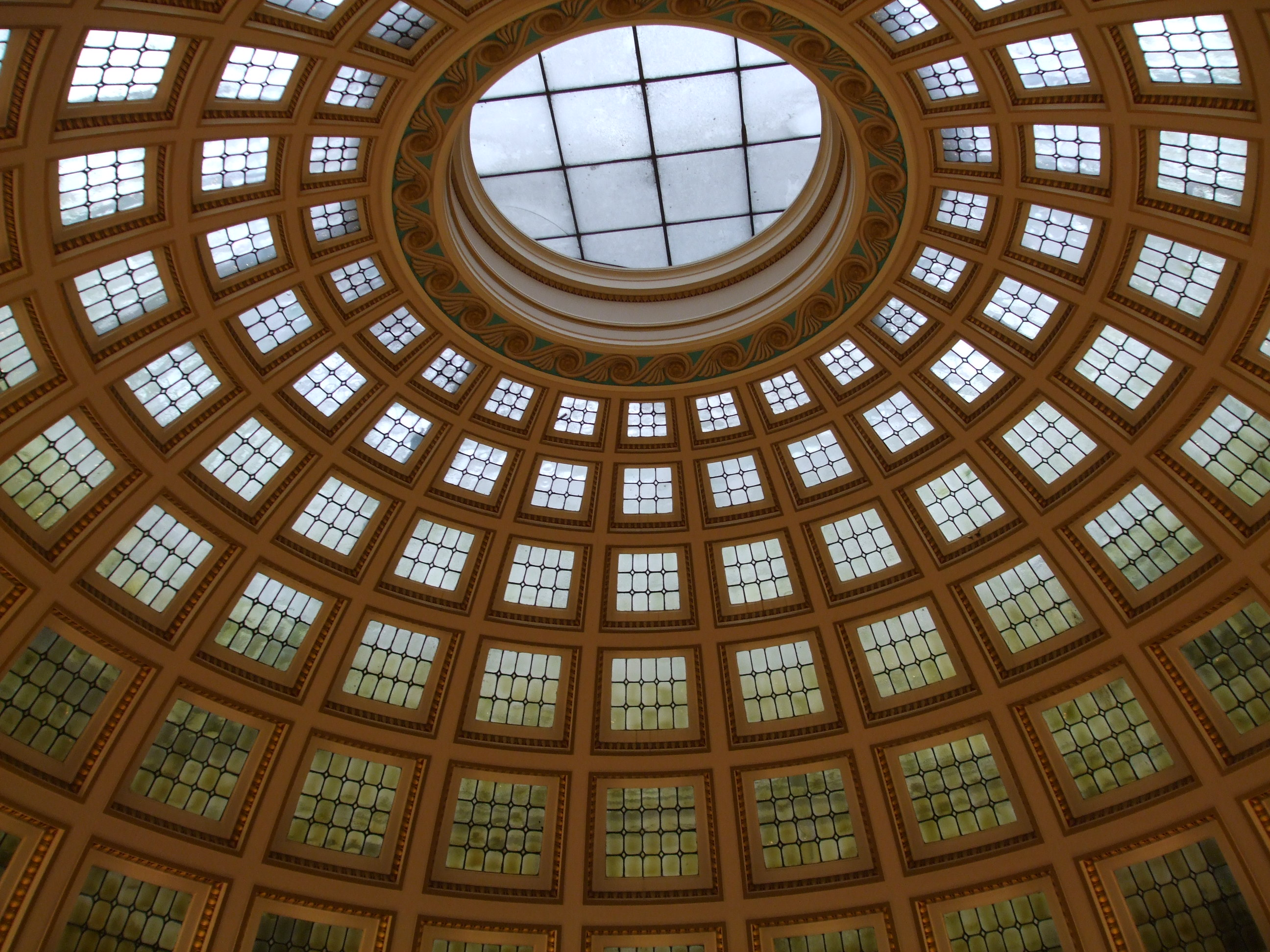
The dome above the staircase

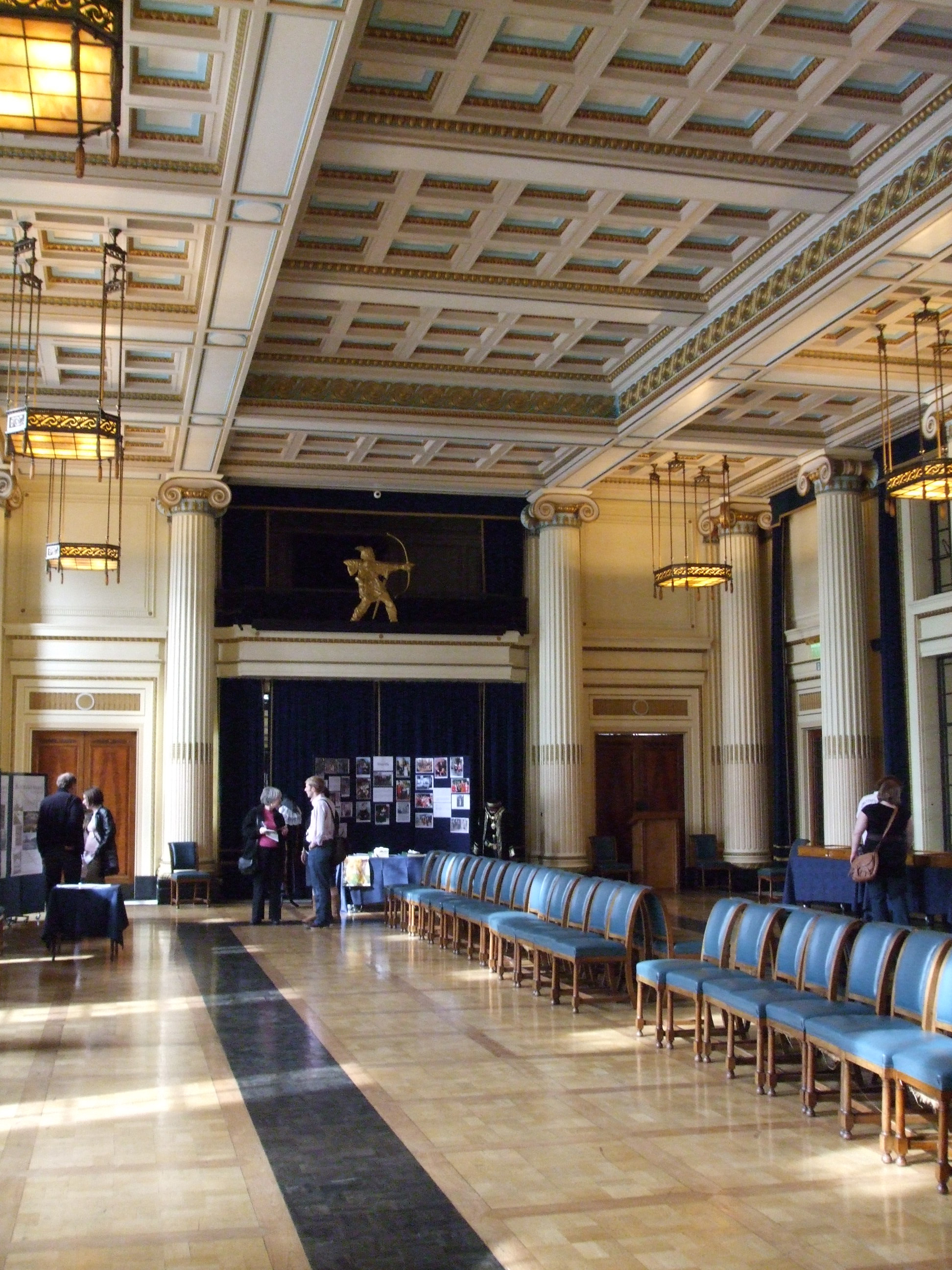
The ballroom

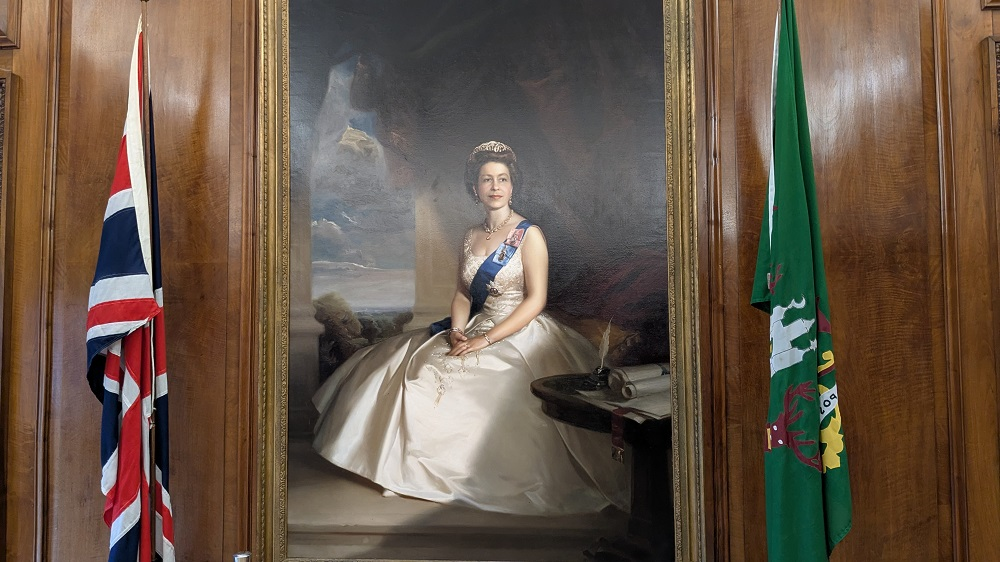
Queen's portrait in the dining room
- The ballroom is similar in style to one at the Palace of Versailles, with gilt embellished columns and a highly decorated ceiling. The fine parquet sprung floor is made from oak, walnut and ebonised pearwood. French windows lead out onto the balcony overlooking the Old Market Square.
- The dining room has Ancona walnut panelling and an Italian marble fireplace, and is generally for smaller events. The room is dominated by a portrait of Queen Elizabeth II by John Townsend, presented to the city by Mr Lewis H. Colton on 11 July 1970.
- Display cabinets house the city's ceremonial maces and silverware gifts given to the City Council by visiting dignitaries. There is also a display giving details of the ship HMS Nottingham. A matchstick model of the Council House building invites donations from visitors to the Lord Mayor's charities.
- The Lord Mayor's Suite includes the parlour, panelled in carved walnut, with an adjoining sitting room featuring oak panelling recovered from Aston Hall in Derbyshire.

=== Second floor ===
- The committee room contains a horseshoe table in walnut veneer, and is where most executive board meetings were held before the council moved meetings to Loxley House on Station Street in 2010.
- The sheriff's parlour (originally that of the Lady Mayoress) is decorated in Adam style.

=== Third floor ===
- The tea room holds up to 30 people. The large walnut table was originally in the boardroom at Raleigh Industries' headquarters building (also designed by Howitt).
- The members' room has facilities for councillors, including newspapers and journals, computers and a television. An archive of minutes of City Council meetings is available in glass-fronted bookshelves.
- The council chamber takes up the remainder of the third floor. The fixed seating is arranged in a semicircle so no one is more than 26 feet (7.9 m) from the Lord Mayor, above whose dais can be found two Latin inscriptions whose translations read "Laws are made for the welfare of the citizens and the city" and "It is the highest justice to give each man his due". The chamber's walls are of Ancona walnut, with fabric wall panels containing seaweed to aid the acoustics. A separate entrance from the Exchange Arcade (Smithy Row side) gives direct access to the public galleries.
- There are rooms which can be used by councillors (since 2010, most city councillors have been based at Loxley House on Station Street) and the Conservative opposition group on the council has an office outside the Council Chamber.

== Dome ==
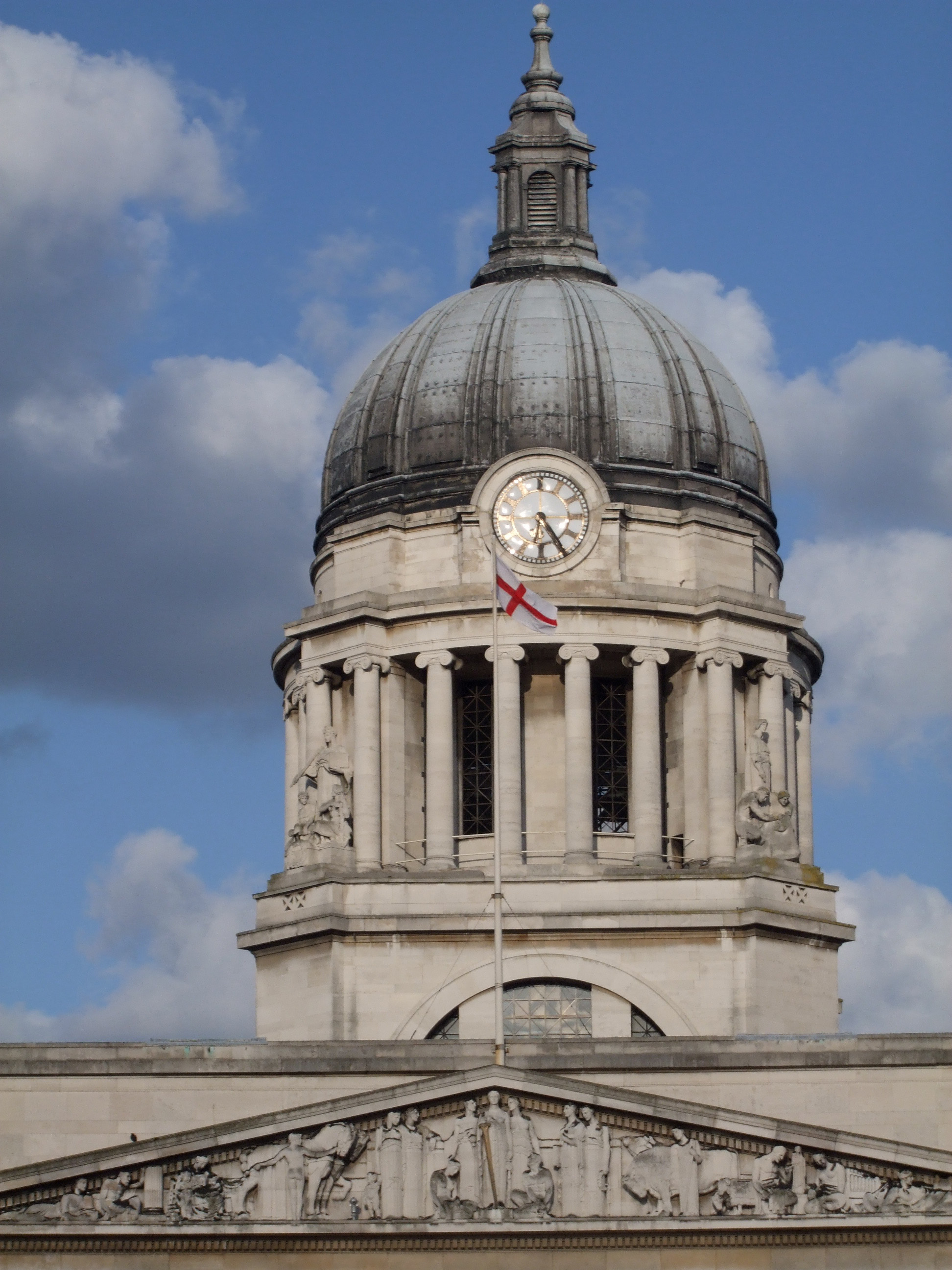
The Council House dome

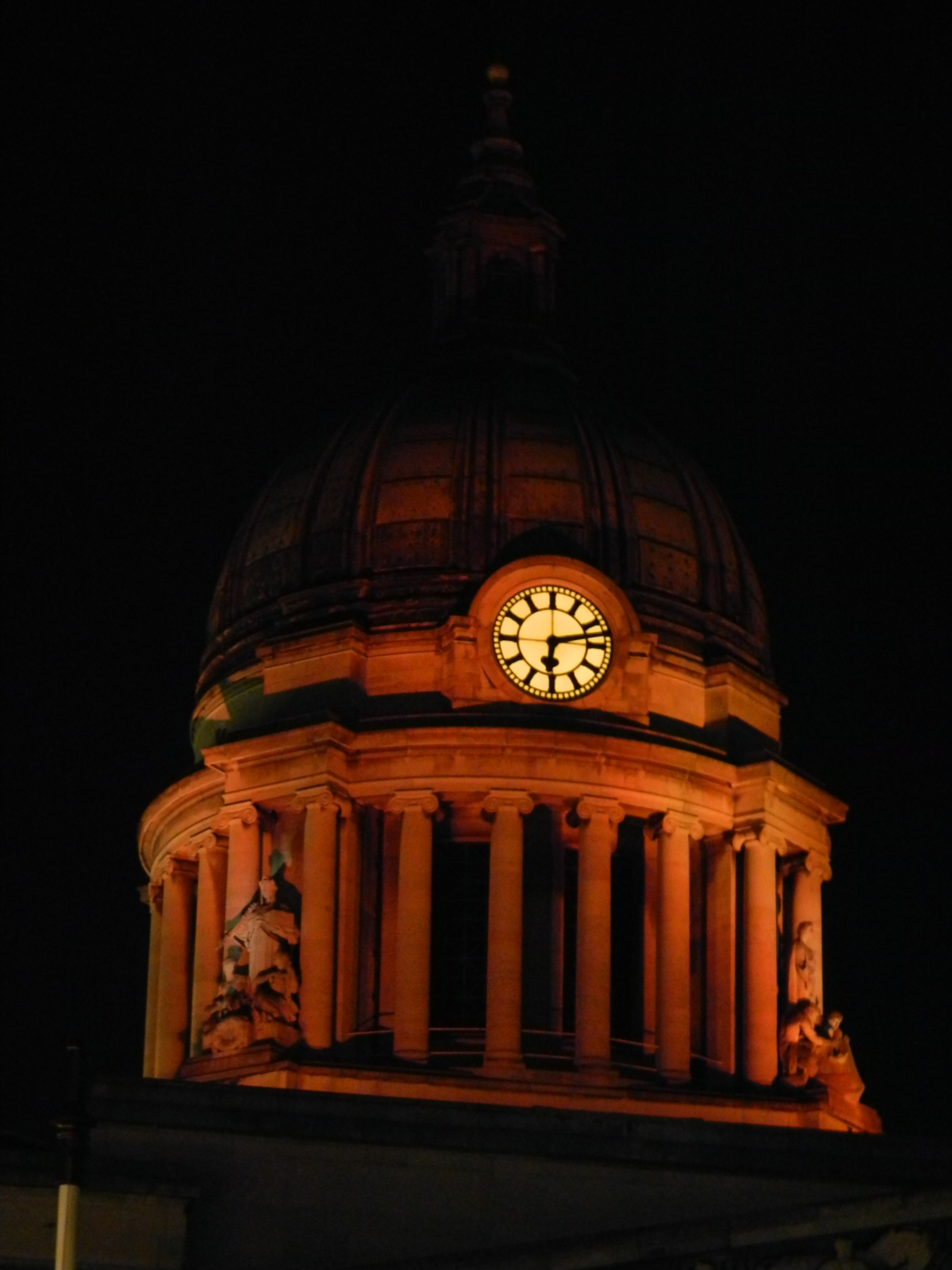
Council House dome during Nottingham Light Night 2012

The most striking visual element of the building, and in itself an iconic symbol of the city, is the dome. An ornate cupola stands on the apex of the dome. The top of the cupola is 200 feet (61 m) above the Old Market Square below.

To the rear of the clock face is the clock mechanism, which was manufactured and installed by William W. Cope of the Cope clockmaking family. The dial is 9 feet (2.7 m) in diameter and sits 150 feet (46 m) above ground level. There is only one dial on the west front of the building. The clock mechanism contains a pendulum 13 feet (4.0 m) long with a period of 4 seconds, and the movement is controlled by a double three-legged gravity escapement. The clock is still wound by hand once per week.

Four bells provide Westminster Chimes on the quarter hours. The hour bell has been named 'Little John' since the building opened. The bell was cast in 1928, by the world-famous bellfounders John Taylor & Co. of Loughborough. At 10 long tons 7 cwt 0 qr 27 lb (23,211 lb or 10.528 t) in weight, 'Little John' is the fourth-heaviest founded by John Taylor & Co. and the sixth-heaviest in the British Isles. The E♭ tone is the deepest, for a non-swinging clock bell in the British Isles. The new chimes and strike were not universally popular and following complaints from members of the public about them ringing throughout the night, the council agreed in July 1929 that the chimes should not strike after 11.00pm until 6.15am, and from September the strike was also suspended at night between 11.00pm and 7.00am.

== The Exchange (Exchange Arcade) ==
The ground floor is predominantly an upmarket fashion-dominated shopping mall – now called 'The Exchange' in honour of the Nottingham Exchange – having had an image makeover in 2005. The original name of Exchange Arcade is still used by many local people however. Retailing space was included in the design to fund the corporation's construction of the building, during the Great Depression and remained under council control until sold in 1985 and redeveloped as a shopping centre.

This part of the building has been in private hands since that time, and is currently owned by a pension fund. Each shop has its own basement showroom or storage facilities, deliveries being made via an underground roadway, served by a vehicular lift on Cheapside. This service area was originally the fresh produce hall, and received natural light via pavement lights in the floor of the arcade above. The locations of those lights can still be seen, marked by the 1985-vintage terracotta tile strips which replaced them, interspersed between the York stone paving slabs. The paved areas were replaced in 2014 with identical York stone.

Painted murals underneath the Council House dome feature:

- The Danes capturing Nottingham in 868:
- William the Conqueror ordering the building of the castle in 1068;
- Robin Hood and his Merry Men;
- King Charles I raising his standard at the start of the Civil War in 1642.

Each mural was the work of local artist Noel Denholm Davis. The artist used local celebrities as models. Thus T. Cecil Howitt himself appears in the guise of William the Conqueror's surveyor, and Notts County F.C. goalkeeper Albert Iremonger as Little John. The inscription around the base of the dome reads: "The Corporation of Nottingham erected this building for counsel and welcome, and to show merchandise and crafts". The condition of these murals has deteriorated in recent years, largely through the ingress of water. The Robin Hood mural was particularly severely damaged in this way. In June 2018 Nottingham City Council finished a complete restoration of the damaged murals in a process which took about three months.

== Statuary ==
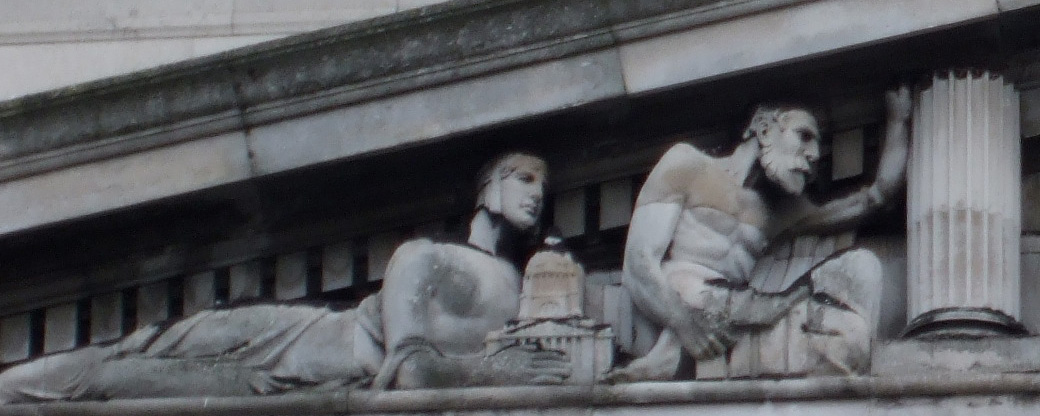
Detail of sculpture on principal facade, showing a model of the Council House

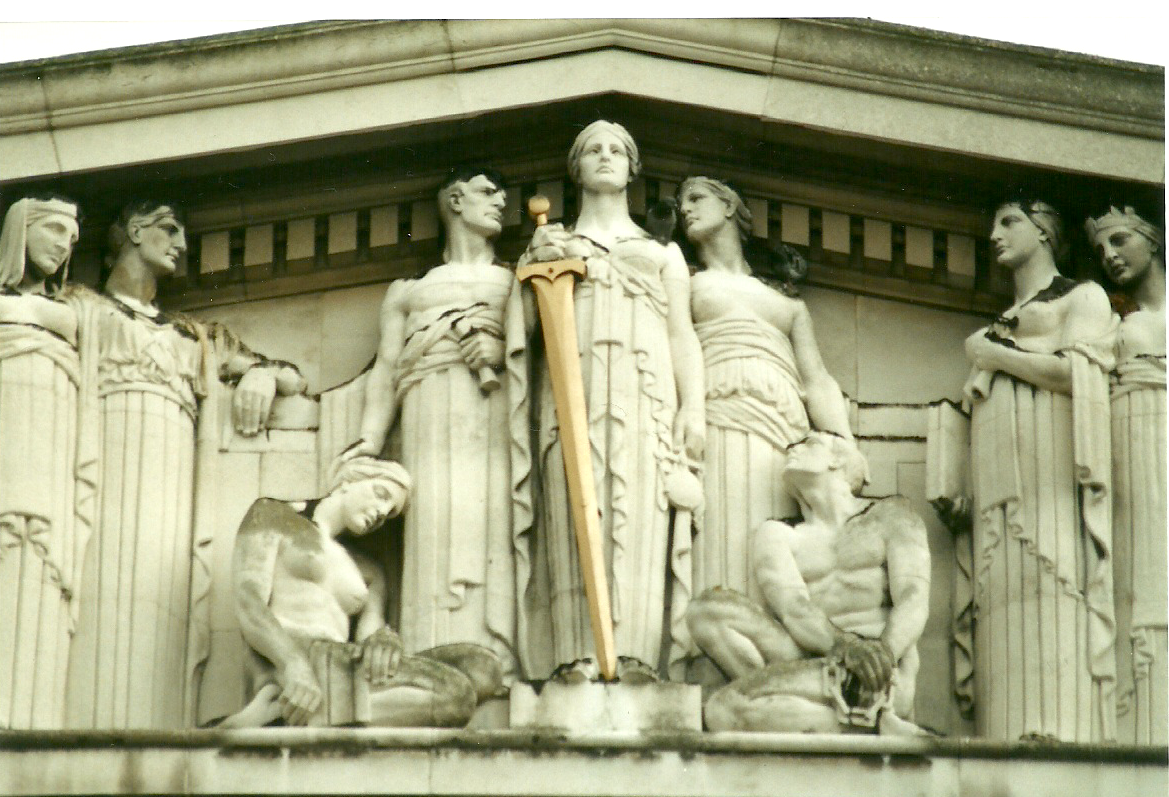
Detail of sculpture on principal facade, showing statue of Justice

Much of the external statuary is by Joseph Else (1875–1955), Principal of the Nottingham School of Art (now part of Nottingham Trent University). Else was responsible for the famous lions guarding the entrance, for the frieze above the Ballroom windows (representing ancient local industries such as bellfounding and alabaster) and for the figures in the principal façade's pediment (depicting the arts and public service). A pub overlooking the Square is now named after Else.

=== The lions ===
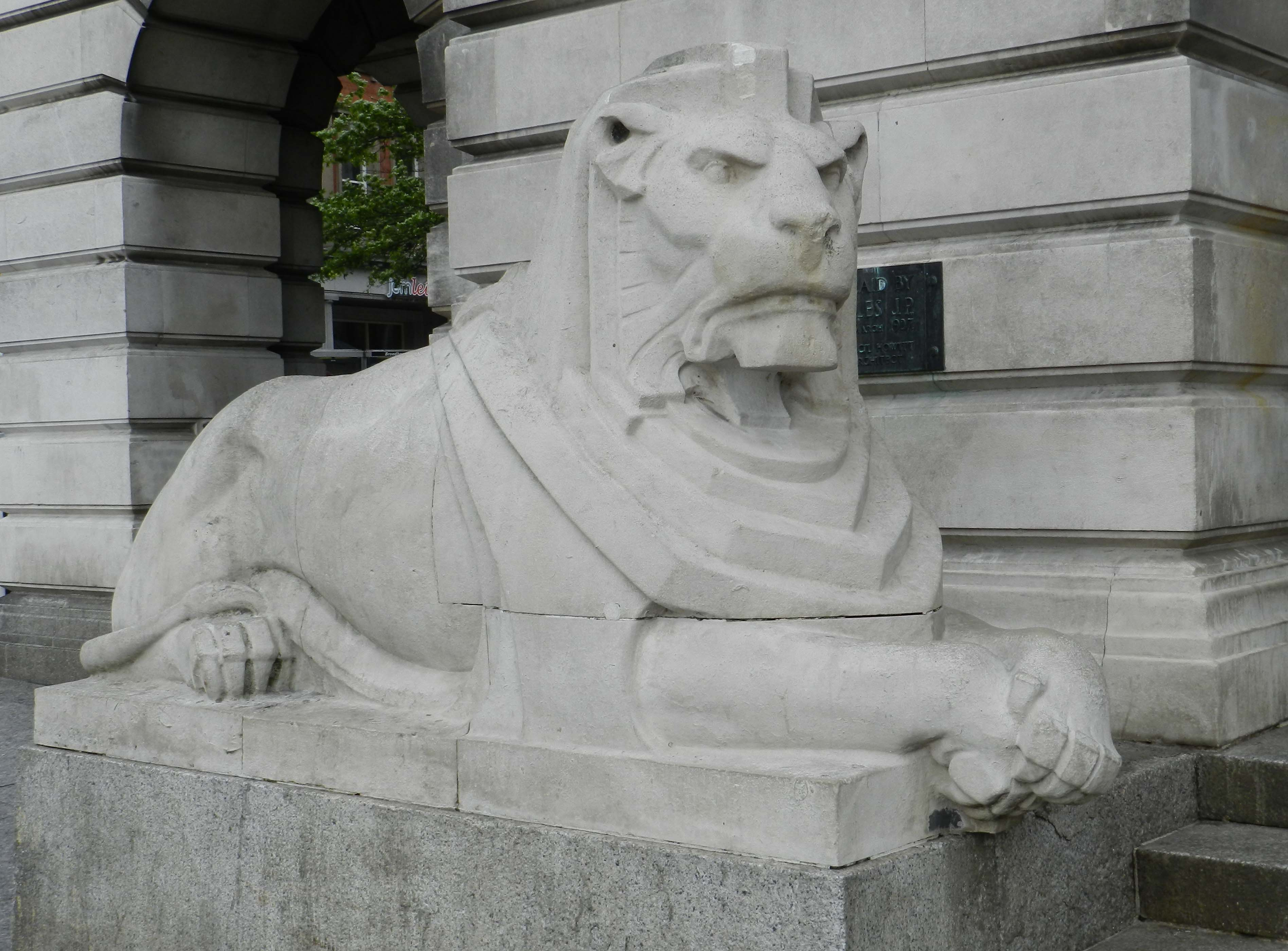
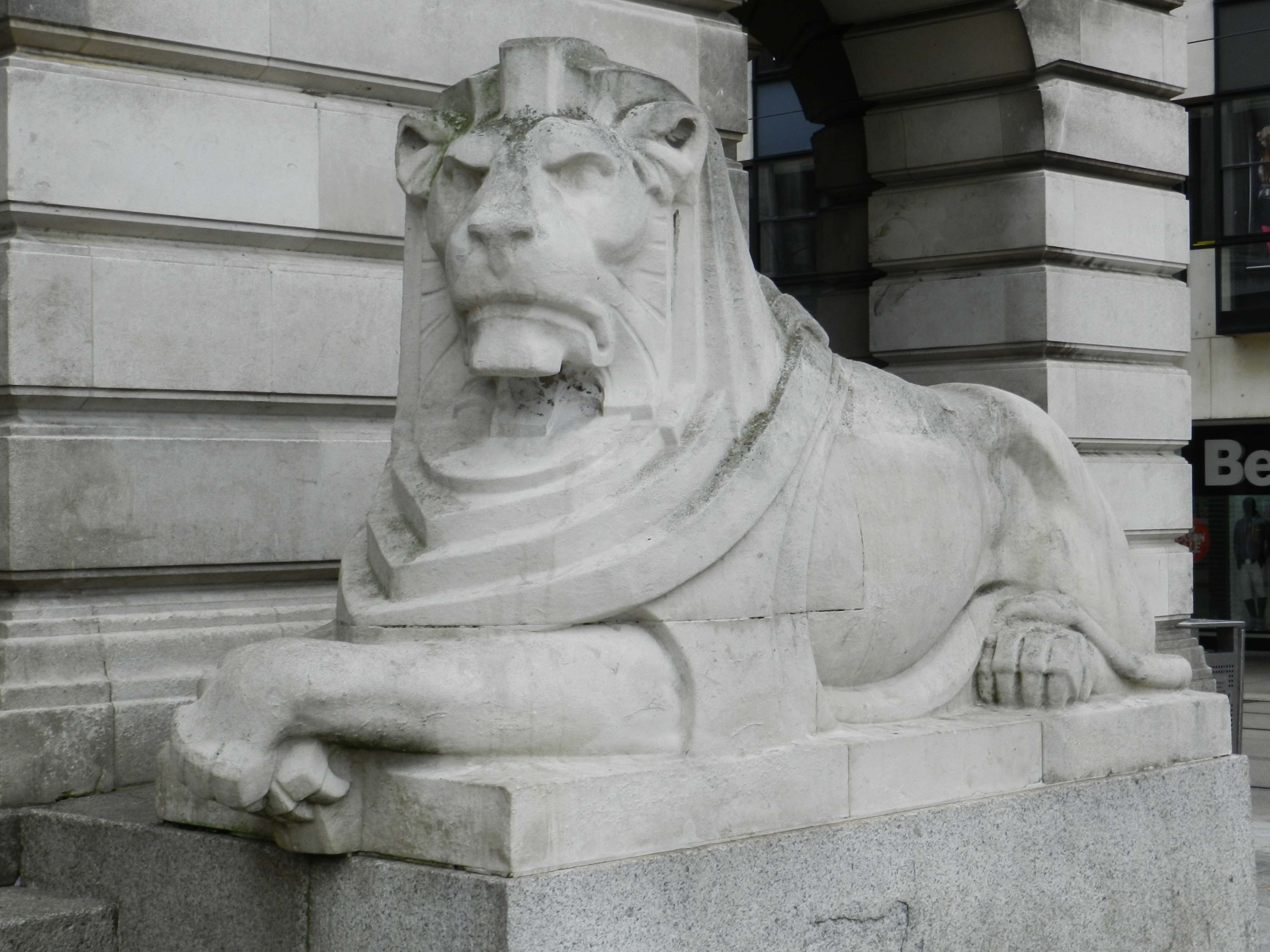
The two lions

Created by Joseph Else, the two art-deco lions each weigh 2 tonnes (2.0 t) and stand guard on either side of the entrance steps. They are similar in design to the lions used to publicise the British Empire Exhibition of 1924/25. Joseph Else named them, 'Agamemnon' and 'Menelaus', after the elder son and younger son of King Atreus of Mycenae, from Greek mythology. Alternative colloquial names are, 'Leo' (Left) and 'Oscar' (Right).

The colloquialism, "Meet you by the lions" (often the left lion), became part of the local dialect from the beginning of their existence, and they are still used as a meeting place today.

=== Sculpture groups around the dome ===
These groups were created by Joseph Else and three former students of the School of Art. All the sculptors were born and raised in Nottingham.

- 'Commerce' by Joseph Else. The two male figures are pushing a ship, carrying a female holding a caduceus. This is at the Exchange Walk (Natwest Bank) corner.
- 'Civic Law' by Charles L J Doman. A smiling central female figure holds a sceptre in her right hand and book in her left. At her feet are the figures of Law (holding a fasces and Justice (carrying a sword). This group is at the Long Row / King Street corner.
- 'Prosperity' by James Woodford. Strikingly Art-Deco, a female holds a sword. At her feet are a mother and baby, and a female holding the fruits of the earth. This group is at the Long Row East corner, (best seen from outside the Yorkshire Bank). Woodford is the most famous of the sculptors outside his native Nottingham, having created the heraldic Queen's Beasts for the 1953 Coronation Pavilion at Westminster Abbey. He also had commissions for the liner RMS Queen Mary, the RIBA building in London, as well as the famous statue of Robin Hood at Nottingham Castle.
- 'Knowledge' by Ernest Webb. A female figure (in striking 1920s hat) holds a globe. The two male figures sit at her feet, one holding a book, the other a pair of compasses.
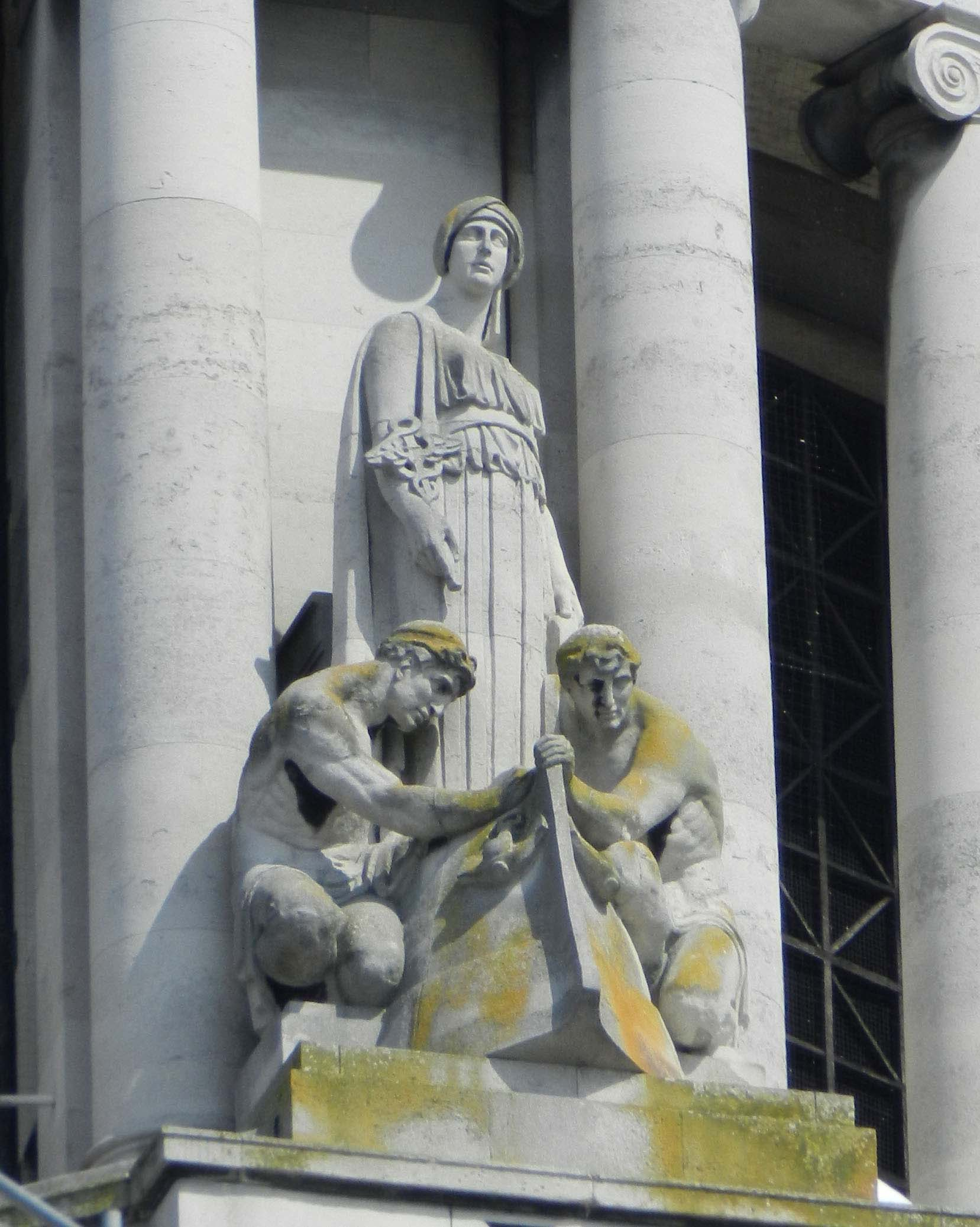
'Commerce' by Joseph Else

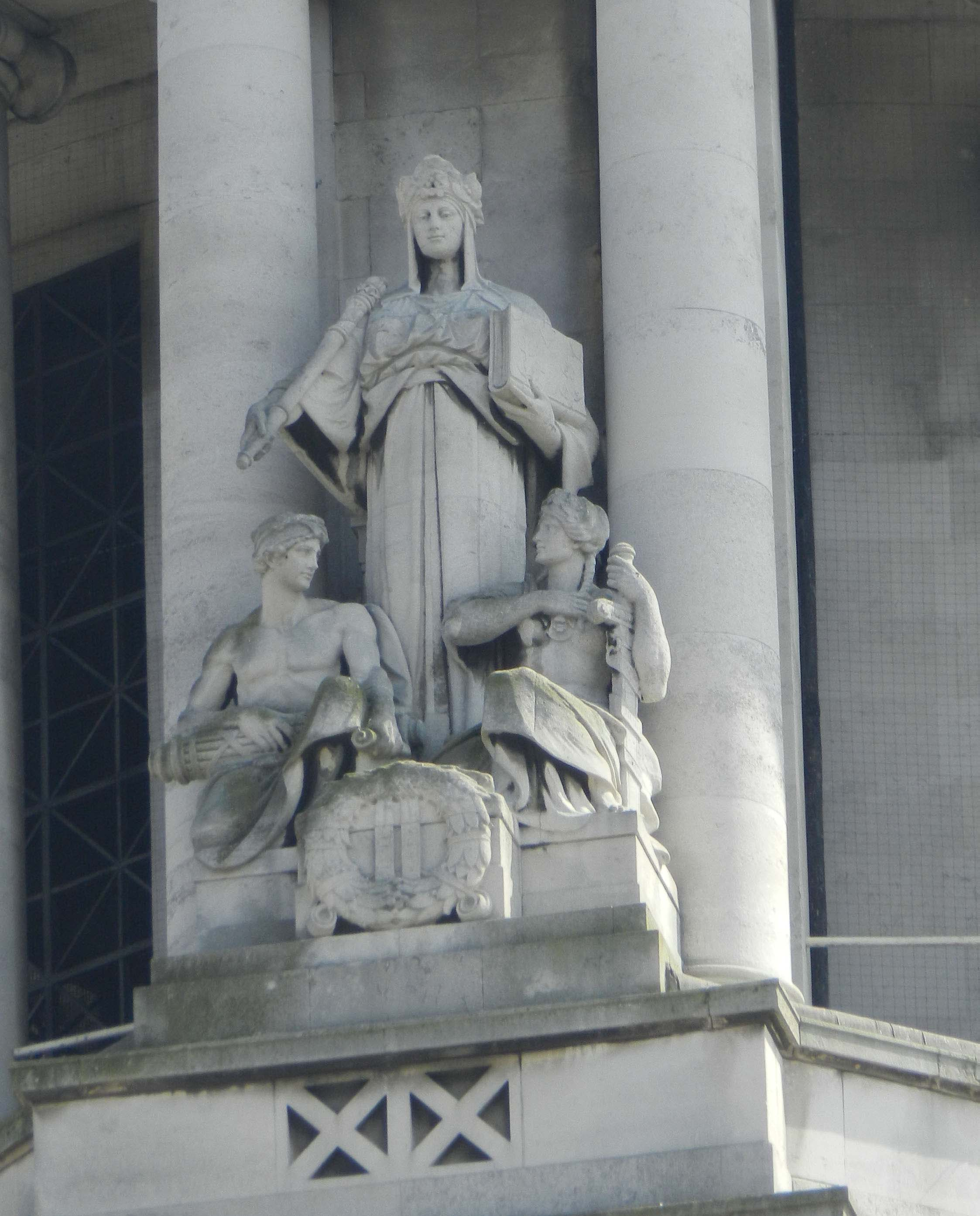
'Civic Law' by Charles LJ Doman

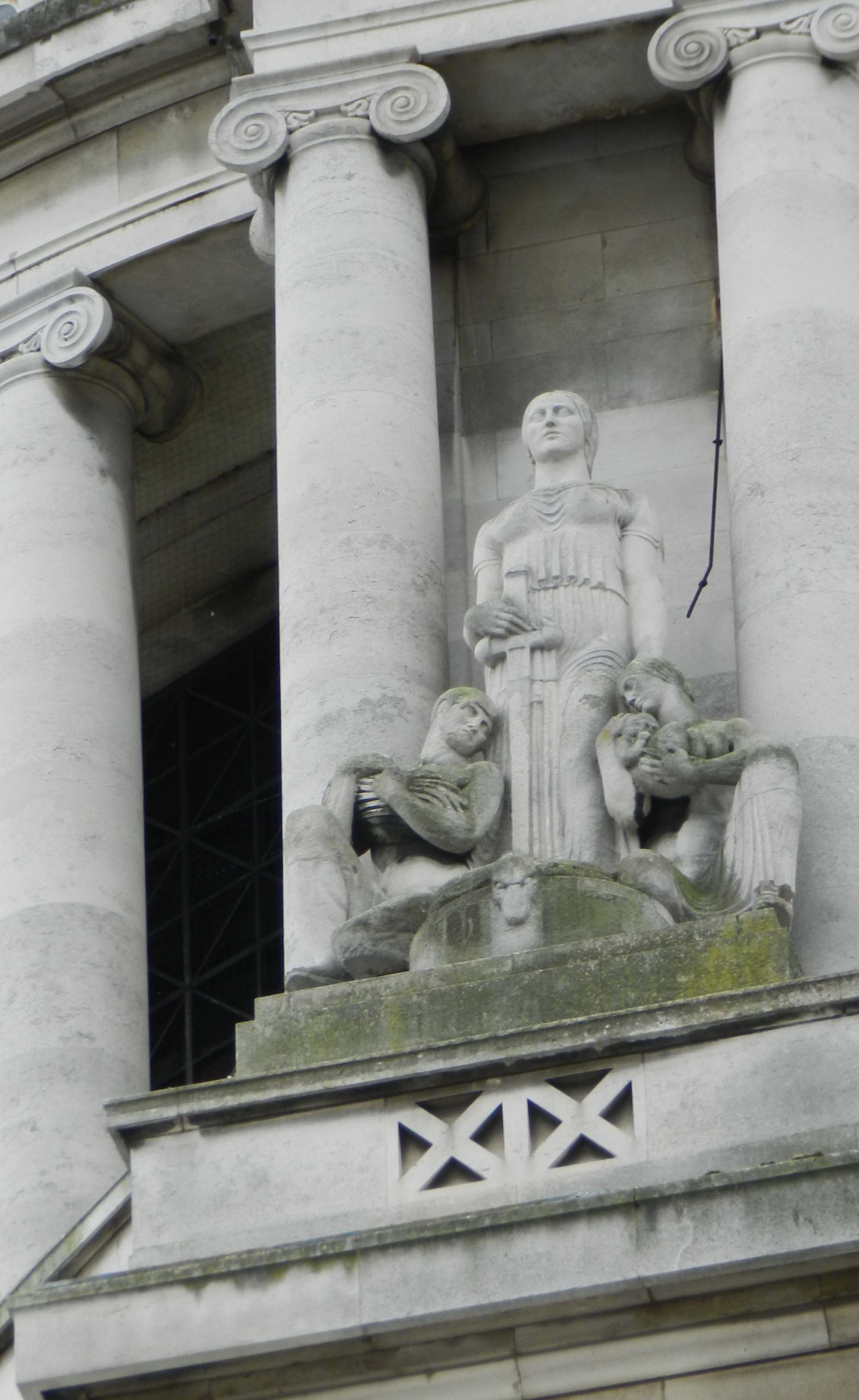
'Prosperity' by James Woodford

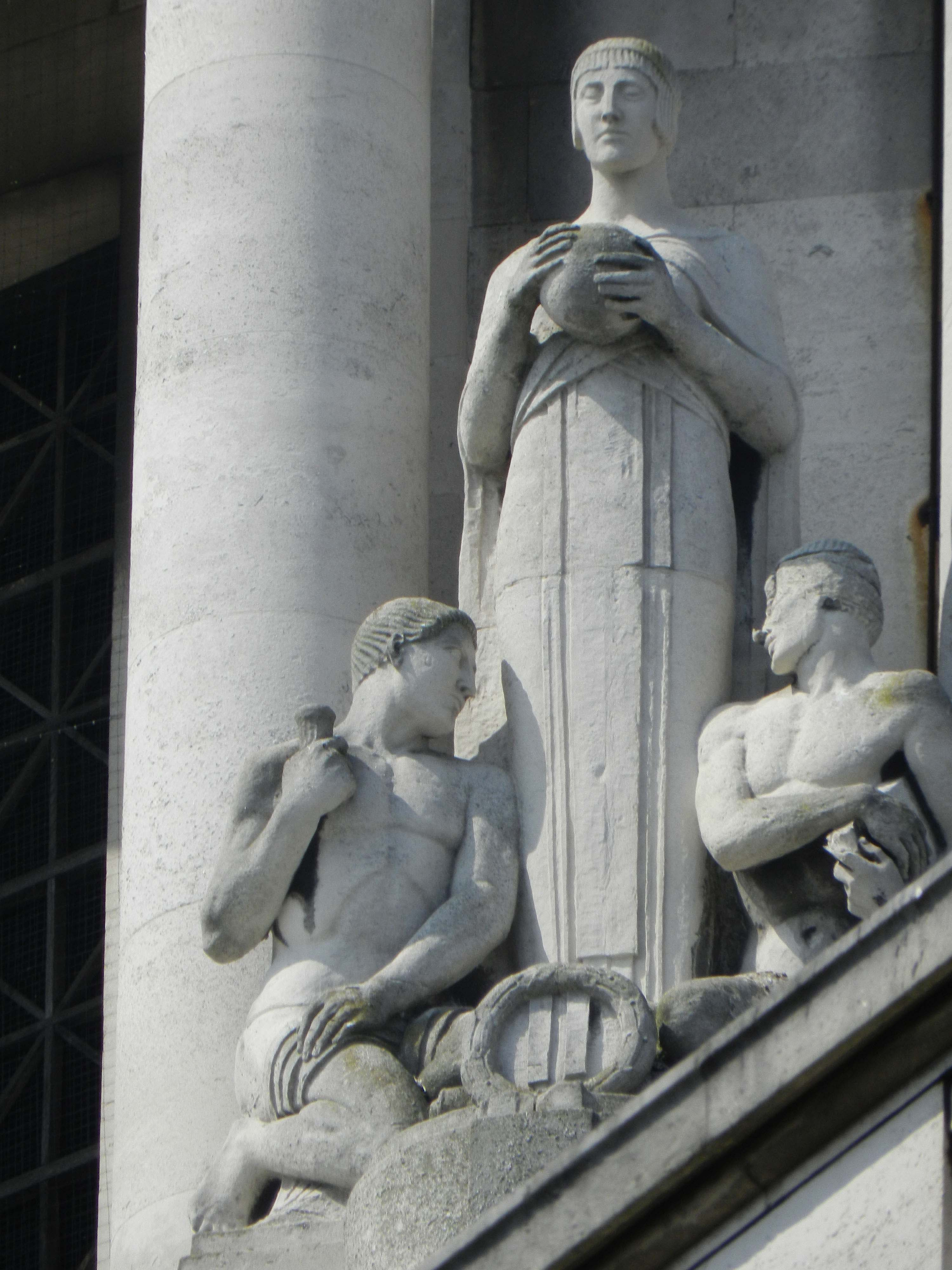
'Knowledge' by Ernest Webb

== Appraisal ==
A scathing criticism came from Nikolaus Pevsner in his Buildings of England: Nottinghamshire (published in 1951);

"Not much can be said in defence of this kind of neo-Baroque display at a date when the Stockholm Town Hall was complete and a style congenial to the C20 established. Wren has to answer for much, once the connection between Greenwich and this dome (via the Old Bailey?) is noted. The Ionic columniation is no more inspiring or truthful than the interiors. The only positive interest lies in the plan of the building. Its centre is a shopping arcade of great height with a glass roof, and shops run all along the ground floor on the N and S sides".

== See also ==
- Grade II* listed buildings in Nottinghamshire
- Listed buildings in Nottingham (Bridge ward)
