= Arthur Lowe (painter) =

English painter

- Born: 1865; Nottingham, Nottinghamshire, England
- Died: 1940 (aged 74–75); Kinoulton, Nottinghamshire, England
- Known for: Painting
- Notable work: Autumn; October
- Movement: Impressionism
- Website: www.arthurlowe.co.uk

Arthur Lowe (1865 – 1940) was a member of the Nottingham Society of Artists, exhibiting there first in 1898, exhibited twice at the Royal Academy (the first time in 1900, exhibiting one work called October, the second time was in 1916 with a work called Autumn), five times at the Royal Birmingham Society of Artists, four times at the Walker Art Gallery, Liverpool, 99 times at Nottingham Castle Museum and Gallery, Nottingham, and twice at the Royal Cambrian Academy. In 1936, aged over 70 years, he held his first London one-man show exhibiting more than 200 works at the New Burlington Galleries, London.

== Early years ==
Lowe was born in Nottingham, England but lived most of his life in Kinoulton in the Vale of Belvoir. He spent practically his whole life in or near Nottingham. He received his early training at the Nottingham School of Art. Later he attended the Slade and St. John's Wood schools after which he returned to his native county where he was to remain amid tranquil and beautiful surroundings for the rest of his life.

== Notable works ==
Lowe's paintings are held in the permanent collections of the Ferens Art Gallery (Hull), Laing Art Gallery (Newcastle), Shipley Art Gallery (Gateshead) and the Sunderland Museum (Sunderland), Bolton Museum (Bolton), Tullie House Museum and Art Gallery (Carlisle), Darlington Art Gallery (Darlington), Graves Art Gallery (Sheffield), South Shields Museum & Art Gallery (County Durham), The Beacon (Whitehaven) and York Art Gallery, (York).

== Death ==
Arthur Lowe died in Kinoulton, 3 February 1940.

A posthumous exhibition was held in 1943 showing over 250 of his paintings at the Laing Art Gallery (Newcastle) before his wife, Mary Lowe, donated and distributed his life's works to various galleries and museums around northern England.
