= Charles Doman =

English sculptor

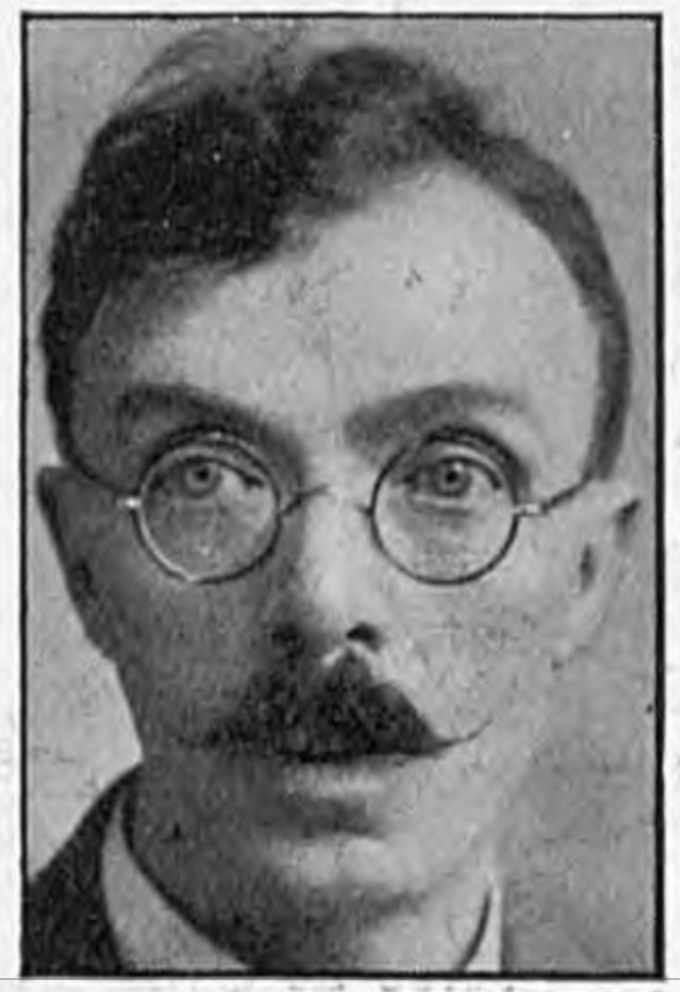
- From The Sphere, 17 November 1928
- Born: Charles Leighfield Jonah Doman; 31 August 1884; St. Ann's, Nottingham, England
- Died: 19 March 1944 (aged 59); Wimbledon, London, England
- Education: Royal College of Art; Nottingham School of Art
- Known for: Sculpture
- Notable work: Sculpture on the Port of London Authority Building
- Spouse: Selina Maud Alton

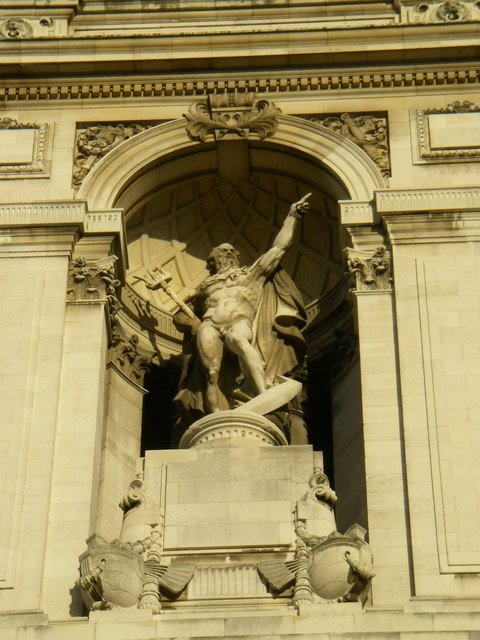
Statue of Father Thames on the Port of London Authority Building

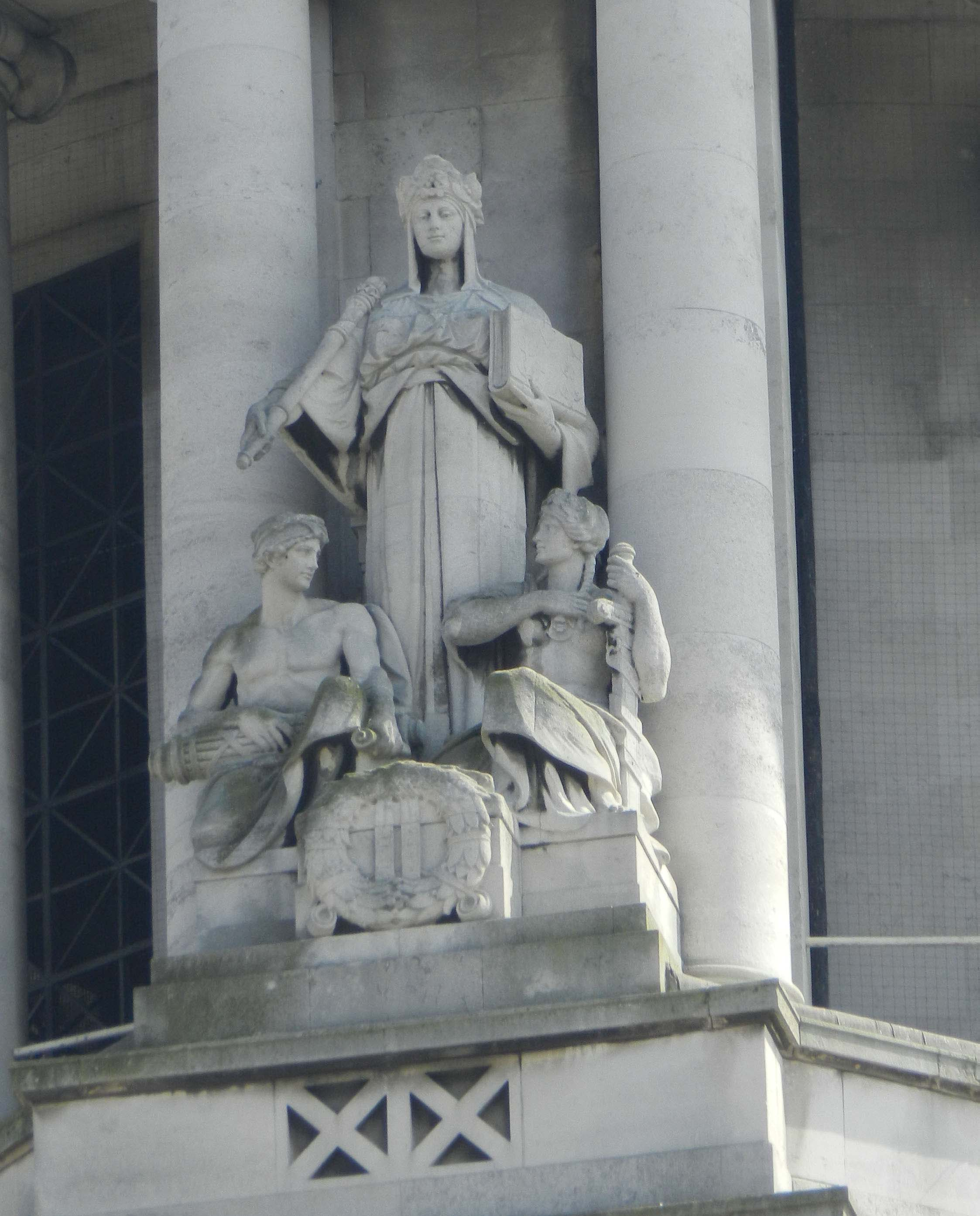
Civic Law on Nottingham Council House

Charles Leighfield Jonah Doman FRBS (31 August 1884 – 19 March 1944) was a sculptor from Nottingham.

== Career ==
Born in 1884, he was the son of George L. Doman, a stone carver and monumental mason. He trained at the Nottingham School of Art from 1897 to 1901, where he was a pupil of Joseph Else. Then he worked for his father and studied at the Royal College of Art in South Kensington, London from 1905 to 1908.

He married Selina Maud Alton in 1908 in Nottingham.

Sculpture which is visible in public buildings includes the Bust of Lord Trent at Highfields Park, Nottingham, Civic Law at Nottingham Council House, and The Port of London Authority building, erected in 1928.

He taught sculpture at the Putney School of Art. In 1923 he became an associate member of the Royal Society of British Sculptors and 1938 he was elected a Fellow.

Doman designed the Allied Subjects' Medal which was issued in 1922. This medal design was produced for a War Office competition of 1921. He also designed the 1928 Armistice medal (marking 10 years since the end of the First World War) which was issued by the Royal Mint.

He died on 19 March 1944 in the southwest London suburb of Wimbledon (then in the county of Surrey) and left an estate valued at £2,892 1s 7d. (equivalent to £146,200 in 2024).

== Works ==
- Sculpture of Truth, Nottingham Castle Museum, 1904
- Sculpture, Port of London Authority Building, London, 1922
- Sculpture, Lloyds, Leadenhall Street, London 1925
- Sculpted relief, Liberty's, 208-222 Regent Street, London, 1925-28
- Sculpted relief Charity, Royal Academy of Arts, 1929
- Sculpture of Civic Law, Nottingham Council House, 1929
- Sculptural group Boy and Pelican, Royal Academy of Arts, 1929
- Reliefs, Raleigh Bicycle Company headquarters on Lenton Boulevard, Nottingham. 1931
- Relief Panel, Half Landing, Administrative Block, Royal Masonic Hospital, Ravenscourt Park, London, 1933
- Bust of Jesse Boot, 1st Baron Trent, Highfields Park, University of Nottingham, 1934
- Reliefs, Home Ales brewery building, Daybrook, Nottingham, 1936
- Sculpted panel of Solicitude, exhibited at the Royal Academy of Arts, 1937
- Bust of Dick Sheppard, 1938
