= John Richard Townsend =

English painter

John Richard Townsend FRSA (1930 – 2013) was a painter who was born in Nottingham. His father was Art Director at Thomas Forman & Sons printers. Townsend left school aged 14 and studied art at Nottingham School of Art. He was taught by the Nottinghamshire painter Arthur Spooner. During the 1950s and 1960s, Townsend was commissioned internationally for oil painting portraits of celebrities and members of the aristocracy.

Townsend's portrait of Queen Elizabeth II

In 1970 Townsend was commissioned by Nottingham businessman Lewis Henry Colton to paint a portrait of Queen Elizabeth II. The portrait was presented as a gift to the city by Lew Colton. It hangs in the dining room of Nottingham Council House.

Townsend exhibited through the Royal Academy in London. Princess Anne and the Duchess of Kent have both bought works by Townsend.

In 2007 Townsend painted a portrait of Notts County football manager Jimmy Sirrel, which is owned by the football club.
