= Arthur Henry Knighton-Hammond =

English watercolour painter

Arthur Henry Knighton-Hammond (18 September 1875 – 28 February 1970) was born in Arnold, Nottinghamshire as Arthur Henry Hammond. Knighton-Hammond was an English artist best known for landscapes, society portraits and industrial paintings. Knighton-Hammond used a variety of styles but is most famous as a water-colourist.

== Early life ==
Hammond was born at Church Street, Arnold, Nottingham, the son of William Hammond (1829-1901), who ran a furniture and general hardware shop, and Mary (1833-1906), née Knighton. He adopted his mother's maiden surname as a middle name in 1912, then added it to his surname by deed poll in 1933. Hammond spent his early years in Arnold and Nottingham. Hammond left school aged 11 and worked in his brother's grocery store before indenturing as a watchmaker's apprentice one year later. Hammond studied at the Nottingham School of Art in the evenings and left his apprenticeship after 4½ years, six months short of completing his apprenticeship, to study full-time.

In 1902, he married Winifred Annie Reeves; they had two children, Marjorie and Dorothy. In 1927, he married Emmeline Low; they had two children, Mary and John. In 1933 in the City of London, he married Mrs Iris Benson, whom he had known since 1924.

== Career ==
Knighton-Hammond was commissioned by the Dow Chemical Company in 1920–1921 to produce paintings and lived in Midland, Michigan. He lived in Europe from 1922–1931. He lived in England from 1932–1970. Knighton-Hammond was elected a member of the Royal Institute of Painters in Water Colours, The Pastel Society, the Royal Institute of Oil Painters, and Royal Scottish Society of Painters in Watercolour.

== Public galleries ==
Knighton-Hammond's work is on display at the National Portrait Gallery, London, the South African National Gallery, the National Museum of Belgrade, and the Centre Georges-Pompidou, Paris.

== Biography ==
- Peter Norris, Arthur Henry Knighton-Hammond (1994) ISBN 0-7188-2824-0
