= Tim Stead =

British sculptor and furniture maker

Tim Stead MBE (March 1952 – 21 April 2000) was a British sculptor and furniture maker who worked primarily in wood.

== Early life and education ==
Tim Stead was born in 1952 and brought up near Helsby one of four brothers, in rural Cheshire. He was educated at Heronwater Prep School [now Coed Coch] and The Leys School, Cambridge. He attended art-school at Nottingham Trent University, School of Art and Design and undertook a post-diploma course at Glasgow School of Art.

After living in Glasgow for a period, he moved to Harestanes in the Scottish Borders and then to Blainslie near Lauder which was his home until his death in April 2000. Stead's house The Steading was also home to his wife, Maggy, and their children Sam and Emma.

== Work ==
=== Sculpture ===
Stead was a sculptor before he was a furniture maker.

Sculpturally, Stead's work did not appear to derive from any particular art historical tradition although the ideas of Brancusi, Beuys and Hundertwasser, amongst others, were central to his vision. Early on, he rejected Conceptualism, particularly in the way it was practiced at Trent Polytechnic in Nottingham, where he completed the early part of his training. An early work, 'Burnt Tower with Creaking Pendulum’ contains most of his essential vocabulary, later expanded and refined. The piece shows items of worn driftwood bound together with rope, spectacularly off centre and asymmetrical.

=== Furniture ===
Stead's work as a furniture maker could not be separated from his ideas as a sculptor. His furniture owed something to Art Nouveau, in particular Charles Rennie Mackintosh, Majorelle and Victor Horta; his training at Glasgow School of Art was influential in this respect.

In his post-graduate year at Glasgow School of Art and in the year following, Stead's early use of abandoned and found materials developed into the use of hardwoods, some imported. Stead later committed to using only native timbers, notably burred elm and other 'imperfect' wood previously considered unfit for anything other than firewood, though now become highly desirable. He was attracted by thrift and by the heightened singularity of these timbers and the challenge of making virtues of their apparent unsuitability for furniture. Stead had begun exploiting the waney edge of the timber before learning of the work of George Nakashima who wrote The Soul of a Tree, a book highly respected by Stead as expressing much of his own feelings and beliefs.

=== Poetry ===
The first volume of his poems (Towers published posthumously in 2000 ) – all written between 1998 and 1999– deal in part with Stead's chosen sculptural medium:wood.

A second volume of poems light & dark was published in 2002.

== Notable Commissions ==
=== Cafe Gandolfi ===
At Glasgow School of Art while studying for his post-graduate diploma, Stead met lain Mackenzie who was then working in the photography department. After leasing the derelict Old Cheesemarket offices in the then run-down Merchant City area. Mackenzie asked Stead to build and install all the components necessary for a complete refurbishment – chairs, tables, an eight-seater bench and a bar. Deriving its name from the famous Gandolfi Brothers cameras, the café opened in 1979.

=== Papal Throne ===
His most famous commission is the Papal Chair he made for the visit of John Paul II to Scotland in 1982. The Pope celebrated mass at Murrayfield Stadium in July and Stead's chair was the centrepiece at the ceremony. It was commissioned privately by the Polish priest Ryszard Haluka. The commission required the representation on the chair of the four gospels of the New Testament -Matthew, Mark, Luke and John- by their respective symbols: the lion, the angel, the eagle and the bull. The chair, made from elm, was inlaid in a form of marquetry with various other woods.

=== St. John's Chapel, The Kirk of St. Nicholas, Aberdeen ===
In 1989 Stead was commissioned by the North Sea Oil Industries to design and make the fittings for a new Memorial Chapel in the Kirk of St Nicholas, Aberdeen. This originally involved forty chairs, a lectern, communion table and a minister's chair. Later this extended to include a screen which would divide the chapel form the rest of the kirk. The communion table, made in ash and walnut has a slightly ovoid shape representing the bow of a ship and a plough, and has inlays related to Christian symbols such as the fish and the cross. For the chairs Stead used ash and sycamore for the frames and a whole series of woods- walnut, rowan, maple, beech and yew- for a series of slats at the back of the chairs which spell out (if you know what the woods are and write down the initial letters of their names) 'We Remember Yew'.

=== The Millenium Clock ===
Towards the end of the twentieth century, Tim and a group of artists and makers: Eduard Bersudsky (of Sharmanka Kinetic Gallery), Annica Sandström and Jurgen Tübbecke made a proposal to the National Museum of Scotland to make a marker and memorial for the year 2000, a great Millenium Clock.

== Exhibitions ==
=== Layers ===
The work in the touring exhibition 'Layers' represented a fundamental departure for Stead in a number of respects. This was the first exhibition composed exclusively of non-functional, sculptural pieces- and in a gallery setting. 'Layers' was first shown at the Compass Gallery, Glasgow in 1990.

All the 'Layers' pieces carried an invitation – 'Please Touch'.

=== Scotland Creates ===
In 1990 Stead exhibited at the McLellan Galleries' 'Scotland Creates' exhibition which celebrated 5.000 years of art and design in Scotland. The organisers, Barbara and Murray Grigor, invited Stead to re-create one of the houses in the Neolithic Orkney village of Skara Brae, in the main service-lift shaft in the gallery. Stead's Skara Brae was more of an interpretation of the original than a replica. It consisted of thousands of stone-shaped blocks of split wood – mainly elm.

To accompany the Skara Brae exhibit, Stead made a variety of artefacts derived from actual Neolithic archaeological finds. While the purpose of many of these artefacts remains obscure, one important aspect was undoubtedly their tactile quality. The touching and handling of his work was always something Stead was keen to encourage.

=== The Botanic Ash and Explorations in Wood ===
In 1992 the Royal Botanic Garden Edinburgh gave Stead a 50-meter high, nearly two centuries old ash tree to 'explore'. He took this as an opportunity to reveal and display the inner life of this great tree. The resulting work The Botanic Ash was exhibited the following year in The Caledonian Hall alongside Explorations in Wood- an exhibition of sculpture and furniture in Inverleith House both at the Royal Botanic Garden Edinburgh.

== The Steading ==
Stead filled his own home, The Steading, near Lauder, with hand-made furniture and fittings which he crafted from locally sourced native hardwood. These include a timber fireplace, a four-poster bed, a cradle, toilet seats and light switches. According to Nichola Fletcher, who chairs the Tim Stead Trust, the house's interior rivals that of Charles Rennie Mackintosh's Willow Tearooms. The trust was formed in 2015 to raise money to buy the house from Stead's widow. The purchase was completed in 2021 and the house is now open to the public for guided tours.

Since 2020 the house, along with an adjacent sawmill and workshop, has been protected by Historic Environment Scotland as a Category A listed building.
