= Nottingham School of Art and Design =

Art school at Nottingham Trent University

Coordinates: 52.9593°N 1.1565°W

Founded in 1843, the School of Art & Design at Nottingham Trent University is one of the oldest in the United Kingdom.

== History ==
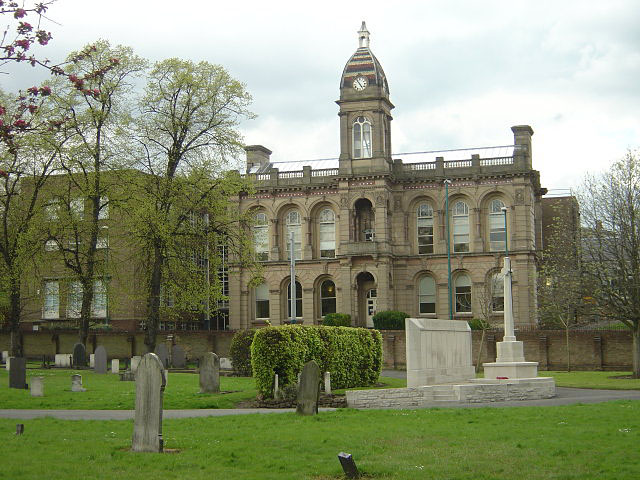
Nottingham School of Art on Waverley Street

In 1836, the Government Select Committee on Art and Manufactures produced a report highlighting concerns about the standard of design in the industry. Higher standards abroad forced manufacturers to buy or copy foreign designs. Later in 1836, the Board of Trade established the ‘Government School of Design’ in London, where, in 1837, it opened at Somerset House.

In order to encourage Practical Art in other populous areas of the UK, a ‘Government School of Design’ was then established in each of several provincial towns, where manufacturing industries were already in existence. Inevitably, the original title was adjusted to include the name of the town where it was located – whilst locally, being simply referred to as, the ‘School of Design’.

- Somerset House in London in 1837, later the Royal College of Art, from 1896
- Manchester, in 1838
- York, in 1842
- Nottingham, in 1843
- Sheffield, in 1843 (September)
- Birmingham, in 1843 (September)
- Coventry, in 1843
- Glasgow, in 1845
- Norwich, in 1845

=== Historical Locations ===
The ‘School of Design’ opened on the 1 April 1843, at the People's Hall in Beck Lane (now Heathcote Street), moving to Plumptre House in Stoney Street in 1852, and to Commerce Square, off High Pavement, in 1858. In 1863, a site was purchased in Waverley Street for the construction of a building specifically for the school.

Building work started on 23 May 1863 but the foundation stone wasn't laid until 22 October that year when Henry Pelham-Clinton, 5th Duke of Newcastle was available for the ceremony. The school was opened by Henry Pelham-Clinton, 6th Duke of Newcastle on 19 June 1865. The architect was Frederick Bakewell. In front of the building is a statue of the artist Richard Parkes Bonington, produced by Watson Fothergill.

== Current status ==
=== Location ===
Nottingham Trent University's City site is based close to Nottingham city centre.

The School of Art and Design is based at the university's City site, about half a mile from the city centre.

=== Art and design facilities ===
All of NTU's art and design courses are based at three buildings on the university's City site.

Bonington building — a labyrinthine three-story building.

Opened in 1969 by the Duchess of Kent, and upgraded in 2005. Included in the design, at the heart of the building, is a high-ceilinged exhibition space, known as 'Bonington Gallery'. It is one of the oldest art galleries in Nottingham. Bonington was officially re-opened in May 2006 by Sir Paul Smith.

- Modern art and design studios, workshops, ceramics and glass kilns
- Photographic studios
- Fashion studios, electronic garment and knitwear technology
- Digital textile printing, digital loom and embroidery equipment
- Laser cutting technology
- Computer suites, CAD systems, image and sound editing studios
- Exhibition galleries
- Art and design shop
- Café and social spaces

Waverley building — a restored, listed building with design heritage.

The Waverley building houses the Nottingham School of Art and Design since 1865. As part of the NTU's buildings regeneration plan, and in recognition of its importance and provenance, the university arranged for constructional adjustments and refurbishment to upgrade all the facilities, including an exhibition space, disabled access and an improved environment for both staff and students. The upgrade being completed in the year 2000 at a cost of £1.4M

- Gallery and exhibition foyer
- Working studio theatre
- Design workshops and studios
- Wardrobe department including dye and production facilities
- Audio and video suites with editing facilities
- Integrated Windows and Mac IT suites

Maudslay building — a centre for industry and technology.

During 2006, the Maudslay building was upgraded to incorporate design facilities and studios.

- Product and furniture workshops: wood synthetics and metal fabrication facilities
- Design studios and working display areas
- IT learning unit, with computer-aided design (CAD) suite
- 'Rapid prototyping' modellers: machines creating a 3D solid object from a virtual computer model
- Waterjet cutter: latest generation technology to cut and shape solid materials, such as glass, steel, granite and marble using a precision waterjet that travels at twice the speed of sound
- CNC (computer-numerical control) router and brand new laser cutter
- Location of designated placement office support unit for all courses
- The Hive was designed for NTU staff, students and graduates, but was open to anyone with an idea they wanted to develop. During 2021 these facilities were transferred to the Dryden Enterprise Centre

=== Courses ===
Courses are offered at undergraduate levels (BA Hons in numerous disciplines) and also MAs in a wide range of subjects.

There is an MA by 'Registered Project or thesis', offered as a flexible postgraduate course, allowing students to tailor their course specifically around their areas of individual interest. There are a variety of Part-time, Art and Design MA courses beginning in 2026 and 2027.

=== Industrial links ===
In the field of art and design, NTU has links with a wide range of companies, professional bodies and institutions on an international level, including Apple, Arcadia Group, Boots (company), Broadway, Fashion Institute of Technology, Association of Illustrators, Marks & Spencer, Sony, and Sophie Steller.

=== International students ===
The university has international liaison staff, course tutors and trained counsellors to give international students advice and practical help, and also offers a detailed orientation programme the week before term begins. University representatives regularly travel to international education fairs to give advice and information to overseas applicants.

=== International exchanges ===
NTU has links across Europe, the United States, Japan, Korea, China, Australia, India, Africa, and the Far East, both through individual contacts and exchange programmes.

Many of NTU's undergraduate courses offer the opportunity to spend time studying at a university overseas. Students can do this in Europe through the Erasmus Programme, previously known as the Socrates programme from 1994 until 1999, and then Socrates II from 2000 until 2006. For countries worldwide, there is the university's study abroad scheme.

== The NFFC Badge ==
In early 1973, R. Lyon, the deputy director of Trent Polytechnic, and W. Payne, the Associate Head of the Graphics Department of the College of Art, were approached by the Nottingham Forest Football Club, for advice regarding the design of a new badge. The Nottingham Evening Post Sports Editor was then consulted, resulting in a competition being organised, which was announced in March 1973. There were 855 entries, some from other countries. (587 in the adult section and 268 in the junior section.)

The winning design was by Trent Polytechnic graphic designer and lecturer, David Lewis. To maintain anonymity, Lewis entered his design using his mother's maiden name. The reason being, that one of the five judges was W. Payne, his head of department at Trent Polytechnic. After winning the competition, Lewis adapted his entry to produce the final design. His explanation, describing the new badge, is reproduced below, as printed on page eleven in the Forest Programme of Saturday 8 September 1973:

' The main visual elements in the final design: Equal thickness of heavy line treatment gives a ″completeness″ (fairly weighty appearance is much more likely to identify with supporters than a spindly one). The straight and relatively short tree trunk gives strength and prevents the tree top and the water becoming too separate. The tree achieves a unique quality through its shape — the triangular shape adds stability. The small ″E″ in ″Forest″ helps give a personal identity to the name — it becomes something more unique than just the word.

David Lewis — Designer/Lecturer in Graphic Design, Trent Polytechnic. '

== Notable alumni ==
- Rayner Hoff – Public sculptor who rose to prominence in Australia.
- Dame Laura Knight – First female artist to be made a Dame of the British Empire
- Stuart Trevor – Scottish-born fashion designer who founded the retail group AllSaints.
- John Bowley – British architect and engineer.
- Graham Ibbeson – British artist and sculptor, known for the realistic figurative sculptures he has created for public commissions in the United Kingdom.
- Lawrence Bright – British architect.
- Hedley John Price – English architect based in Nottingham.
- John Frederick Dodd – British architect based in Derbyshire.
- Gilbert Smith Doughty – British architect based in Nottingham and Matlock.
- Noel Denholm Davis – English artist, who worked chiefly as a portrait painter.
- Charles Doman – British sculptor based in Nottingham.
- Arthur Lowe – British painter and member of the Nottingham Society of Artists.
- Joseph Else – British sculptor based in Nottingham and associate member of the Royal Society of British Sculptors.
- Sheila Robinson – British artist and illustrator, one of the Great Bardfield Artists and member of staff at the Royal College of Art.
- Andreas Schmidt – German artist
- Tom Sandberg – Norwegian art photographer.
- Richard Evans – British graphic designer and author.
- Mary Gillick – British sculptor and medallist, best known for her effigy of Elizabeth II used on coinage in the United Kingdom and elsewhere from 1953 to 1970.
- John Howitt – British architect based in Nottingham.
- Sidney Roberts Stevenson – English architect based in Nottingham.
- Joseph Warburton – English architect based in Nottinghamshire.
- Charles Nelson Holloway – British architect based in Nottingham.
- James Woodford – English sculptor most famous for the statue of Robin Hood outside Nottingham Castle.
- Dudley D. Watkins – Creator of Lord Snooty and Desperate Dan for the Beano and Dandy comics.
- Harold Knight – English portrait, genre and landscape painter.
- Jonathan Huxley – Artist
- Ellie Harrison – British artist.
- Tim Noble and Sue Webster – British artists who are associated with the post-YBA generation of artists.
- Rob Ryan – British visual artist who specialises in Papercutting and screen-printing.
- Samson Kambalu – Malawi-born artist, academic, and author. He is a Fellow of Magdalen College, Oxford.
- Scout Niblett – English singer, songwriter, and multi-instrumentalist.
- Lala Meredith-Vula – English and Albanian-Kosovian artist and photographer.
- Stephen Jones – English novelist and lo-fi musician.
- Mamoru Iriguchi – Japanese multimedia artist and theatre designer.
- Peter Liddle – British landscape artist and sculptor, known for his allegorical depictions of the British Isles.
- Stewart Brown – English poet, university lecturer and scholar of African and Caribbean Literature
- Arthur Henry Knighton-Hammond – Artist
- Adrian Searle – chief art critic of The Guardian newspaper in Britain, and has been writing for the paper since 1996. Previously he was a painter.
- Graham Budgett – Artist and educator
- Shane Cullinan – composer
- Richard Evans – Graphic designer of album covers and music-related design
- James Robert Ford – Contemporary conceptual artist.
- Felix Ibru – Nigerian architect
- John Richard Townsend – English painter and fellow of the Royal Society of Arts.
- Samson Kambalu – Malawi-born artist, academic and author who trained as a fine artist and ethnomusicologist at the University of Malawi's Chancellor College.
- David Tress – Anglo-Welsh Artist
- Dai Roberts – British sculptor, print and installation artist
- Said Adrus – Ugandan-British artist.
- Jenny Tiramani – British costume, stage and production designer.
- Keith Piper – British artist, curator, critic and academic
- Donald Rodney – Artist
- Tim Stead – British sculptor and furniture maker who worked primarily in wood.
- Keith Albarn – English artist
- Nick Waplington – British-American artist and photographer. He has critically acclaimed work displayed at the Tate Britain, Venice Biennale, and Solomon R. Guggenheim Museum.
- Stephen Newton – British artist
- Arthur Spooner – British painter
- Mel Ramsden – British conceptual artist and member of the Art & Language artist group.
- Paul Hart – British landscape photographer.
- Sam Fell – Oscar and BAFTA nominated director of animated films, including Flushed Away.
- Simon Procter – Artist/Photographer, notably working with Karl Lagerfeld, John Galliano and Vivienne Westwood
