= Joseph Else =

British sculptor (1874–1955)

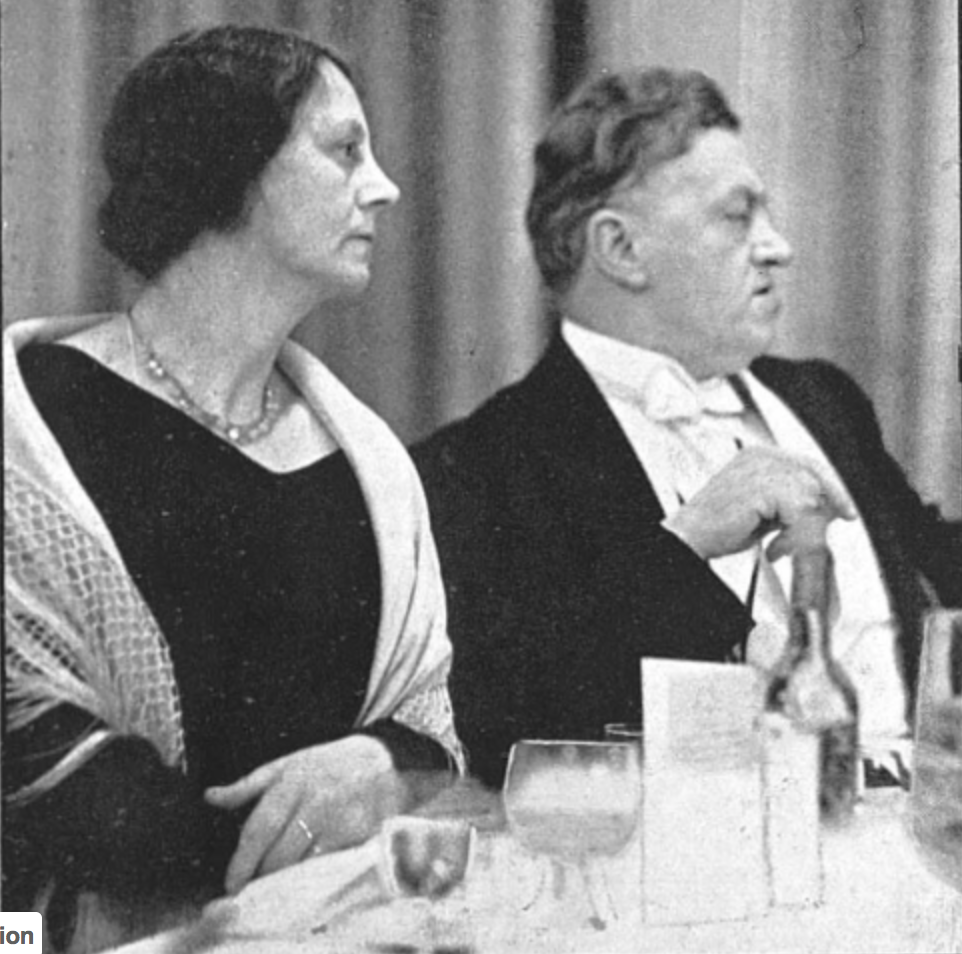
- From The Graphic, 22 March 1930
- Born: February 8, 1874
- Died: May 8, 1955 (aged 81)
- Education: Nottingham School of Art and Royal College of Art
- Known for: Sculpture
- Notable work: Sculpture on Nottingham Council House

Joseph Else FRBS (8 February 1874 – 8 May 1955) was a sculptor from Nottingham best known for his work on Nottingham Council House.

== Career ==
He was the son of William Else, a leather cutter, and Eliza Cowilshaw. He studied at Nottingham School of Art from 1890 to 1900 and then at the Royal College of Art in London. After leaving London he went to the Belfast College of Art as professor of sculpture and lecturer in anatomy.

He began teaching at the Nottingham School of Art around 1919 and in 1922 was made principal, in succession to Joseph Harrison, a position he held until 1939. It was during this tenure that he created some of his most famous sculpture for the new Nottingham Council House, with a work called Justice, and the two lions flanking the main entrance steps. He also created War Memorials for the Law Society, and Messrs. Thomas Forman and Sons, the bronze tablet on the Nottingham Castle sundial in memory of the fallen of the 17th Battalion Sherwood Foresters, the Bonington bronze tablet at Arnold, the Lancashire Memorial of Messrs. J.B. Lewis and Company, the bust of Samuel Morley in Nottingham Arboretum, and the figure on St Luke’s House. In London he completed the sculptural decoration on Selfridges building on Oxford Street.

He was a fierce critic of the modernist style of sculpture, and railed against works produced by Jacob Epstein. In a lecture at the Nottingham Society of Artists in 1928 he said

I feel apologetic for mentioning these abnormalities and would not have done so were it not for the wide publicity accorded to them. To me, it is an affront to the intelligence to suggest that you should admire works so destitute of beauty and so fearful in character. Can things of this description live as the masterpieces of the ancients have done?

He maintained his studio in Beeston. He was appointed an associate member of the Royal Society of British Sculptors in 1923 and in 1938 was elected a Fellow. On retirement from Nottingham in 1939 he moved to Newnham on Severn in Gloucestershire. The outbreak of the Second World War restricted access to materials for sculpture. He became a member of the British Bryological Society, and prepared hundreds of illustrations for A Histology of British Mosses.

He died on 8 May 1955. He is commemorated in the naming of a public house, The Joseph Else, at 11-12 South Parade, Nottingham.

== Works ==
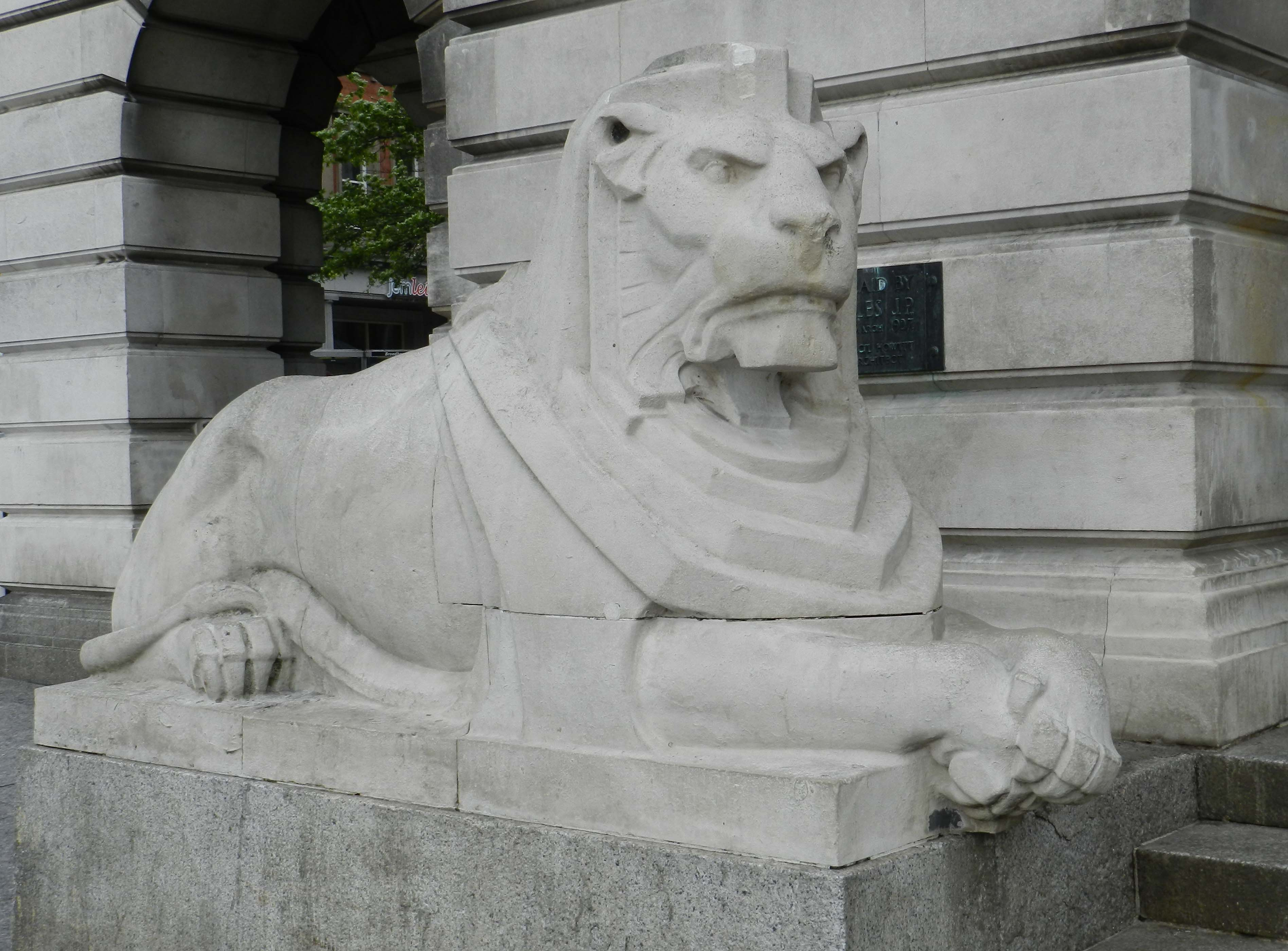
Left lion, Nottingham Council House

- Portrait bust, displayed at the Royal Academy of Arts 1910
- Bust of William Kiddier, displayed at the Royal Academy of Arts 1915
- Model of a War Memorial proposed for Ryde, Isle of Wight 1919
- Bust of Thomas Barrett, displayed at Nottingham Castle Museum 1921
- War Memorial, Nottingham Incorporated Law Society 1921
- Sculpture of A Mask, displayed at the Royal Academy of Arts 1925
- Sculpture of Sacrificium, displayed at the Royal Academy of Arts 1926
- Sculpture of Gladius Sertumque, displayed at the Royal Academy of Arts 1927
- Bust of Samuel Morley, Nottingham Arboretum 1928
- Memorial bronze to Richard Parkes Bonington, Arnold, Nottingham 1929
- Left Lion, Nottingham Council House 1929
- Right Lion, Nottingham Council House 1929
- Frieze on The Old Industries of Nottingham, Nottingham Council House 1929
- Commerce on Nottingham Council House 1929
- Sculpture of Youth, displayed at the Royal Academy of Arts 1932
- Sculpture of The Sun Worshipper (L'Adortrice de Soleil), displayed at the Royal Academy of Arts 1932
- Sculpture of St Luke, St Luke’s House, Friar Lane, Nottingham 1933
- Panel of The Ride of the Valkyries, displayed at the Royal Academy of Arts 1933
