= Arthur Spooner (painter) =

English painter

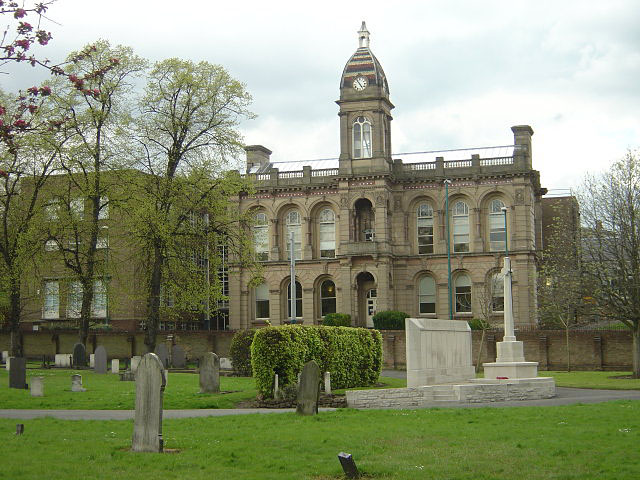
Nottingham School of Art where Arthur Spooner trained and taught.

Arthur Spooner (1873–1962) was a British painter from Nottingham, England.

Spooner was born in Nottingham and trained at the Nottingham School of Art (now part of Nottingham Trent University) in the late 19th century. He later taught landscape and figurative painting there in the early 20th century.

Arthur Spooner was a member of the Nottingham Society of Artists. He painted The Goose Fair, Nottingham in 1926. The painting was sold at Christie's in 2004 and is displayed in Nottingham Castle.

== See also ==
- Nottingham Goose Fair
