= Nottingham Society of Artists =

The Nottingham Society of Artists is an art society in the city of Nottingham, England. It was founded in 1880.

The society is located at 71–73 Friar Lane, near Nottingham Castle and adjacent to the Friar Lane Gallery. The Nottingham-based painter Arthur Spooner (1873–1962) was formerly a member of the society.
