= Nottinghamshire Yeomanry =

Nottinghamshire Yeomanry may refer to one of two Yeomanry cavalry regiments of the British Army:

- Nottinghamshire Yeomanry (Sherwood Rangers), one of the five squadrons of the Royal Yeomanry
- Nottinghamshire Yeomanry (South Nottinghamshire Hussars), a unit of the British Army formed as volunteer cavalry
