= Pelham Street, Nottingham =

Street in Nottingham, England

Pelham Street
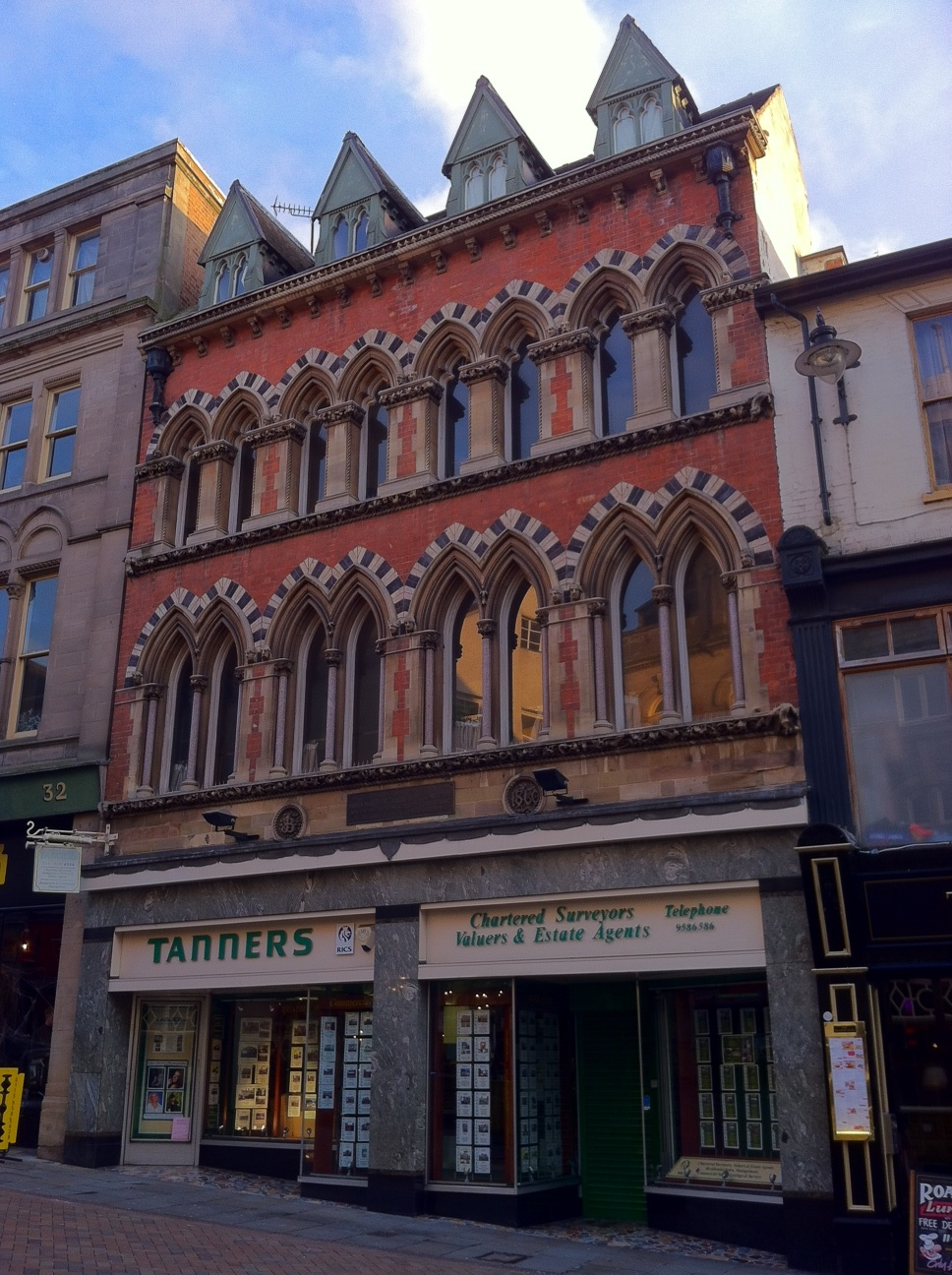
- Former Nottingham Journal offices on Pelham Street. 1860 by Robert Clarke

- Location within Nottingham
- Maintained by: Nottingham City Council
- Coordinates: 52°57′13.2″N 1°8′47.4″W

Pelham Street is an historic street in Nottingham City Centre between High Street and Carlton Street.

== History ==
The street is medieval and was originally known as Gridlesmith Gate or Greytsmythisgate. (Latin: Vicus Magnorum Fabrorum or Vicus Grossorum Fabrorum)

The name was changed around 1800 to Pelham street in compliment to the Duke of Newcastle. In 1844 the western end of the street was widened as far as Thurland Street, and the eastern end was completed about 10 years later.

== Notable buildings ==
- 5 and 7, 2 houses now shops ca. 1810. No. 5 has a doorcase by Sutton and Gregory of 1913.
- 10, Boots the Chemist 1903-04 by Albert Nelson Bromley
- Former Nottingham Journal Offices 1860 by Robert Clarke
- Ormiston House, 1872 (with additions by Evans, Clark and Woollatt in 1937)
- Extension to the Nottingham and Nottinghamshire Bank of 1924-25 by Basil Baily
- Thurland Hall public house, 1898-1900 by Gilbert Smith Doughty
- 27, House, now shop ca. 1800.
- Durham Ox public house, 1902 by George Dennis Martin, now Bodega.
- 39, Lloyds Bank, mid 19th century.
