= Gilbert Smith Doughty =

English architect (1861–1909)

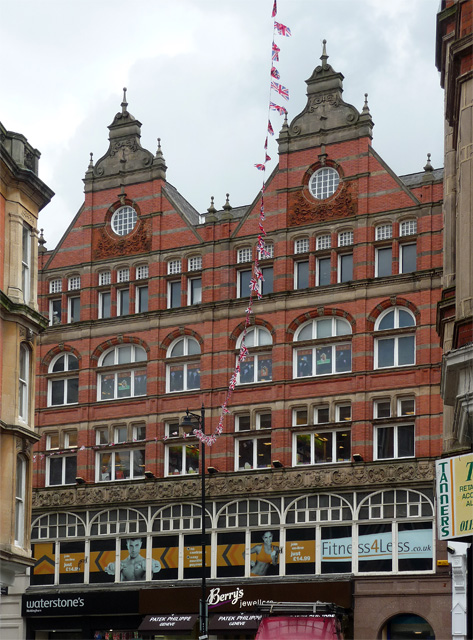
Smart and Brown furnishers, 5-9 Bridlesmith Gate Nottingham 1895

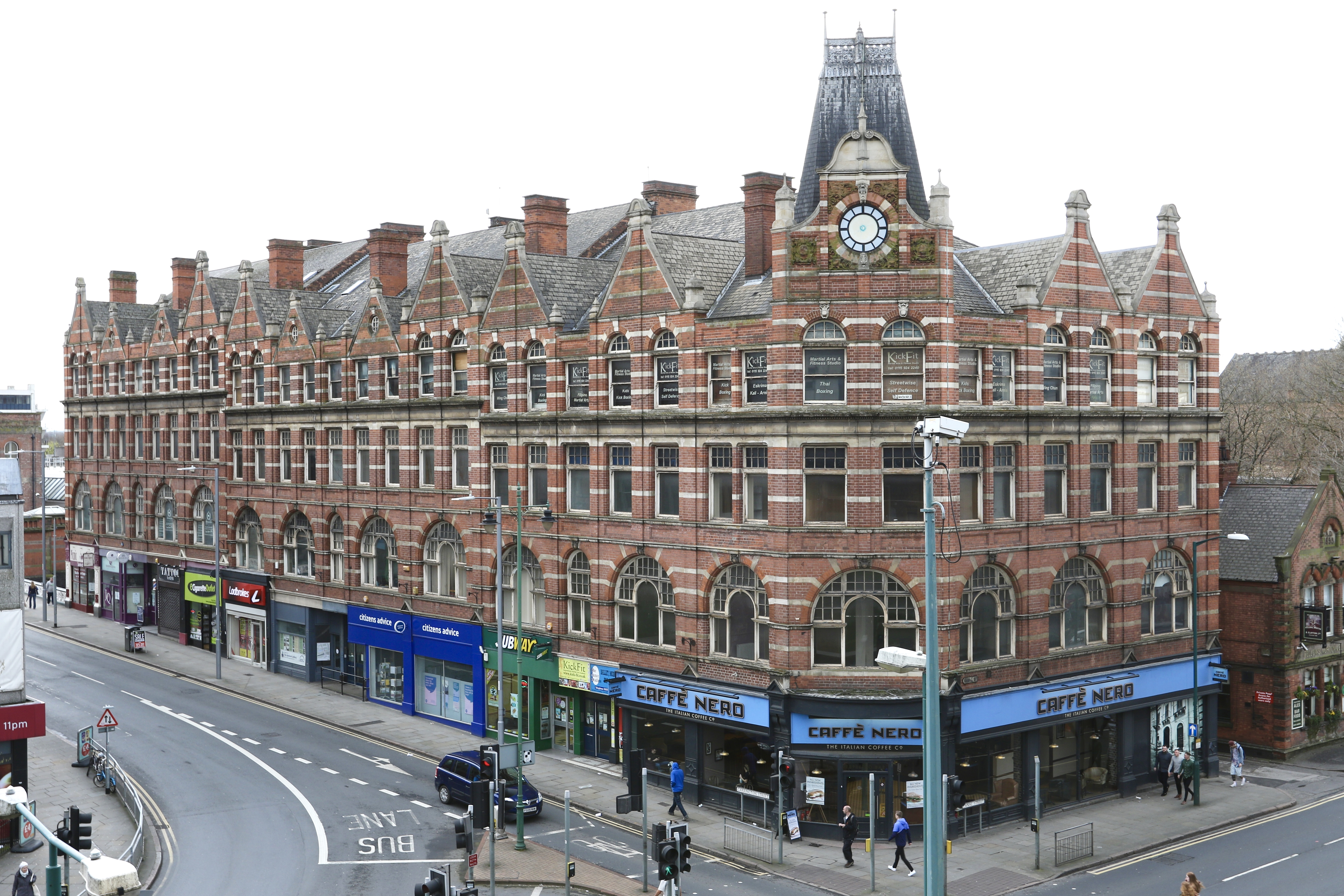
Former premises of Redmayne and Todd, Carrington Street, Nottingham 1896-97

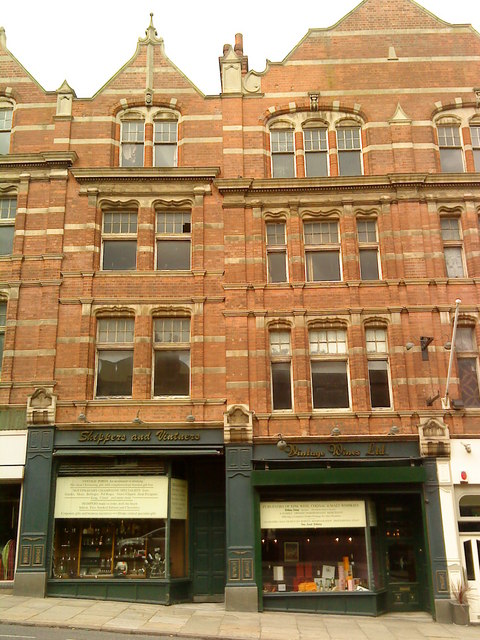
118 Derby Road, Nottingham 1898-99

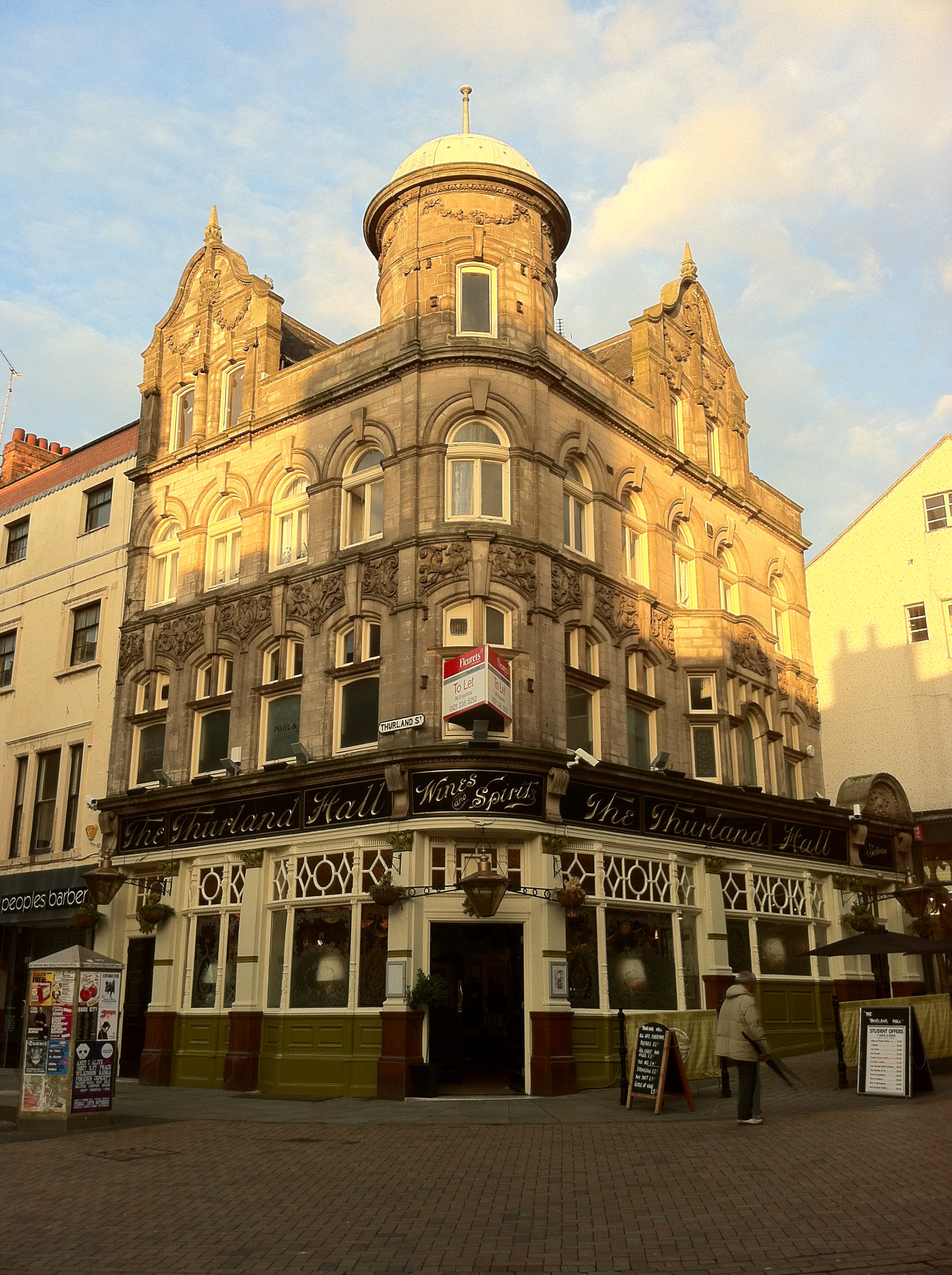
The Thurland Hall, Pelham Street, Nottingham 1898-1900

Captain Gilbert Smith Doughty (1861 – 18 December 1909) CE was an architect based in Nottingham and Matlock.

== History ==
Doughty was born in Nottinghamshire in 1861, the son of Edwin Doughty and Annie Smith. He was a pupil at University School, Nottingham and then studied at the Nottingham School of Art and in 1879 his design for a mantlepiece and glass was included in the annual exhibition.

On 12 April 1894 he married May Edgcombe Rendle in Winslow.

He served for a time in the Robin Hood Rifles, and in 1894 was appointed a captain. He resigned his commission on 13 May 1896.

In 1893 he took over the practice of George Edward Statham in Matlock.

He died in 1909 of alcoholism at his home in Prebend Mansions, Chiswick.

== Works ==
- Foxhall Lodge, Gregory Boulevard, Nottingham ca. 1885
- New Lace Factory, Ilkeston Junction. 1886–87
- St Paul's Church, Hyson Green Nottingham. 1889–91 Addition of the chancel.
- Smedley's Hydro, Matlock 1892–94 new heating facility and baths (completed from plans by Statham)
- The Borough Club, King Street, Nottingham. 1895 demolished 1961
- Wirksworth Infant School 1895
- Smart and Brown, furnishers. 5-9, Bridlesmith Gate, Nottingham 1895
- Redmayne and Todd, Carrington Street, Nottingham 1896–97
- Wirksworth Baptist Chapel 1897 renovation
- Thurland Hall public house, Pelham Street, Nottingham. 1898–1900
- No.s 70-82 Derby Road, Nottingham 1899
- No.s 106-124 Derby Road, Nottingham 1898–99
- Greetwell (house), Manor Park, Ruddington ca. 1900-01
- Mills and Gibbs, 47 Stoney Street, Nottingham 1902 alterations
- 39 Stoney Street, Nottingham 1905 alterations
- Mills Buildings, Plumptre Place, Lace Market, Nottingham 1906
