= Ernest Richard Eckett Sutton =

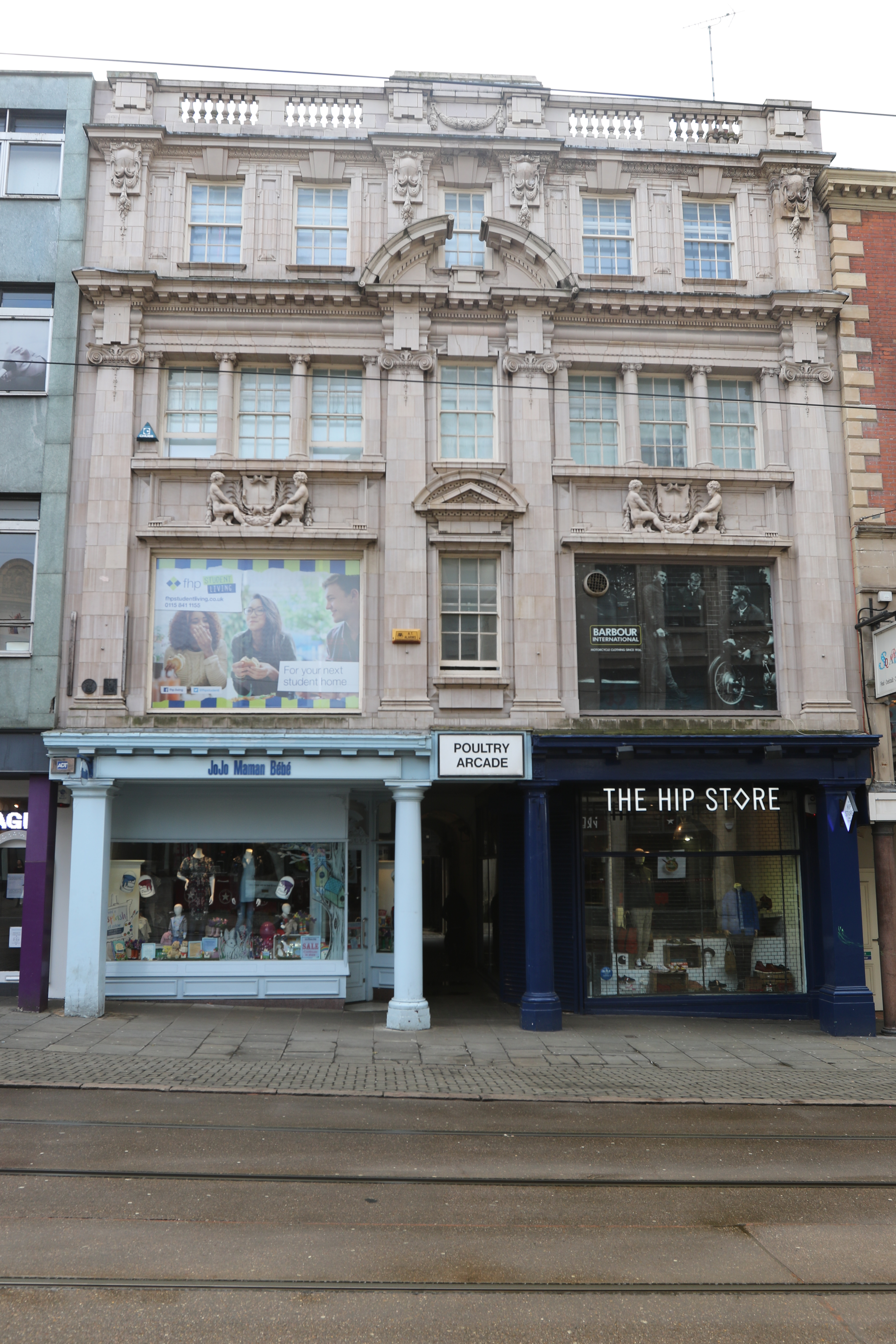
10-11 Poultry, Nottingham 1905-06

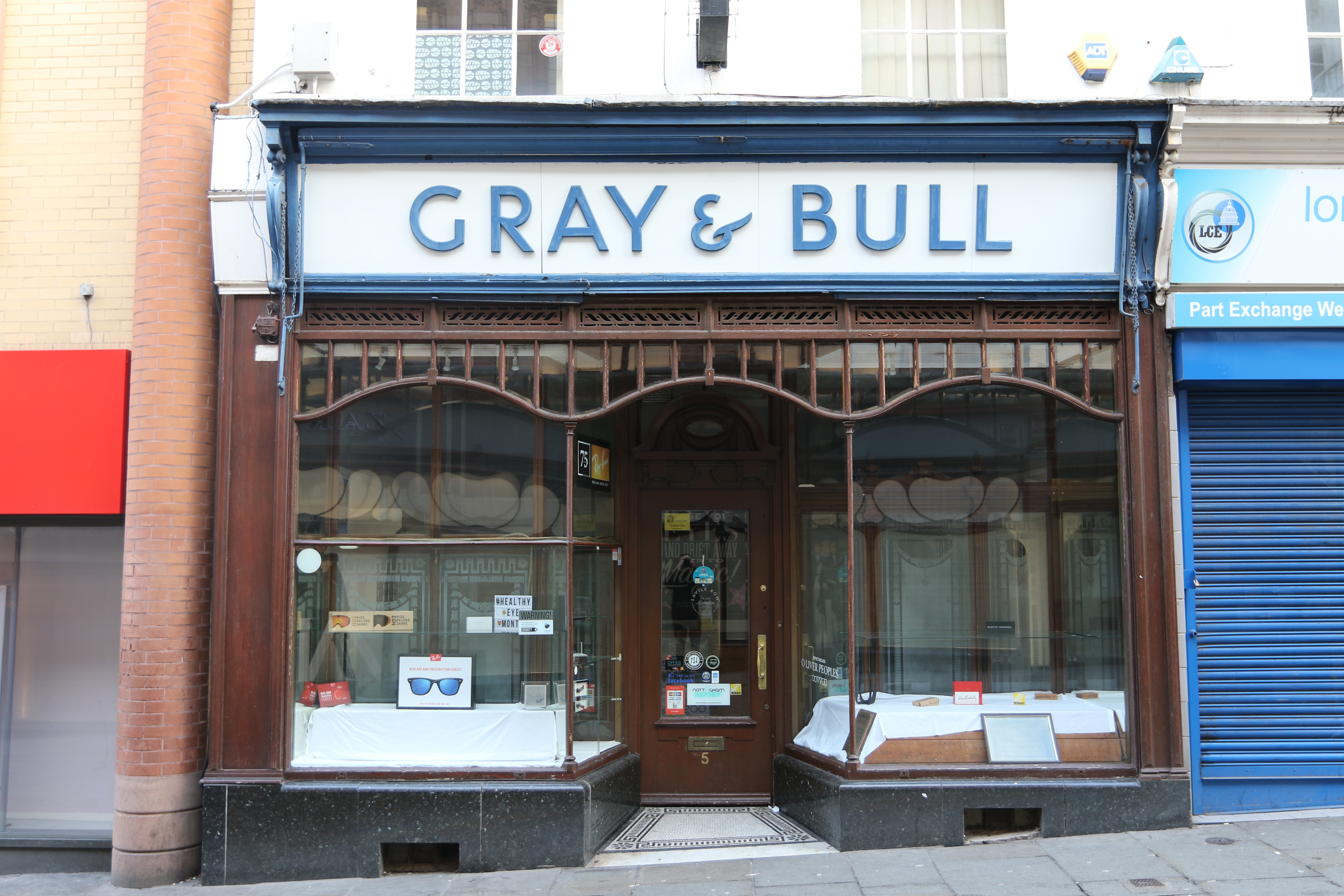
5 Pelham Street, Nottingham 1913

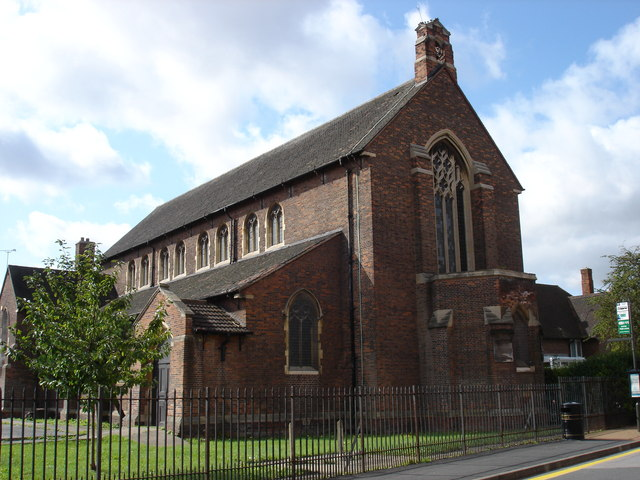
St Faith's Church, Nottingham 1913-15

Ernest Richard Eckett Sutton (1860 - 19 July 1946) FRIBA (also Richard Ernest Eckett Sutton) was an English architect based in Nottingham.

== Career ==
He was born the son of Richard Charles Sutton and was articled to him in 1876. Later he was assistant to Alfred Waterhouse and then Sir Arthur William Blomfield. He started in independent practice in Nottingham in partnership with his father in 1895, and was then in partnership with Frederick William Charles Gregory from 1904 to 1914.

He was made a Fellow of the Royal Institute of British Architects on 9 January 1905. He was president of the Nottinghamshire Architectural Society from 1912-1913 and first president of the Nottinghamshire and Derbyshire Architectural Society from 1913-1914.

He died on 19 July 1946 and left an estate valued at £6610 (equivalent to £346,300 in 2023), to his son, Cecil Alfred Leonard Sutton.

== Notable works ==
- Offices, King Street/Upper Parliament Street, Nottingham 1899
- Gordon Boys’ Home 1902-03
- Mansfield Library 1904-05
- Branch dispensary, Gregory Boulevard, Hyson Green, Nottingham 1904-1905
- 10-11 Poultry, Nottingham 1905-06
- Warehouse, 1 Hollowstone, Nottingham 1908
- Seacroft Hydro Hotel, Skegness (now The Royal Renaissance Hotel)) 1908
- St Helen's Church, Grindleford, Derbyshire 1910
- Congregational Church, Abington Avenue, Northampton 1910
- Mansfield Road Baptist Church 1912-13
- 5 Pelham Street, Nottingham 1913
- St Faith's Church, Nottingham 1913-15
- Basford Library, Vernon Park, Nottingham 1926
- Bulwell Baptist Church 1930
- Hartley Road Children's Home, Nottingham
