= St Paul's Church, Hyson Green =

St. Paul's Church, Hyson Green
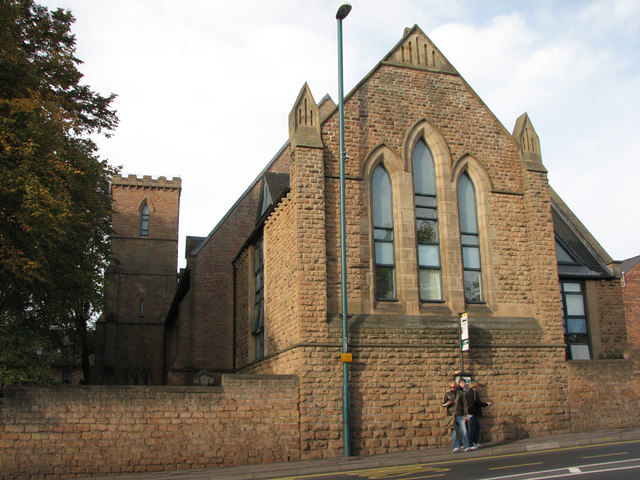
- Former church of St. Paul, Hyson Green, now residential accommodation
- St. Paul's Church, Hyson Green
- 52.9663702°N 1.1710182°W
- Location: Hyson Green, Nottingham
- Country: England
- Denomination: Church of England

Architecture
- Architect: Henry Isaac Stevens
- Completed: 1844
- Closed: 1994

St. Paul's Church, Hyson Green is a former Church of England parish church in Hyson Green, Nottingham.

== History ==
The church was built to designs by the architect Henry Isaac Stevens and opened in 1844 by Rt. Revd. John Kaye the Bishop of Lincoln. The chancel was added in 1889-1891 by the architect Gilbert Smith Doughty.

In 1994 the congregation merged with St. Stephen's Church, Hyson Green, and it closed. The building was then converted into residential accommodation by a housing association.

== Organ ==
A two manual pipe organ was built by Charles Lloyd and opened with a recital by Henry Smart on 19 December 1865.
