= Thurland Hall =

Pub in Nottingham, England

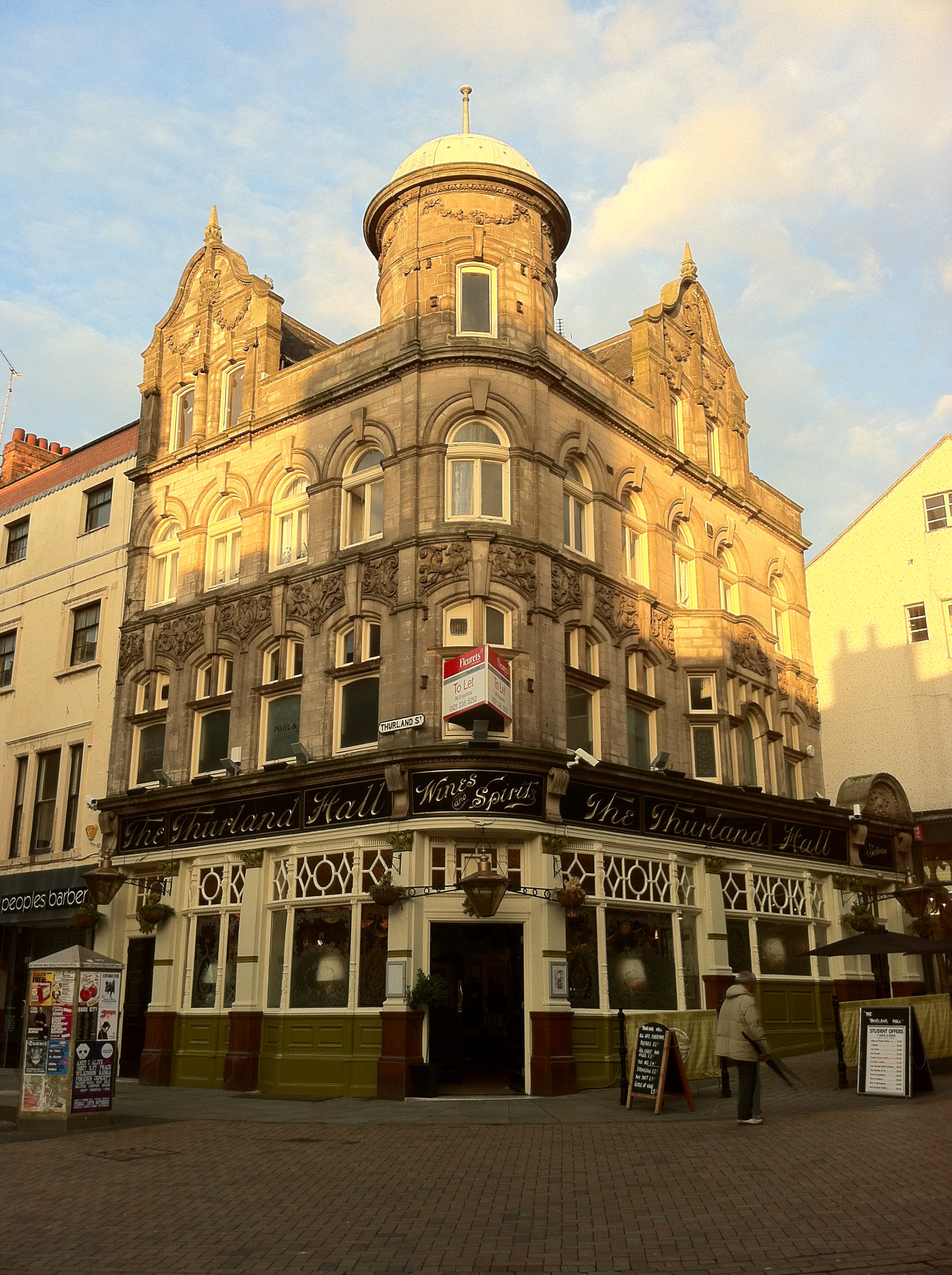
- Thurland Hall

- Location within Nottinghamshire

General information
- Location: Pelham Street, Nottingham, England
- Coordinates: 52°57′14.22″N 1°8′46.76″W
- Construction started: 1898
- Completed: 1900
- Client: Ezekiel Levy and Henry Franks

Design and construction
- Architect: Gilbert Smith Doughty

The Thurland Hall is a Grade II listed public house in Nottingham.

== History ==
The Thurland Hall Vaults public house was built on Pelham Street in the 1830s. It was named after the house of the Earls of Clare which had formerly stood on this site. King James I stayed at Thurland Hall on 17 August 1614.

When the Manchester, Sheffield and Lincolnshire Railway built its extension through Nottingham, the pub was subject to compulsory purchase, and it was rebuilt between 1898 and 1900 for Ezekiel Levy and Henry Franks, licensed victuallers from London to the designs of local architect Gilbert Smith Doughty.

It was restored in the 1990s and again in 2011.
