= St Faith's Church, Nottingham =

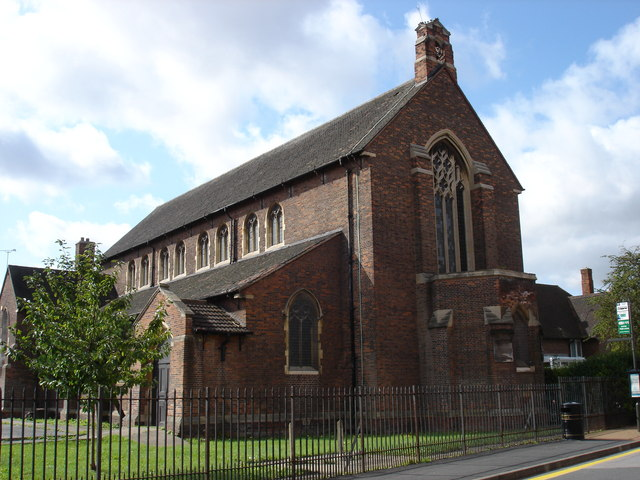
- St Faith's Church, Bathley Street, Nottingham
- St Faith's Church, Nottingham
- 52°56′16.56″N 1°08′39.32″W
- Location: Nottingham
- Country: England
- Denomination: Church of England

History
- Dedication: St Faith
- Consecrated: 16 October 1915

Architecture
- Architect(s): Sutton and Gregory, Nottingham
- Groundbreaking: 26 October 1913
- Completed: 16 October 1915
- Construction cost: £7,000

Specifications
- Capacity: 636

Administration
- Diocese: Diocese of Southwell

St Faith's Church, Nottingham (also known as St Faith's Church, North Wilford) is a former parish church in the Church of England in Nottingham.

== History ==
The church was opened on 16 October 1915 by the Bishop of Southwell It was built at a cost of some £7,000 (equivalent to £622,162 in 2025) and the parish was taken out of that of St Wilfrid's Church, Wilford.

It remained an Anglican parish church until 1981. The building was then adopted by an Elim Pentecostal Church. Later on, it was taken over by the Full Gospel Revival Church which is aiming to raise £500,000 to restore the building.

== Vicars ==
- Albert Edward Barnacle 1914 – 1919
- Sidney Charles Belcher 1919 – 1937 (afterwards vicar of St. Mary's Church, Radcliffe on Trent)
- Angus Inglis 1937 – ???? (later vicar of St Peter's Church, Nottingham)
- Rupert Hoyle Brunt 1946 – 1951 (afterwards vicar of St James' Church, Hampton Hill, London)
- Arthur Gordon Boyd Parsons 1958–1960 (afterwards rector W & E Allington & Sedgebrook & Woolsthorpe, Lincoln
- Michael Thomas Whalley 1960 – 1968
- Gordon Derek Mills 1967 – 1972
- John Pennington of St Mary's Church, Nottingham 1976 – ????

From 1972 to 1976 the church was without a vicar, but was kept in operation during that period by its organist Keith Duckitt.

== Organ ==
The church had two manual pipe organ by E. Wragg & Son. A specification of the organ can be found on the National Pipe Organ Register.
