= Derby Road drill hall =

Grade II listed building in Nottingham

- Nottingham
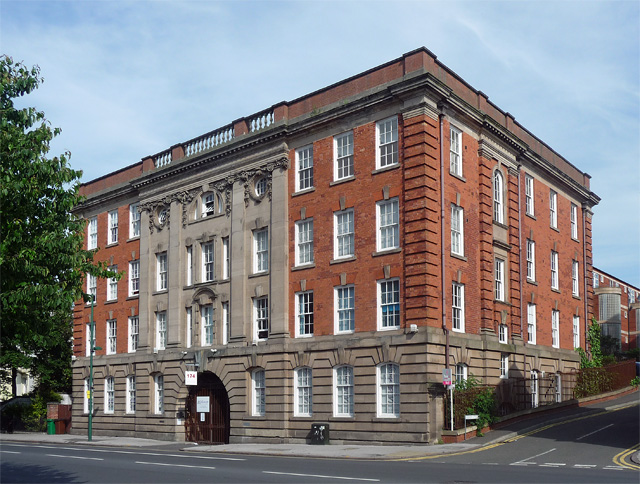
- Derby Road drill hall

Site information
- Type: Drill hall

Location
- Location within Nottinghamshire
- Coordinates: 52.95488°N 1.16417°W

Site history
- Built: c.1910
- Built for: War Office
- Architect: Arthur Brewill and Basil Baily
- In use: c.1910-Present

The Derby Road drill hall is a former military installation in Nottingham, Nottinghamshire. It is a Grade II listed building.

== History ==
The building was designed in the Baroque revival style by architects Arthur Brewill and Basil Baily as the headquarters of the 7th (Robin Hood) Battalion, The Sherwood Foresters and was completed around 1910. The battalion was mobilised at the drill hall in August 1914 before being deployed to the Western Front. The drill hall also served as the headquarters of the South Nottinghamshire Hussars.

The battalion converted to become the 42nd (Robin Hoods, Sherwood Foresters) Search-Light Regiment, Royal Artillery in 1940. This unit evolved to become the 577th (The Robin Hoods, Sherwood Foresters) Search-Light Regiment, Royal Artillery in 1947 and the 350th (The Robin Hood Foresters) Heavy Regiment, Royal Artillery in 1955. Following the cut-backs in 1967, the unit converted back to become D (Robin Hood Foresters) Company, 3rd (Volunteer) Battalion, The Worcestershire and Sherwood Foresters Regiment in 1971. After the unit moved to Foresters House in Chilwell, the Derby Road drill hall was decommissioned and, it became a postal sorting office; it was marketed in 1985 and later converted for residential use.
