= South Nottinghamshire Hussars =

- Badge of the South Nottinghamshire Hussars
- Active: 1826–2014; 2018–
- Country: United Kingdom
- Branch: British Army
- Type: Yeomanry
- Size: Regiment
- Part of: Royal Artillery
- Engagements: Second Boer War; First World War Gallipoli 1915 Egypt 1915–16 Macedonia 1916–17 Palestine 1917–18 France and Flanders 1918 Second World War North Africa 1940–42 North-West Europe 1944–45
- Battle honours: See battle honours below

The South Nottinghamshire Hussars is a unit of the British Army formed as volunteer cavalry in 1794. Converted to artillery in 1922, it presently forms part of 103 (Lancashire Artillery Volunteers) Regiment, Royal Artillery.

== History ==
=== Formation and early history ===
The regiment was formed as the Nottinghamshire (South Nottinghamshire) Yeomanry Cavalry in 1794 as part of the response to the French Revolutionary Wars. It became the Southern Nottinghamshire Regiment of Yeomanry Cavalry in 1826.

=== Second Boer War ===
The Yeomanry was not intended to serve overseas, but due to the string of defeats during Black Week in December 1899, the British government realized they were going to need more troops than just the regular army. A Royal Warrant was issued on 24 December 1899 to allow volunteer forces to serve in the Second Boer War. The Royal Warrant asked standing Yeomanry regiments to provide service companies of about 115 men each for the Imperial Yeomanry, equipped as Mounted infantry. The men and horses of 12th Company left Liverpool on 28 January 1900, sailed to South Africa on Winifredian, and reached Cape Town on 20 February. The mounted infantry experiment was considered a success, and the regiment was designated the Nottinghamshire Imperial Yeomanry (South Nottinghamshire Hussars) from 1901 to 1908. The regiment formed the 12th (South Nottingham) Company of the 3rd Battalion in 1900. The regiment moved to a new drill hall at Derby Road in Nottingham in around 1910.

=== First World War ===
In accordance with the Territorial and Reserve Forces Act 1907 (7 Edw. 7, c.9), which brought the Territorial Force into being, the TF was intended to be a home defence force for service during wartime and members could not be compelled to serve outside the country. However, on the outbreak of war on 4 August 1914, many members volunteered for Imperial Service. Therefore, TF units were split in August and September 1914 into 1st Line (liable for overseas service) and 2nd Line (home service for those unable or unwilling to serve overseas) units. Later, a 3rd Line was formed to act as a reserve, providing trained replacements for the 1st and 2nd Line regiments.

==== 1/1st South Nottinghamshire Hussars ====
The 1st was formed in Nottingham in April 1908 on the creation of the new Territorial Force and became part of the Nottinghamshire and Derbyshire Mounted Brigade, which was a component of the 1st Mounted Division. It became the 1/1st in 1914 when the TF created its second-line units. The Brigade was transferred to serve with the 2nd Mounted Division, and saw service in the Gallipoli Campaign. In 1916, the Division was broken up and the Brigade was redesignated the 7th Mounted Brigade and moved to Salonika in 1917.

The regiment returned to Egypt in June 1917, when it was attached to the Desert Mounted Corps, until April 1918, when it left the Brigade and was dismounted to form B Battalion, Machine Gun Corps with the 1/1st Warwickshire Yeomanry.

The battalion left Egypt for France, arriving in June 1918. It was later numbered as the 100th (Warwickshire and South Nottinghamshire Yeomanry) Battalion, Machine Gun Corps. At the Armistice, it was serving as Army Troops with the Fourth Army.

==== 2/1st South Nottinghamshire Hussars ====
The 2nd Line regiment began to form in Nottingham on 20 September 1914. It was based at Colwick Racecourse for the winter of 1914/15. At the end of February 1915, it moved to Ollerton and joined the 2/1st Nottinghamshire and Derbyshire Mounted Brigade. By June, the brigade was in the 2/2nd Mounted Division at Narford Park near Swaffham. On 31 March 1916, the remaining Mounted Brigades were ordered to be numbered in a single sequence and the brigade became the 9th Mounted Brigade (and the division 3rd Mounted Division).

In July 1916, there was a major reorganization of 2nd Line yeomanry units in the United Kingdom. All but 12 regiments were converted to cyclists and as a consequence the regiment was dismounted; the brigade was redesignated as the 9th Cyclist Brigade and the division as the 1st Cyclist Division. The regiment was in the Canterbury area and was still there when the brigade was renumbered as 5th Cyclist Brigade in November 1916. The regiment remained near Canterbury in 1917 and the brigade was an independent formation from September to December 1917. During 1918, the regiment was at Littlebourne (near Canterbury), still in the 5th Cyclist Brigade but now in The Cyclist Division.

==== 3/1st South Nottinghamshire Hussars ====
The 3rd Line regiment was formed at Ollerton in May 1915. In September, it moved to Derby and was affiliated to the 14th Reserve Cavalry Regiment at Aldershot. In October 1916, it moved to Ireland with the 14th Reserve Cavalry Regiment and in February 1917 it was absorbed into the 2nd Reserve Cavalry Regiment at The Curragh.

=== Between the wars ===
Post war, a commission was set up to consider the shape of the Territorial Force (Territorial Army (TA) from 1 October 1921). The experience of the First World War made it clear that cavalry was surfeit. The commission decided that only the 14 most senior regiments were to be retained as cavalry, the others would be converted to other roles. (Note: The Lovat Scouts and the Scottish Horse also remained mounted as "scouts"; eight regiments were converted to Armoured Car Companies of the Royal Tank Corps (RTC), one was reduced to a battery in another regiment, one was absorbed into a local infantry battalion, one became a signals regiment and two were disbanded; the remaining 25 regiments were converted into RFA brigades) Many became brigades (Note: The basic organic unit of the Royal Artillery was, and is, the Battery. When grouped together they formed brigades, in the same way that infantry battalions or cavalry regiments were grouped together in brigades. At the outbreak of World War I a field artillery brigade of headquarters (4 officers, 37 other ranks), three batteries (5 and 193 each), and a brigade ammunition column (4 and 154) had a total strength just under 800 so was broadly comparable to an infantry battalion (just over 1,000) or a cavalry regiment (about 550). Like an infantry battalion, an artillery brigade was usually commanded by a lieutenant-colonel. Artillery brigades were redesignated as regiments in 1938.) of the Royal Field Artillery (RFA), including the South Notts Hussars, which became a two-battery brigade as the 107th (South Nottinghamshire Hussars Yeomanry) Army Brigade, RFA, in 1922. It served as 'Army Troops' in 46th (North Midland) Divisional Area.

In 1924 the RFA was subsumed into the Royal Artillery (RA) and in November 1938, the Royal Artillery renamed its brigades as regiments, when the regiment was designated as Royal Horse Artillery (RHA). In April 1939, as part of the general doubling of the TA following the Munich Crisis, the 107th (SNHY) formed 150th (South Nottinghamshire Hussars) Regiment, RHA, as a duplicate from a cadre of 107th and 210 Battery of a local RA Unit, and a Searchlight battery of the Royal Engineers.

=== Second World War ===
==== 107th (South Nottinghamshire Hussars) Regiment, RHA ====
At the start of the war, the 107 Royal Horse Artillery (South Notts Hussars Yeomanry), which was part of Northern Command, consisted of two batteries, the 425th and the 426th, each with 8 Ordnance QF 18-pounder field guns. It soon came under the command of the 1st Cavalry Division, with which it served in Palestine. The regiment later served at Mersa Matruh, Egypt, the Suez Canal, Tobruk, Tmimi, the Nile Delta, Sidi Bishr (Alexandria) and Beni Yusef.

In April 1942, the regiment was redesignated as the 107th (South Nottinghamshire Hussars Yeomanry) Field Regt RHA (by which time it had gained a third battery, the 520th). Shortly thereafter, it was destroyed almost to a man while fighting the Battle of Knightsbridge, providing a suicidal defensive rear-guard action to cover the retreat of the British Army during the Battle of Gazala campaign.

The remnants were reformed as the 107th (SNH Yeo) Medium Battery RA. The battery served with the 7th Medium Regiment RA, as part of the 8th Army, in North Africa, Sicily and Italy. In March 1944, the regiment returned to the UK to join the 2nd Army. At this time, the 107th Battery was redesignated as the 425th Battery and left to join the newly formed 107th Medium Regiment RA - the recently disbanded 16th Medium Regiment RA provided the Regimental HQ and the 426th Battery. In June, the 107th Regiment was assigned to 2nd Army's 9th Army Group Royal Artillery ('9th AGRA'), with which it served in NW Europe.

===== Equipment =====
The 107th was equipped with the following during the course of the war:

16 × 18-pdr Mk IV & Lorries
Ordnance QF 18 pounderMk II
18-pdr Mk IIPA, 425 Bty
4.5-inch howitzer, 426 Bty
25-pdr & Quads, Bren Carrier OP

==== 150th (South Nottinghamshire Hussars) Regiment, RHA ====
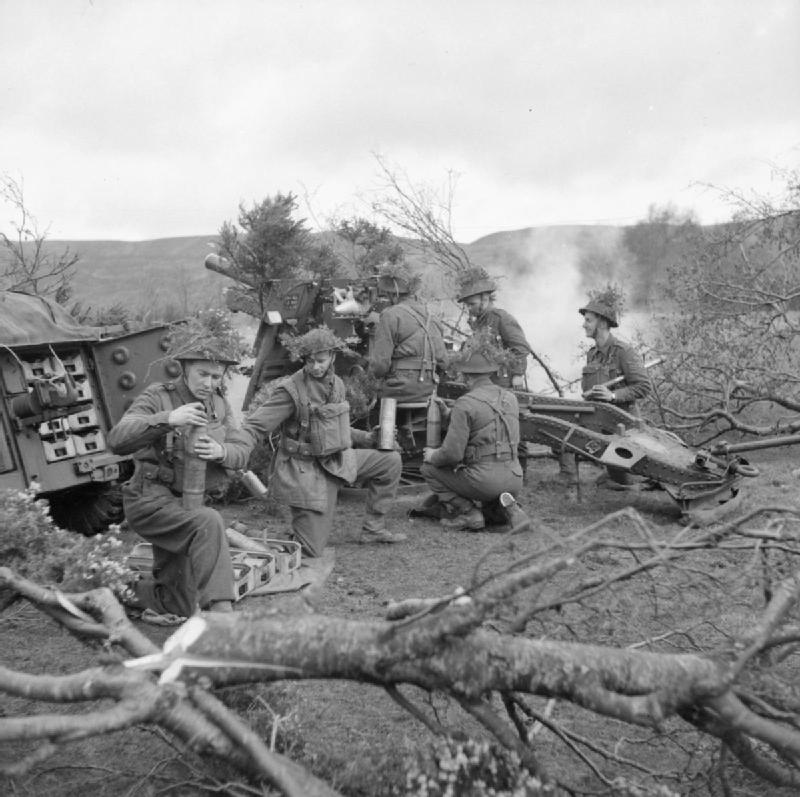
A 25-pdr field gun of 150th Field Regiment, Royal Artillery, 148th Independent Infantry Brigade Group, firing during Exercise 'Dragoon' in the Sperrin Mountains near Draperstown in Northern Ireland, 1 April 1942 (IWM H18493)

The 150th, which was also part of Northern Command at the start of the war, also had two batteries, the 434th and the 435th. In June 1940, it was redesignated as the 150th (South Nottinghamshire Hussars Yeomanry) Field Regiment RA. A third battery, the 514th, was formed in January 1941.

During the war, the regiment was at various times part of the 148th Infantry Brigade, 79th Armoured Division and 4th AGRA. It was equipped with 25pdr field guns for the first time in November 1940, whilst stationed in Ireland. It was the first TA Artillery Unit to be equipped with the brand new MKII 25pdr, on MKII Chassis. The recce party of the regiment landed in France on 7 June 1944 and the guns arrived two days later.

150th (SNH Yeo) Regiment RA was disbanded in November 1944, owing to a lack of Infantry in the British Army, but an excess of gunners without guns.

=== Postwar ===
The two regiments were reconstituted in the TA in 1947, the 107th as 307th (South Nottinghamshire Hussars Yeomanry) Field Regiment, RA, the 150th becoming 350th (South Nottinghamshire Hussars Yeomanry) Heavy Regiment, RA. In 1950 the 350th merged into 350 (Robin Hood Foresters) Light Regiment, RA. The 307th regained its RHA distinction in 1955, first as 307th (RHA) (South Nottinghamshire Hussars Yeomanry) Field Regiment, RA, then from 1967 as The South Nottinghamshire Hussars Yeomanry (RHA). In 1969 it was reduced to cadre strength and placed under 101st (Northumbrian) Medium Regiment, then was restored to battery strength the following year (as 307th (South Notts Hussars) Battery). Latterly it formed part of 100th (Yeomanry) Regiment Royal Artillery but was placed in suspended animation under Army 2020.

In January 2018, the Royal Artillery returned to Nottingham, as C (South Nottinghamshire Hussars) Troop, 210 (Staffordshire) Battery, of 103rd (Lancashire Artillery Volunteers) Regiment, RA.

== Regimental museum ==
The Royal Lancers and Nottinghamshire Yeomanry Museum is based at Thoresby Hall in Nottinghamshire.

== Battle honours ==
The South Nottinghamshire Hussars was awarded the following battle honours (honours in bold are emblazoned on the regimental colours):

Second Boer War	**South Africa 1900–02**
First World War	**Hindenburg Line**, **Épehy**, St Quentin Canal, Beaurevoir, **Selle**, **Sambre**, France and Flanders 1918, **Struma**, Macedonia 1916–17, **Suvla**, **Scimitar Hill**, Gallipoli 1915, Egypt 1915–16, **Gaza**, **El Mughar**, **Nebi Samwil**, Palestine 1917–18
Second World War	The Royal Artillery was present in nearly all battles and would have earned most of the honours awarded to cavalry and infantry regiments. In 1833, William IV awarded the motto Ubique (meaning "everywhere") in place of all battle honours.

== See also ==
- Imperial Yeomanry
- List of Yeomanry Regiments 1908
- Yeomanry
- Yeomanry order of precedence
- British yeomanry during the First World War
- Second line yeomanry regiments of the British Army
- List of British Army Yeomanry Regiments converted to Royal Artillery

== Bibliography ==
- Dobson, Eric B. (1948). History of the South Nottinghamshire Hussars 1924-1948. York and London: Herald Printing Works.
- Fellows, George; Freeman, Benson (1928). Historical Records of the South Nottinghamshire Hussars Yeomanry, 1794 to 1924. Aldershot: Gale & Polden.
- Hart, Peter. To the Last Round. Pen & Sword Books.
- James, Brigadier E.A. (1978). British Regiments 1914–18. London: Samson Books Limited. ISBN 0-906304-03-2.
- Litchfield, Norman E.H. (1992). The Territorial Artillery 1908–1988 (Their Lineage, Uniforms and Badges). Nottingham: Sherwood Press. ISBN 0-9508205-2-0..
- Mileham, Patrick (1994). The Yeomanry Regiments; 200 Years of Tradition. Edinburgh: Canongate Academic. ISBN 1-898410-36-4.
- Rinaldi, Richard A (2008). Order of Battle of the British Army 1914. Ravi Rikhye. ISBN 978-0-97760728-0.
- Order of Battle of the British Armies in France, November 11th, 1918. France: General Staff, GHQ. 1918.
- Titles and Designations of Formations and Units of the Territorial Army. London: War Office. 1927. (RA sections also summarised in Litchfield, Appendix IV)
