= Robin Hood Battalion =

British military unit (1859–1992)

7th (Robin Hood) Battalion, Sherwood Foresters
- Active: 1859–1992
- Country: United Kingdom
- Branch: Territorial Army
- Role: Infantry; Air Defence
- Part of: 139th (Sherwood Foresters) Brigade
- Garrison/HQ: Derby Road, Nottingham
- Engagements: WWI: Hohenzollern Redoubt; Gommecourt; Hill 70; Third Ypres; Bourlon Wood; German spring offensive Bailleul; WWII: The Blitz; North West Europe
- Decorations: Croix de Guerre (Belgium)

The Robin Hood Battalion was a unit of the Volunteer Force of the British Army and Territorial Force, later the Territorial Army. The battalion served as infantry during the 1916 Easter Uprising in Dublin and then served on the Western Front during World War I. In the 1930s, it re-roled as an anti-aircraft unit and served in World War II, including North-western Europe from June 1944 to May 1945.

== Formation ==
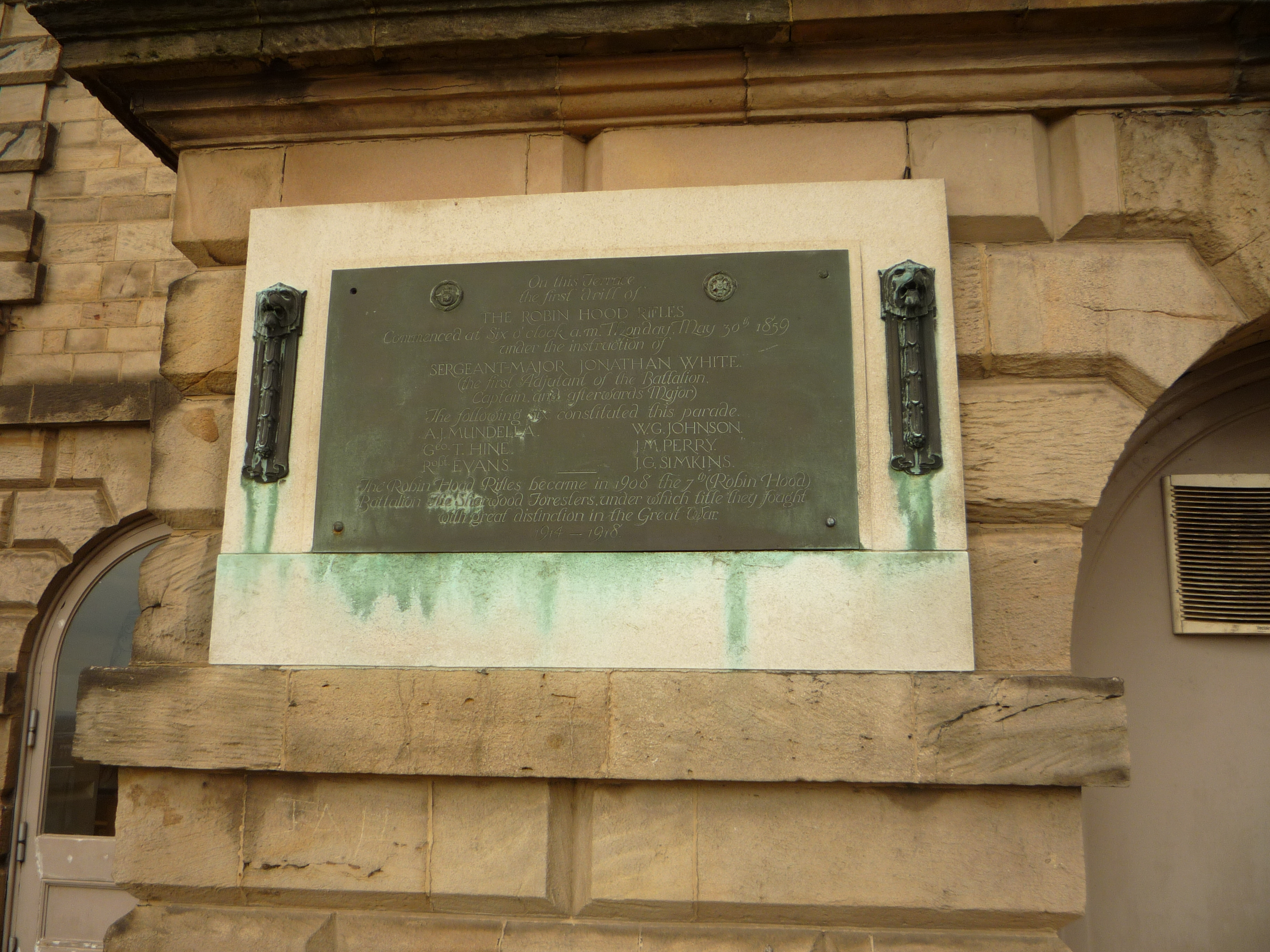
Plaque on the terrace of Nottingham Castle commemorating the raising of the Robin Hood Rifles in 1859

The unit was formed on 30 May 1859 when six volunteers paraded at Nottingham Castle under Sergeant-Major Jonathan White. (White became the Adjutant and was still an officer in the corps 40 years later with the honorary rank of colonel.) It was one of many such Rifle Volunteer Corps (RVCs) to be formed at a time of increased fear of war with France, which created a flurry of interest in establishing such volunteer corps by the more affluent classes of British society. The unit was simply known as the Robin Hood Rifles in honour of Nottingham's legendary Robin Hood.

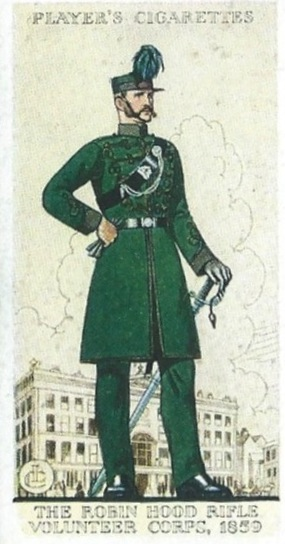
Uniform of the Robin Hood Rifles depicted on a 1939 cigarette card

By October 1859, five separate company-sized Rifle Volunteer Corps (RVCs) had been raised in Nottingham, the first officers' commissions were issued on 15 November, and by December they had been combined into a battalion as the Robin Hood RVC, becoming the 1st Nottinghamshire (Robin Hood) RVC of nine companies by March 1860. One company was raised by A.J. Mundella from employees of his hosiery mill. The unit adopted a uniform of Rifle green with black facings.

In 1881, following the Cardwell-Childers Reforms, the Sherwood Foresters (Derbyshire Regiment), later the Sherwood Foresters (Nottinghamshire and Derbyshire Regiment), was formed as the county regiment, and the 1st Nottinghamshire (Robin Hood) RVC (now 10 companies strong) became its 3rd Volunteer Battalion without changing its title. An 11th company was added in 1895, a 12th in 1896, and during the Second Boer War 1900–01 the establishment was increased in 1900–01 to 18 companies (including two cyclist companies), divided into two battalions, together with a cadet corps at Nottingham High School.

The battalion was part of the North Midland Brigade from 1888 until 1901 when that formation split to form a separate Sherwood Foresters Brigade.

== Boer War ==
In 1900, men of the battalion volunteered for service in the Boer War that which had been raging since 1899 and contingent sailed for South Africa in February. During the campaign, it took part in three pitched battles and 25 smaller engagements. Sergeant Hickinbottom was Mentioned in dispatches and awarded the Distinguished Conduct Medal (DCM), and the battalion was awarded its first Battle honour South Africa 1900–1902.

== Territorial Force ==
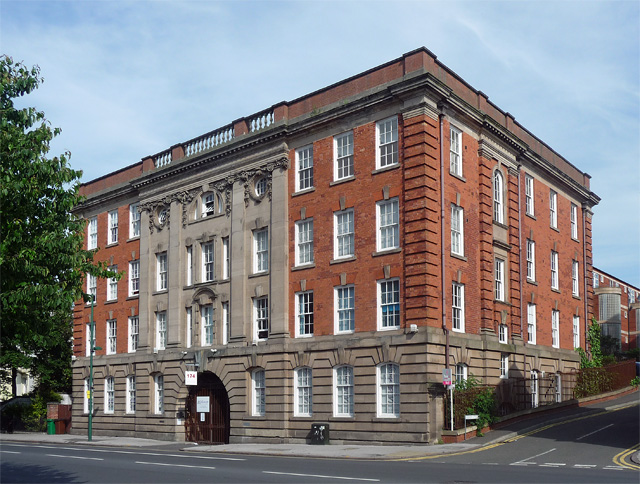
The Robin Hoods' drill hall in Derby Road, Nottingham.

When the Volunteers were subsumed into the new Territorial Force (TF) under the Haldane Reforms of 1908, the 1st Nottinghamshire Volunteer Rifle Corps became the 7th (Robin Hood) Battalion, Sherwood Foresters. It built a new Drill Hall in Derby Road in 1910.

== World War I ==
When the First World War began in August 1914, the Robin Hood Rifles continued to be part of the Nottinghamshire and Derbyshire Brigade (later the 139th (1/1st Nottinghamshire and Derbyshire) Brigade), North Midland Division (later the 46th (North Midland) Division).

On 19 September, a duplicate battalion of the Robin Hoods was formed, the original becoming the 1/7th. This duplicate joined the 2nd Nottinghamshire and Derbyshire Brigade, 2nd North Midland Division, which later became the 178th (2nd Nottinghamshire and Derbyshire) Brigade and 59th (2nd North Midland) Division respectively. Another duplicate battalion, the 3/7th, was formed in March 1915; this battalion remained in Britain for the duration of the war, became 7th (Reserve) Battalion in April 1916, later absorbing the 8th (Reserve) Battalion in September 1916.

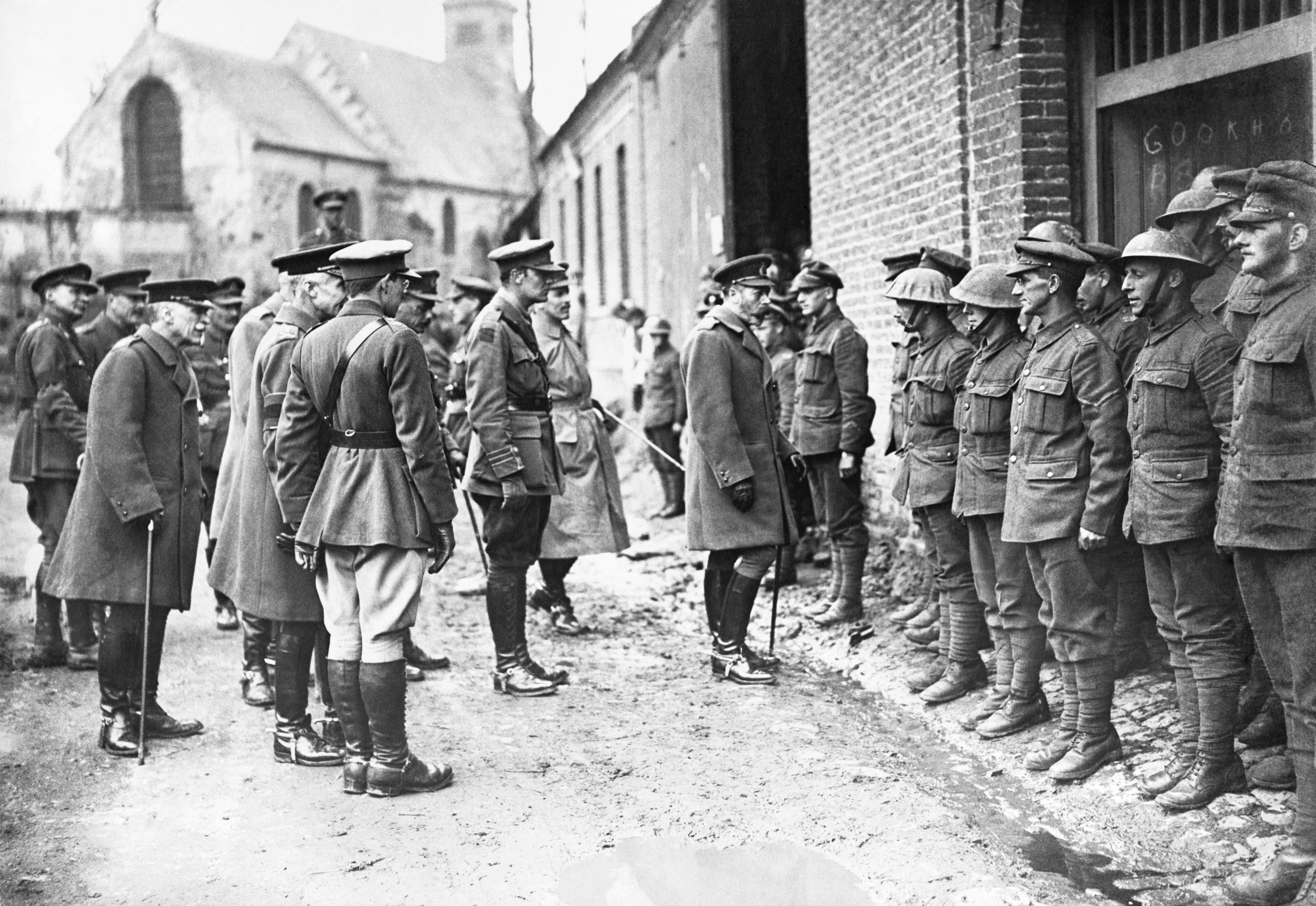
King George V, escorted by Lieutenant Colonel Reginald B. Rickman and Captain W. Foster MC, talking to Private Denny and the remainder of the 7th (Robin Hood) Battalion, Nottinghamshire and Derbyshire Regiment (Sherwood Foresters), 59th Division, at Hermin, after the Battle of Bullecourt, 30th March 1918.

The 1/7th Battalion landed in France in February 1915 with the rest of the 46th Division. The battalion saw heavy fighting at the Battle of Hohenzollern Redoubt – a subsidiary action of the Battle of Loos – which was their first major action of the war. The battalion received its first Victoria Cross (VC) when Temporary Captain Geoffrey Vickers was awarded the VC – the highest award for bravery in the face of the enemy – for his actions at Hohenzollern on 14 October. The battalion was involved in the first day of the Battle of the Somme on 1 July 1916 and the brigade they were part of sustained very severe casualties in the Attack on the Gommecourt Salient.

In the home front, the 2/7th Robin Hoods had, meanwhile, been sent to Ireland with the rest of the 59th Division to help suppress the 1916 Easter Uprising in Dublin. The division returned to England in January 1917 and then moved to France in February. The 2/7th Battalion took part in many actions, including the Battle of Passchendaele and Cambrai. The battalion was absorbed by the 1/7th on 31 January 1918 and the Robin Hoods reverted to their original name, the 7th (Robin Hood) Battalion. On 7 May, the 7th Robin Hoods were reduced to cadre strength. The First World War ended on 11 November 1918. On 14 June 1919, the Battalion was disbanded.

During the First World War, Captain Albert Ball – fourth ranking ace of the Royal Flying Corps – had been awarded the Victoria Cross for his actions in 1916–1917 while seconded from the Robin Hoods.

== Between the wars ==
In 1920, the Territorial Force was reformed as the "Territorial Army" and, on 7 February, the 7th (Robin Hood) Battalion (TA) was re-raised, once more forming part of the 46th (North Midland) Division. With the advent of air power, and the reduced need for so much infantry, the Robin Hoods were one of many units to be converted to the anti-aircraft role. The battalion re-roled as a unit of the Royal Engineers on 10 December 1936 and became the 42nd (The Robin Hoods, Sherwood Foresters) Anti-Aircraft Battalion, Royal Engineers. It joined the 32nd (Midland) Anti-Aircraft Group, 2nd Anti-Aircraft Division (formerly 46th (North Midland) Division) and was based in the West Riding region. In this role the Robin Hoods were organised as follows:

- Battalion HQ at Nottingham
- 366 AA Company at Carlton
- 367 AA Company at Beeston
- 368 AA Company at Bulwell
- 369 AA Company at Sutton-in-Coldfield, Warwickshire

== World War II ==
=== Mobilisation ===
90 cm 'Projector Anti-Aircraft', displayed at Fort Nelson, Portsmouth

The TA's AA units were mobilised on 23 September 1938 during the Munich Crisis, with units manning their emergency positions within 24 hours, even though many did not yet have their full complement of men or equipment. The emergency lasted three weeks, and they were stood down on 13 October. In February 1939 the existing AA defences came under the control of a new Anti-Aircraft Command. In June, a partial mobilisation of TA units was begun in a process known as 'couverture', whereby each AA unit did a month's tour of duty in rotation to man selected AA and searchlight positions. On 24 August, ahead of the declaration of war, AA Command was fully mobilised at its war stations.

On mobilisation, the battalion deployed 366, 368 and 369 AA Cos as part of 39 AA Bde and battalion HQ moved from Nottingham to Red House at South Collingham, near Newark-on-Trent.

=== Battle of Britain and Blitz ===
When the RE AA battalions were transferred to the RA in August 1940, the battalion became 42nd (The Robin Hoods, Sherwood Foresters) Searchlight Regiment, RA, retaining its Robin Hoods cap badge in silver for officers and white metal for other ranks, together with a Rifle green lanyard instead of the white lanyard normally worn by the RA. By now the Battle of Britain was on; the regiment was still in 2 AA Division but had transferred to 50 Light AA Bde covering Nottingham and Derby. It continued to serve with this formation during the Blitz, including the Nottingham Blitz of 8/9 May 1941, a misdirected attempt to bomb the Rolls-Royce aero engine works at Derby, which was one of the last raids of the campaign.

=== Mid-War ===
In 1941, the searchlight layout over the Midlands was reorganised, so that any hostile raid approaching the Gun Defended Areas (GDA) around the towns must cross more than one searchlight belt, and then within the GDAs the concentration of lights was increased.

On 17 April 1941, 42nd S/L Regt sent a cadre of experienced officers and NCOs to 233rd S/L Training Rgt at Saighton Camp to form a new 563rd S/L Bty, but AA Command now had more S/L units that it needed, and the new battery was immediately disbanded.

The regiment remained with 50 LAA Bde for the next two years. The brigade became part of 5 AA Group in October 1942 when the AA divisions were scrapped in favour of an organisation that closely corresponded to the groups of RAF Fighter Command. In March 1943, 42nd S/L Rgt moved back to 39 AA Bde, then in April on to 57 AA Bde (with 366 and 369 S/L Btys attached to 50 LAA Bde), and finally in May to 31 (North Midland) AA Bde – all within 5 AA Group.

=== North West Europe ===
In early 1944, the regiment was in the North of England under 31 AA Bde, which was one of the formations earmarked for the Allied invasion of Normandy, Operation Overlord. 369 Bty was disbanded on 23 February, and the remainder of the regiment underwent special training to support Night fighters over the Normandy beachhead.

After D-Day (6 June), the regiments of 31 AA Bde waited in England for their turn to embark for Normandy to join 21st Army Group. However, the planned night fighter belt over the beachhead was cancelled and the Robin Hoods remained in England. On 1 August, the regiment left its staging camp and deployed in the AA role round RAF Colerne in Wiltshire, then on 6 August it moved to RAF Middle Wallop and relieved 69th (3rd City of London) S/L Rgt, establishing Regimental HQ (RHQ) at Fonthill Abbey, near Tisbury, Wiltshire. On 24 August, the regiment was relieved by 54th (Durham Light Infantry) S/L Rgt and concentrated around Tisbury, where it was at 6 hours' notice to move to its marshalling area.

On 1 September, RHQ under the command of Lt-Col C.W. Cronin moved to Storrington, West Sussex, and then on 12 September to an embarkation marshalling area at Whipps Cross Camp, near London. From there it embarked at Royal Albert Dock aboard SS Empire Swordsman and disembarked by landing craft at Arromanches-les-Bains in Normandy on 18 September. It then moved by stages to Brussels, where it arrived on 24 September.

Also on 1 September, 366 S/L Bty moved from Alderbury, Wiltshire, to a concentration area at West Chiltington, West Sussex, then on 17 September to the embarkation marshalling area at Lee-on-the-Solent, Hampshire. It was shipped to Arromanches in three groups, 18–22 September, and concentrated at Sainte-Croix-sur-Mer before moving to Dieppe where it came under the command of 80 AA Bde on 25 September. Similarly, 367 S/L Bty arrived at Brussels, and 368 S/L Bty at Ostend.

While 367 SL Bty joined the AA defence of Brussels, the rest of 42nd S/L Rgt was deployed in a joint AA and coastal defence role along the Scheldt estuary. 366 S/L Battery under the operational control of 56 US AA Artillery Bde set up 90 cm lights to illuminate any surface craft trying to approach Antwerp and allow LAA guns to engage them.

=== Defence of Antwerp ===
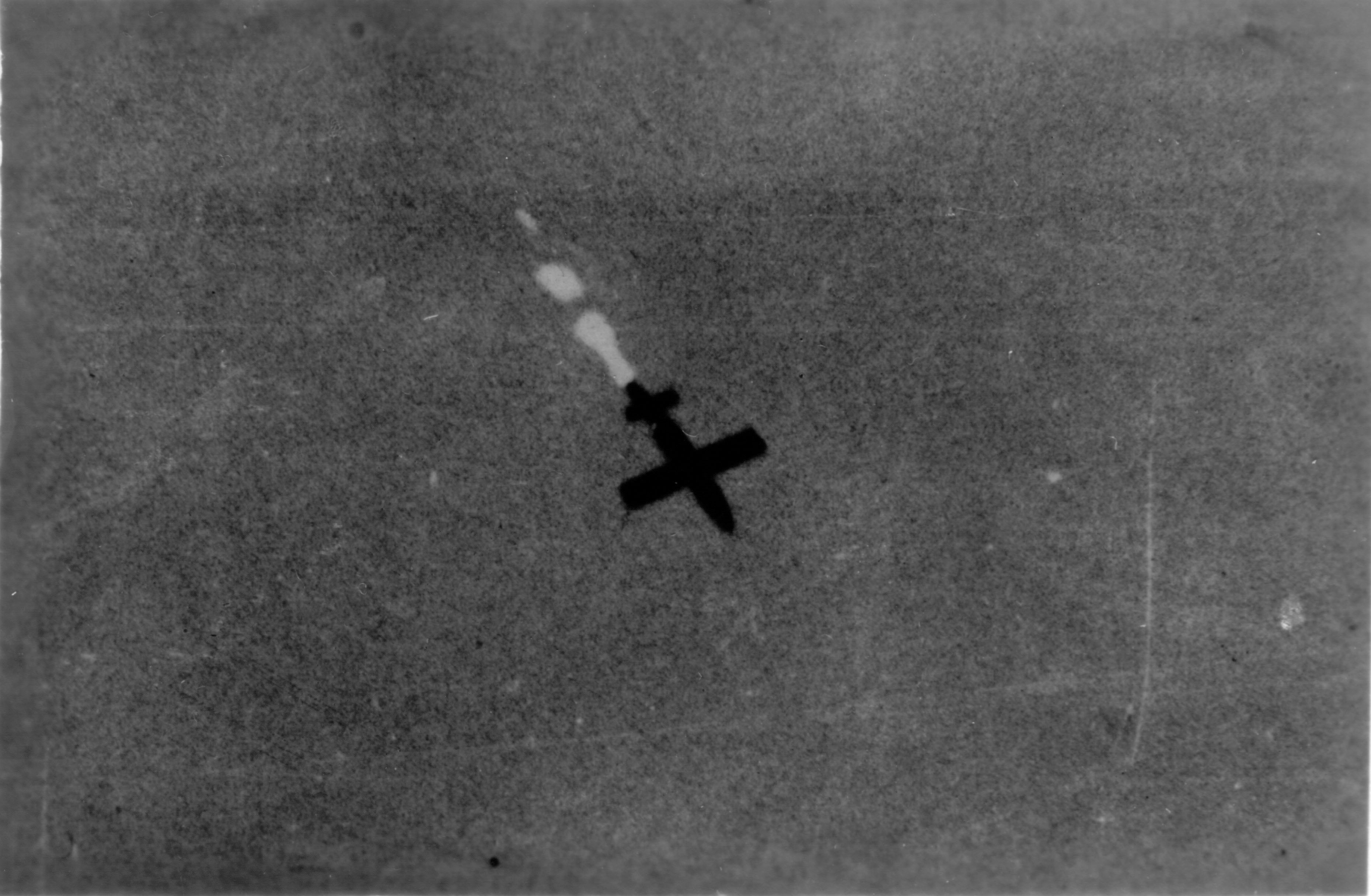
V-1 in flight over Antwerp

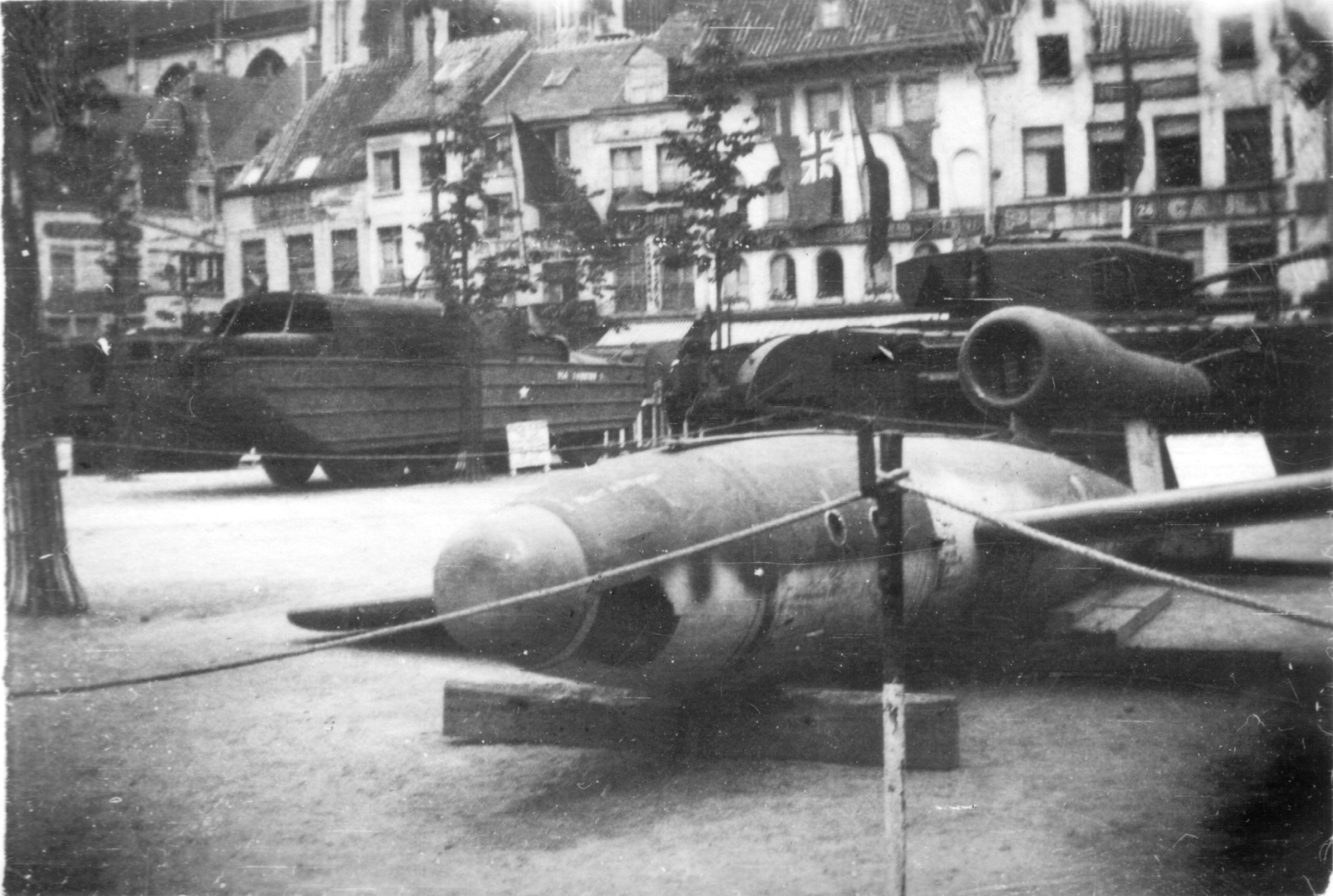
Captured V-1 displayed at Antwerp at the end of World War II.

The air situation was quiet until 21 October, when the Germans began a bombardment of Antwerp and Brussels with V-1 flying bombs. With experience drawn from defending against the V-1 attacks on Southern England (Operation Diver), GHQ AA Troops with 21st Army Group had a contingency plan for this, known as 'X' defences. This involved three lines of warning stations in the path of the V-1 attacks, then heavy AA guns at least 10 miles from the target cities. Searchlights were deployed to aid the guns at night, and to mark the boundaries of the X defence areas to warn off friendly aircraft. British units took responsibility for Brussels, but the two batteries of 42nd S/L Rgt deployed at Antwerp were under the command of the US 50th AA Artillery Brigade.

With experience, the defenders improved their effectiveness: in Christmas week, the Antwerp X defences plotted 209 missiles approaching the city, of which 171 came from directions in which it was safe to employ AA guns; of these 102 were engaged and 61 destroyed. The number of V-1s approaching Antwerp reached a peak of 623 a week in February, but declined thereafter. Overall the defenders' success rate was 43.2 per cent of V-1s destroyed by AA fire, reaching 97.5 per cent in March, after which the launch sites in Germany were overrun. Meanwhile, the Luftwaffe carried out major air raids on the nights of 30/31 December and 31 December/1 January 1945 in connection with Operation Bodenplatte, the attacks on Allied air bases in support of the German Ardennes Offensive. 42 S/L Regiment's lights were heavily involved during the two nights and assisted in the destruction of 5–7 raiders. Although on high alert during the daylight raids, none came close enough to be engaged by the AA light machine guns of the S/L sites.

At the end of January, 368 S/L Bty rejoined the regiment from Ostend, driving through bad winter roads. The regiment returned to British command under 80 AA Bde in February. In the last stages of the war, 42nd S/L Rgt moved into Germany to defend the Rhine bridges against conventional air attack, with 366th Bty still deployed on the South Scheldt estuary. After VE Day the regiment moved to Hamburg to begin occupation duties; in July, 367 S/L Bty was called out to suppress rioting between German and Italian dock workers.

The regiment was placed in suspended animation in 1946.

== Post-War ==
In 1947, the Robin Hoods were reformed in the reconstituted TA as the 577th (The Robin Hoods, Sherwood Foresters) Searchlight Regiment, RA. It formed part of 58 AA Brigade (the pre-war 32nd (North Midland) AA Brigade). Over the next few years, the title varied between 'searchlight' and 'light anti-aircraft' until 1953, when it became 'light anti-aircraft/searchlight'. AA Command was disbanded on 10 March 1955 and there were wholesale merges and amalgamations amongst its regiments. The Robin Hoods amalgamated with the 350th (South Nottinghamshire Hussars Yeomanry) Heavy Regiment, Royal Artillery and 528th Light Anti-Aircraft Regiment (West Nottinghamshire) to form the 350th (The Robin Hood Foresters) Heavy Regiment, RA. The following year Heavy was changed to Light.

In 1961, the regiment converted to engineers and re-titled as the 350 (The Robin Hood Foresters) Field Squadron. In 1967, with reforms of the Armed Forces, it left the RE, returning to the Sherwood Foresters as part of The Robin Hood (Territorial) Battalion, a TAVR III (Territorial and Army Volunteer Reserve) unit. In 1969, the Robin Hoods were reduced to cadre strength when they became the Robin Hood (T) Battalion, The Sherwood Foresters, RE. The Robin Hoods were sponsored by 73 Engineer Regiment, RE. In 1971, with further defence reforms, the Robin Hoods became D (Robin Hood Foresters) Company, 3rd (V) Battalion of the newly formed Worcestershire and Sherwood Foresters Regiment.

In 1992, the Robin Hood lineage was discontinued upon D Company becoming the HQ Company; the company was disbanded in 1999.

== Insignia ==
When the battalion transferred to the RA in August 1940 it was allowed to retain its Robin Hoods cap badge in silver for officers and white metal for other ranks, together with a Rifle green Lanyard instead of the white lanyard normally worn by the RA.

42nd (Robin Hoods) S/L Regiment was cited in a decree of the Belgian government on 8 May 1947 for its heroic part in the defence of Antwerp, and members of its successor regiment were permitted to wear a strip of ribbon of the Belgian Croix de Guerre on each shoulder.

== Honorary Colonel ==
Honorary Colonels of the battalion included:

- William Beauclerk, 10th Duke of St Albans, appointed 13 June 1863, died 10 May 1898
- William Cavendish-Bentinck, 6th Duke of Portland, appointed 21 September 1898
- Colonel George Monckton-Arundell, 8th Viscount Galway, GCMG, DSO, OBE, appointed 21 September February 1933
- Lieutenant-Colonel G.A. Wharton, MBE, TD, appointed 1 April 1967

== Memorials ==
The actions of the 46th (North) Midland Division at the Hohenzollern Redoubt on 13 October 1915 are marked by two memorials. There are other memorials to the battalion at St Mary's Church, Nottingham, and at Nottingham Castle. The main Sherwood Foresters' war memorial is a tower at Crich, high in the Derbyshire Hills.

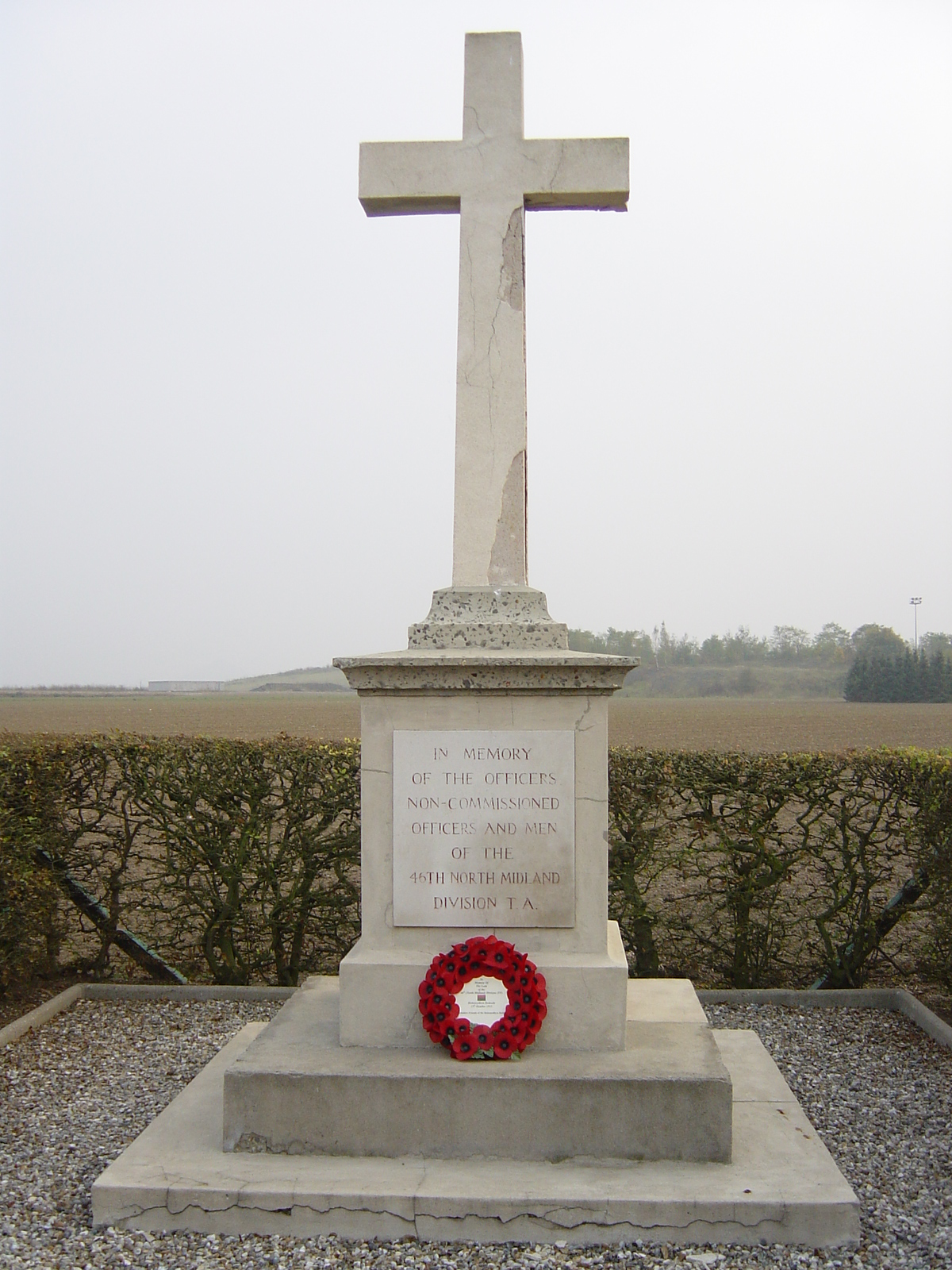
Memorial at Vermelles, starting point for the division's attack on 13 October 1915

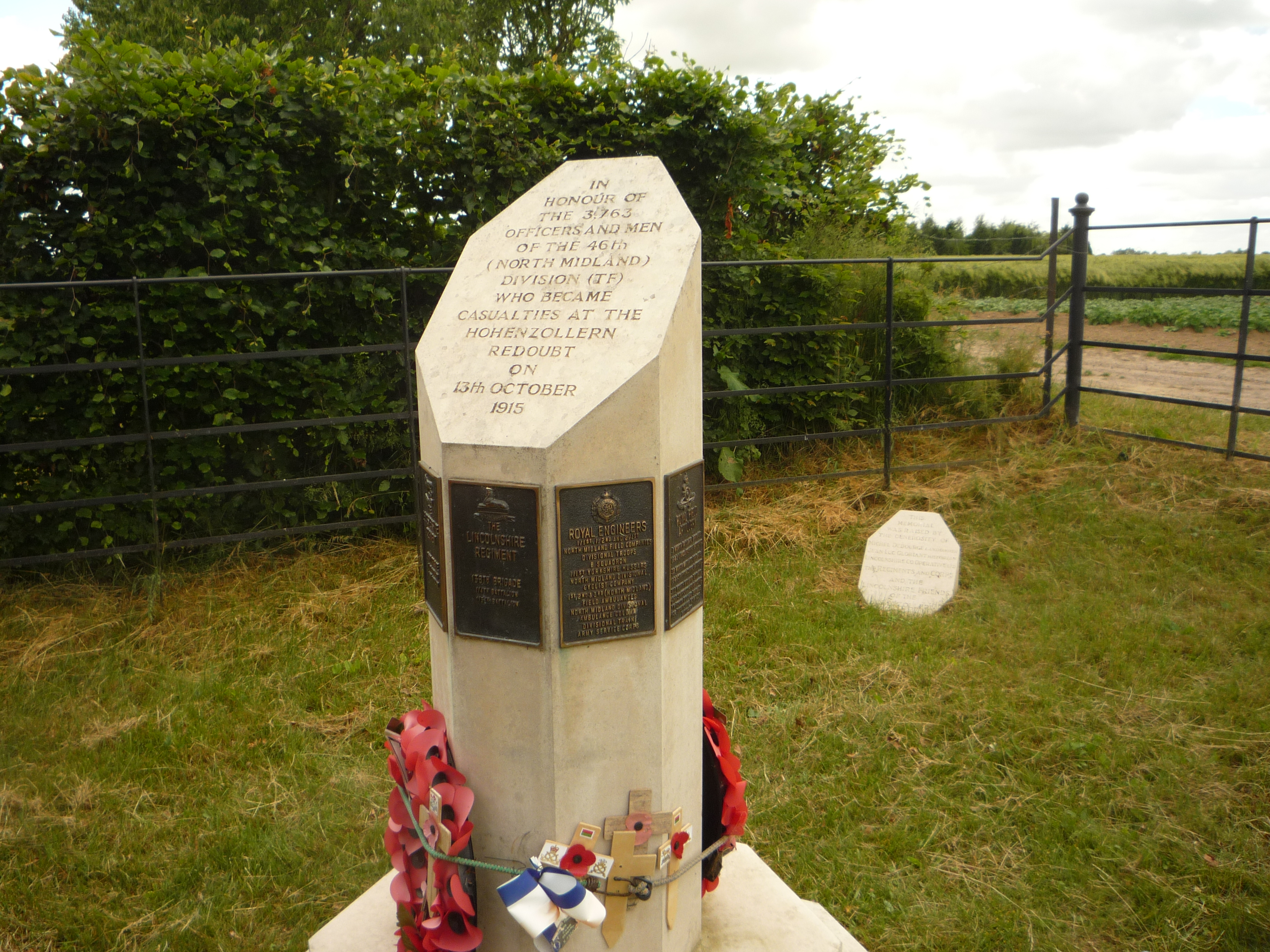
Memorial at Cité de Madagascar, site of the Hohenzollern Redoubt.

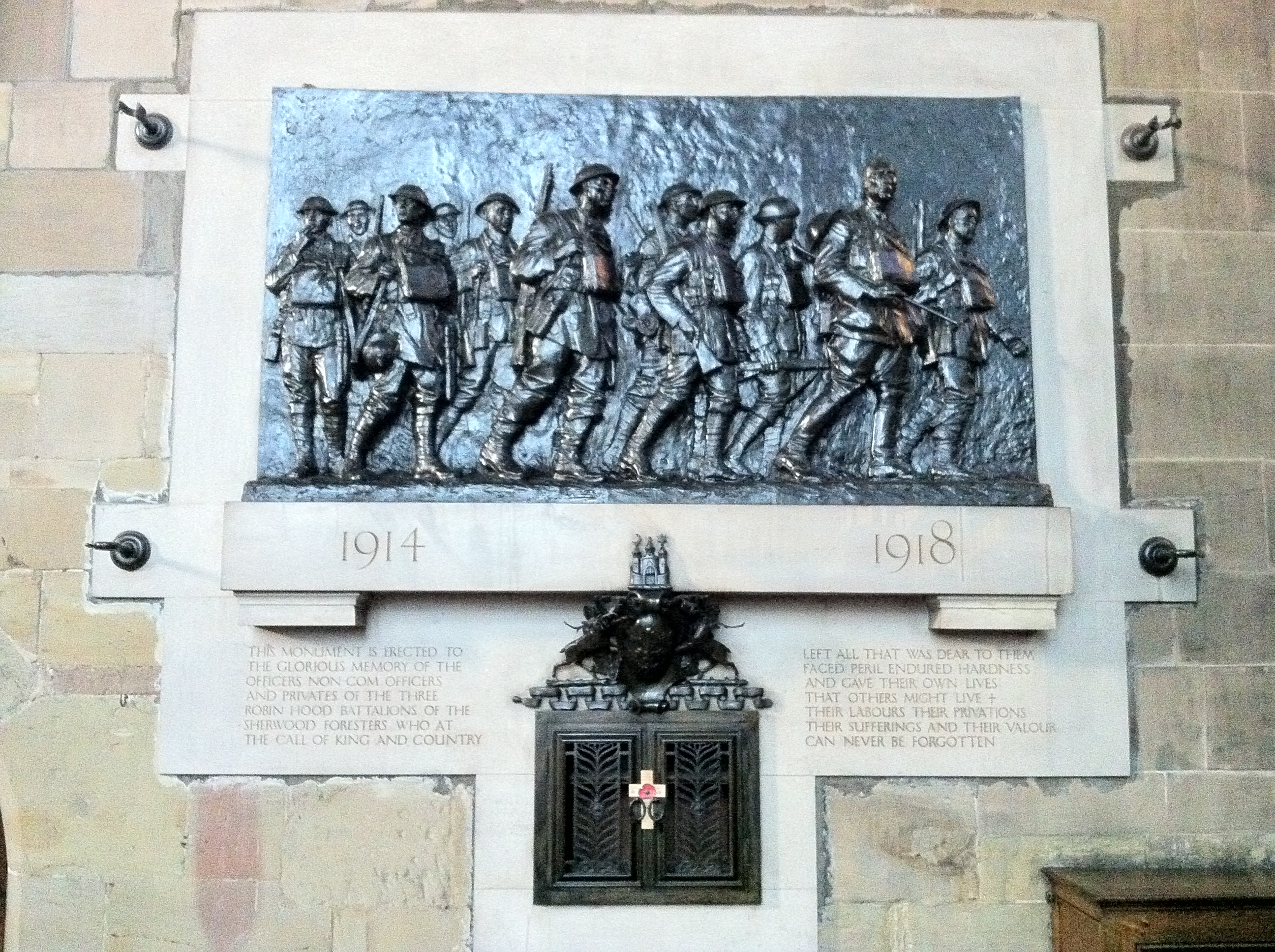
Memorial to the Robin Hood Rifles in St Mary's Church, Nottingham.

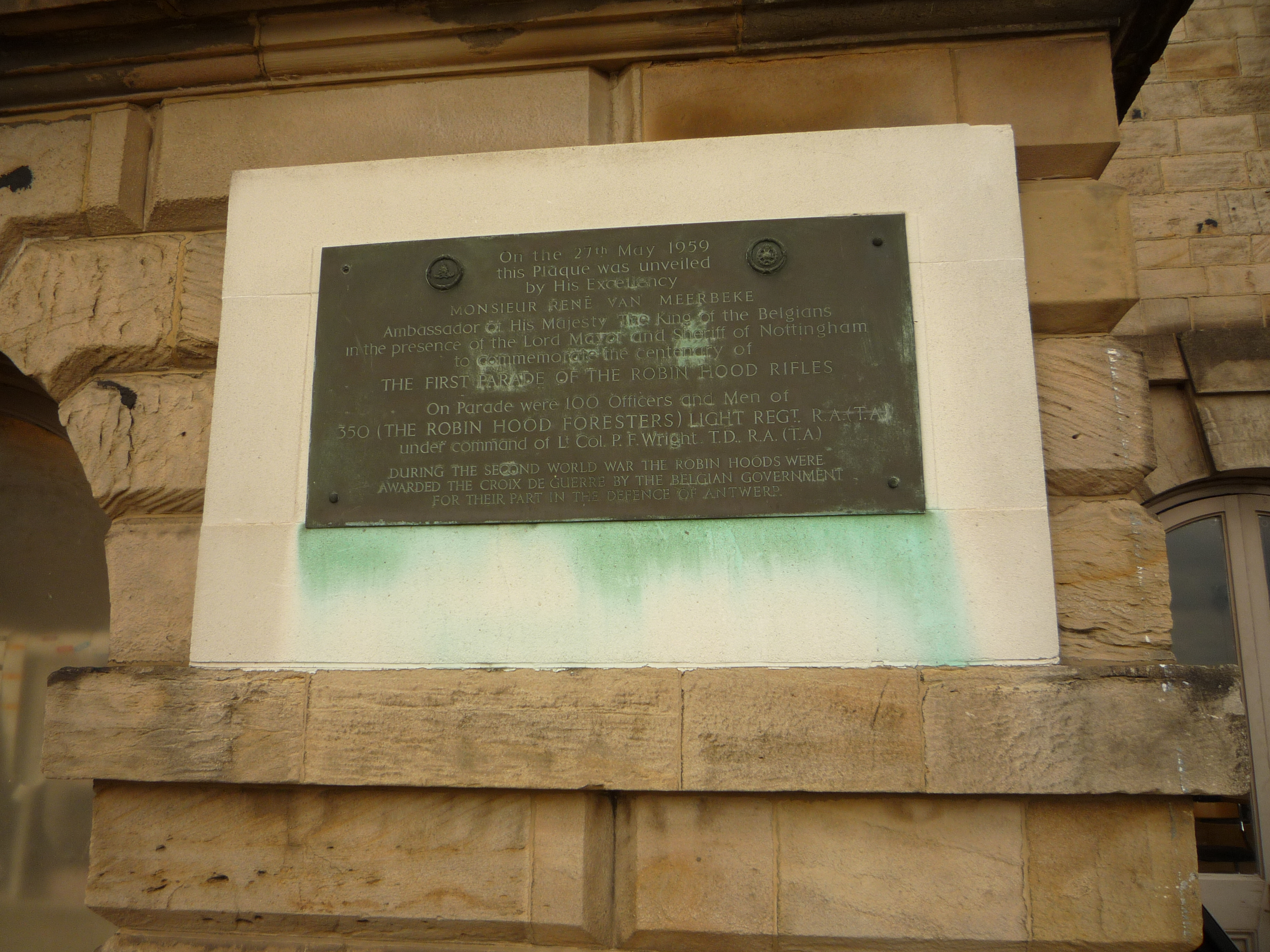
Plaque on the terrace of Nottingham Castle commemorating the centenary of the raising of the Robin Hood Rifles and the award of the Belgian Croix de Guerre.

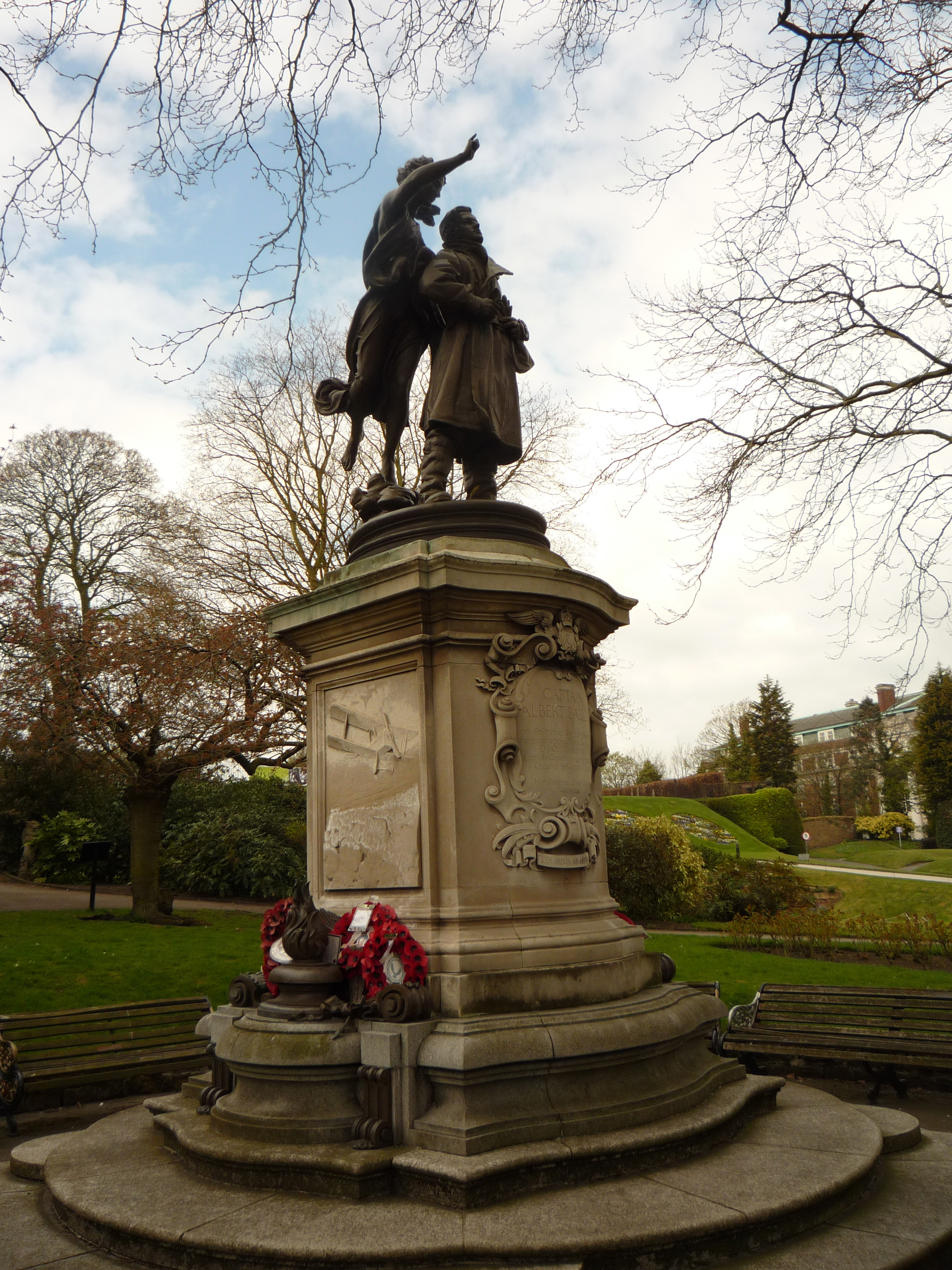
Statue of Albert Ball, VC, in the grounds of Nottingham Castle

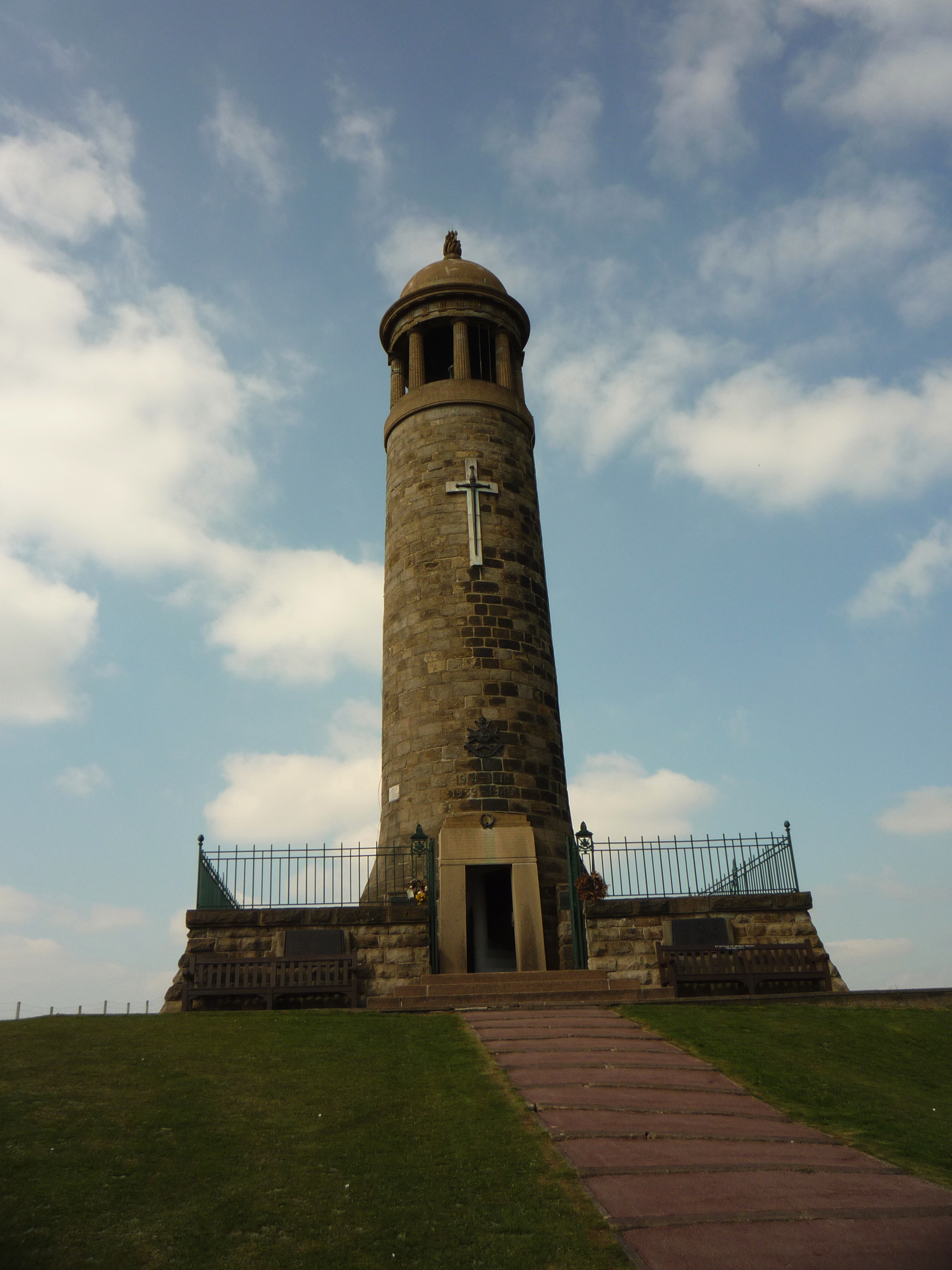
Crich Tower.

== See also ==
- Sherwood Foresters
- Volunteer Force
