= Brian Thompson (footballer, born 1938) =

English footballer

- Born: 1938; Great Gonerby
- Died: 2011 (aged 72–73)
- Alma mater: The King's School
- Occupation: Association football player, market merchant, cricketer

Brian Thompson (1938–2011) was an English goalkeeper, who played for Grantham Town, Loughborough and Peterborough United.

== Biography ==
Thompson's father was a butcher in the village of Great Gonerby. Thompson attended King's School, before obtaining work as a technical draughtsman with Aveling-Barford.

After his football career, he worked as a market trader, and established a fashion business in partnership with his wife, Barbara.

Over the years he played cricket for his school, for the Aveling-Barford works' team, for Wollaton Cricket Club, and, in his 50s, for Nottingham Forest Cricket Club's first eleven, and was described as "very able bowler and batsman".

He ran a nightclub, 'Faces', in Grantham's London Road, and came briefly to national prominence when he organised the Barbeque 67 rock concert, which featured Geno Washington and the Ram Jam Band and The Move, as well as three then litte-known acts: Pink Floyd, The Jimi Hendrix Experience and Cream. The event is the subject of a 2017 play, Barbecue '67 Revisited, based on the concert by the Nottingham-based theatre group 'Excavate'.
