= The King's School, Grantham =

British grammar school

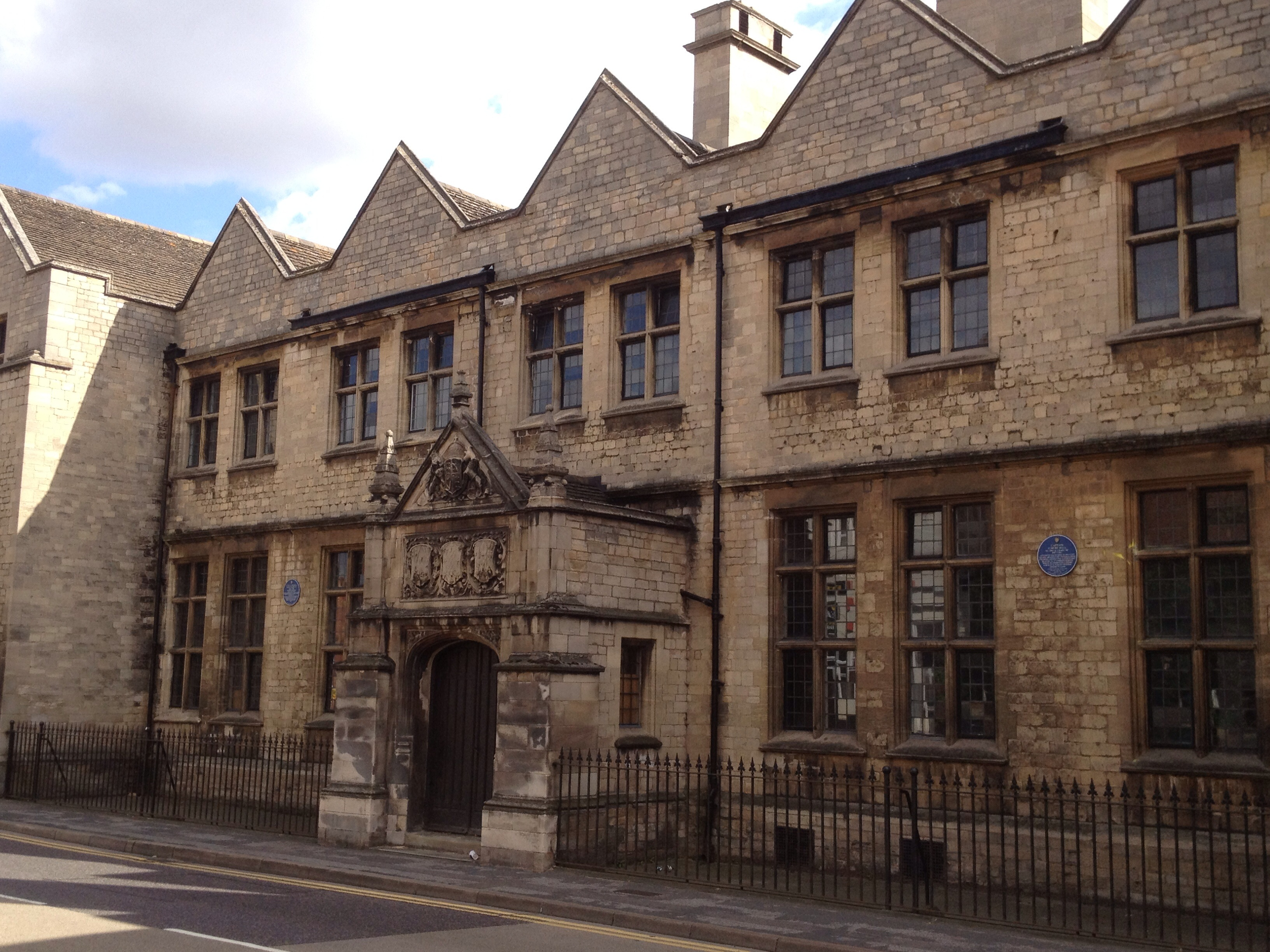
- School badge The King's School, Grantham.

Location
- Brook Street; Grantham, Lincolnshire, NG31 6RP; England; 52.9156°N 0.6409°W

Information
- Type: 11–18 boys Grammar school; Academy
- Motto: Honi soit qui mal y pense (Shame on anyone who thinks evil of it)
- Established: 1329; 697 years ago
- Department for Education URN: 137166 Tables
- Ofsted: Reports
- Headmaster: Simon Pickett
- Staff: 90
- Gender: Boys
- Age: 11 to 18
- Enrolment: 1216
- Houses: Burleigh (Blue); Curteis (Red); Foxe (Yellow); More (White); Newton (Green); School (Black)
Colour
- Publication: The Granthamian
- Website: www.kings.lincs.sch.uk

The King's School is an 11–18 boys grammar school with academy status, in the market town of Grantham, Lincolnshire, England. The school's history can be traced to 1329, and was re-endowed by Richard Foxe in 1528. Located on Brook Street, the school's site has expanded over the course of its history, with some school buildings dating back to 1497.

Today, King's remains an all-boys grammar school, with just over 1,000 pupils. King's and another Grantham grammar school, Kesteven and Grantham Girls' School, share teaching resources for sixth form study in certain subjects; since 2006–2007, timetables for this study have been co-ordinated between both schools.

== History ==
=== Establishment ===
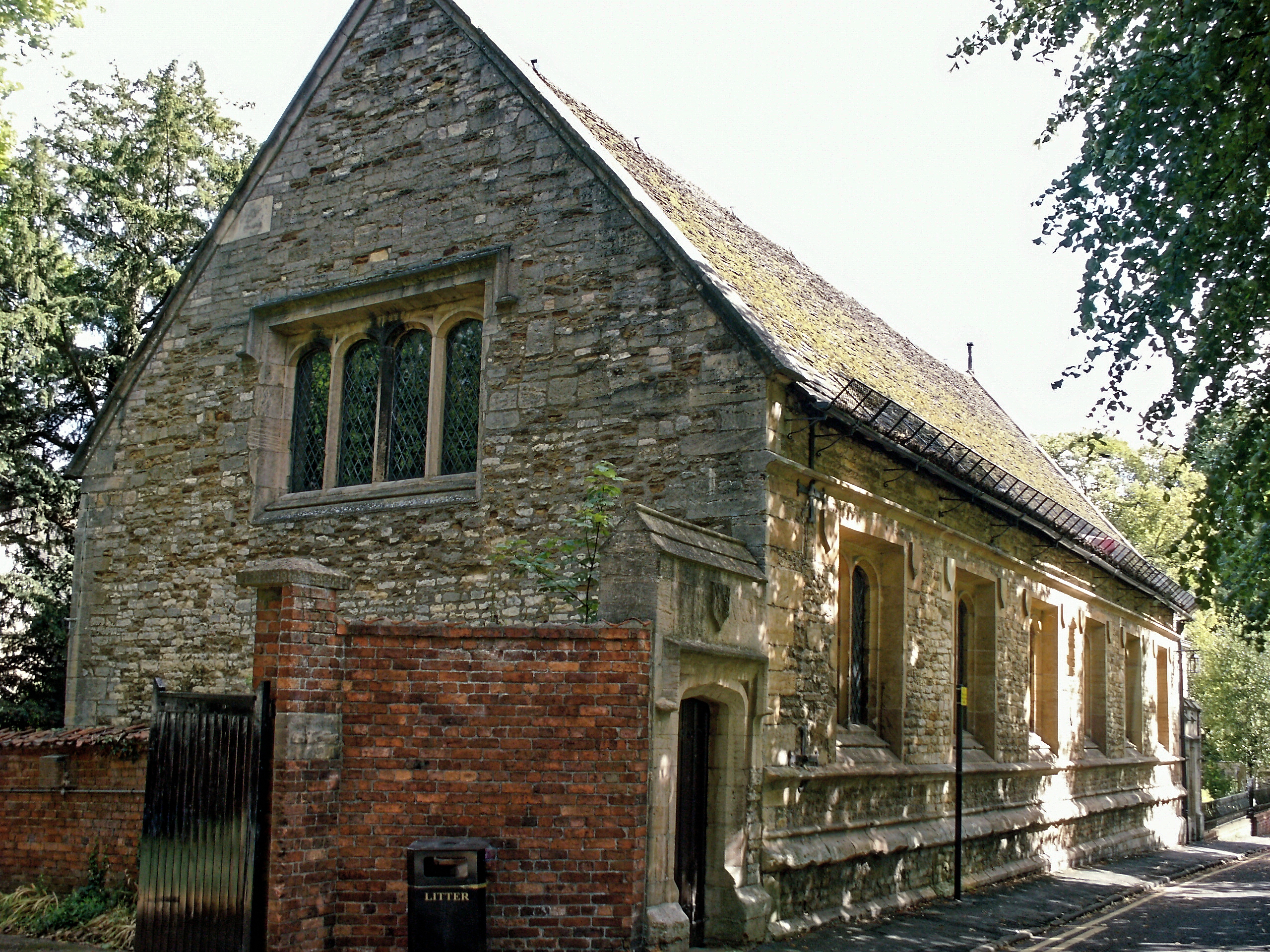
The oldest King's School building

The King's School has an unbroken history on the same site since its re-endowment in 1528 by Richard Foxe, although its history can be traced back to 1329. In Sir Nikolaus Pevsner's Buildings of England, he dates the oldest surviving school building (pictured) to about 1497. Foxe was born and raised locally. He entered the service of Henry Tudor, later Henry VII, while he was in exile in Brittany. When Henry took the throne of England, Foxe became his secretary, and he later founded Corpus Christi College, Oxford (1517) and Taunton Grammar School (1522). In the 16th century, the School became known as the Free Grammar School of King Edward VI. Scholars numbered perhaps a few dozen at foundation, and there were still fewer than one hundred until the 20th century.

Isaac Newton was a King's School scholar between 1655 and 1660. As was customary in his time, he carved his signature on the wall of what is now the school library, although the signature has never been confirmed as authentic; visitors from around the world come to view this indication of Newton's education. A replica of the signature is on display in Grantham Museum.

=== Selective grammar ===
The school became a selective state grammar school under the implementation of the Education Act 1944. By 1970, Kesteven County Council announced plans to turn its grammar schools into co-educational comprehensives for ages of 11–16 and leave Grantham College as the town's only sixth form. Other parts of Kesteven became comprehensive but responsibility for education passed to Lincolnshire County Council under the Local Government Act 1972, and King's remained a grammar school.

The novelist and eccentric Frederick Rolfe ('Baron Corvo') was briefly a teacher at the school.

=== Recent history ===
In 1988 an illustrated history of the School was published by a former King's School teacher: The King's School Grantham – 660 years of a Grammar School.

On 1 August 2011 The King's School ended its long relationship with the local elected authorities and the town of Grantham, by converting to a selective academy. It remains a selective boys' school and has kept its name and logo.

== Overview ==
=== Curriculum ===
The school provides subjects that are traditional in range, providing curriculum subjects with breadth, depth and challenge at each Key Stage throughout the school. Boys attending the school are provided with opportunities to partake in extracurricular and academic experiences such as in sports, music, art, drama, chess, the Duke of Edinburgh award scheme and languages. Additionally, the school offers a range of lunchtime and after school clubs to enhance boys' learning experiences such as the Combined Cadet Force (CCF). Boys may also wish to partake in a programme of visits and trips overseas with the school.

Form tutors support the progress and wellbeing of boys throughout the school year, together with subject staff and Heads of Year staff at the school. Subjects offered by the school include Art, Business, Computing, Drama, English, French, History, Music, Physical Education (PE), Politics, Religious Education (RE), Biology, Chemistry, Design and Technology, Economics, Financial Studies, Geography, Mathematics, Physics, Psychology, Science and PSHE Curriculum.

=== Academic attainment ===
King's boys generally take ten to eleven General Certificate of Secondary Education (GCSE) examinations in Year Eleven (aged 15–16), and they have a choice of three or four A-levels in the sixth form. An Office for Standards in Education, Children's Services and Skills (Ofsted) inspection in May 2008 graded The King's School as "outstanding". The majority of students go on to higher education following the completion of their A-levels at the end of Year Thirteen (aged 17–18), and it is common for several boys to gain Oxbridge offers.

=== School uniform ===
A school uniform is in place at The King's School. The current uniform for boys at the school is as follows:

- Black blazer with school badge
- Formal, white school shirt
- Black or dark grey, long school trousers
- School tie
- Dark grey or black socks
- Black school shoes (not suede material, boots and trainers are forbidden)
- Grey school pullover jumper with maroon stripe, or;
- Plain grey v-neck pullover jumper

The school expects all students to be "clean, neat and tidy in their appearance", with an expectation to be wearing full school uniform while at school and also while traveling to and from it and when representing it at occasions outside the school buildings and grounds. More specifically, boys are expected to have their shirts tucked in to their school trousers and to have clean, well groomed, naturally-colored hair.

== Notable former pupils ==
=== 16th and 17th centuries ===
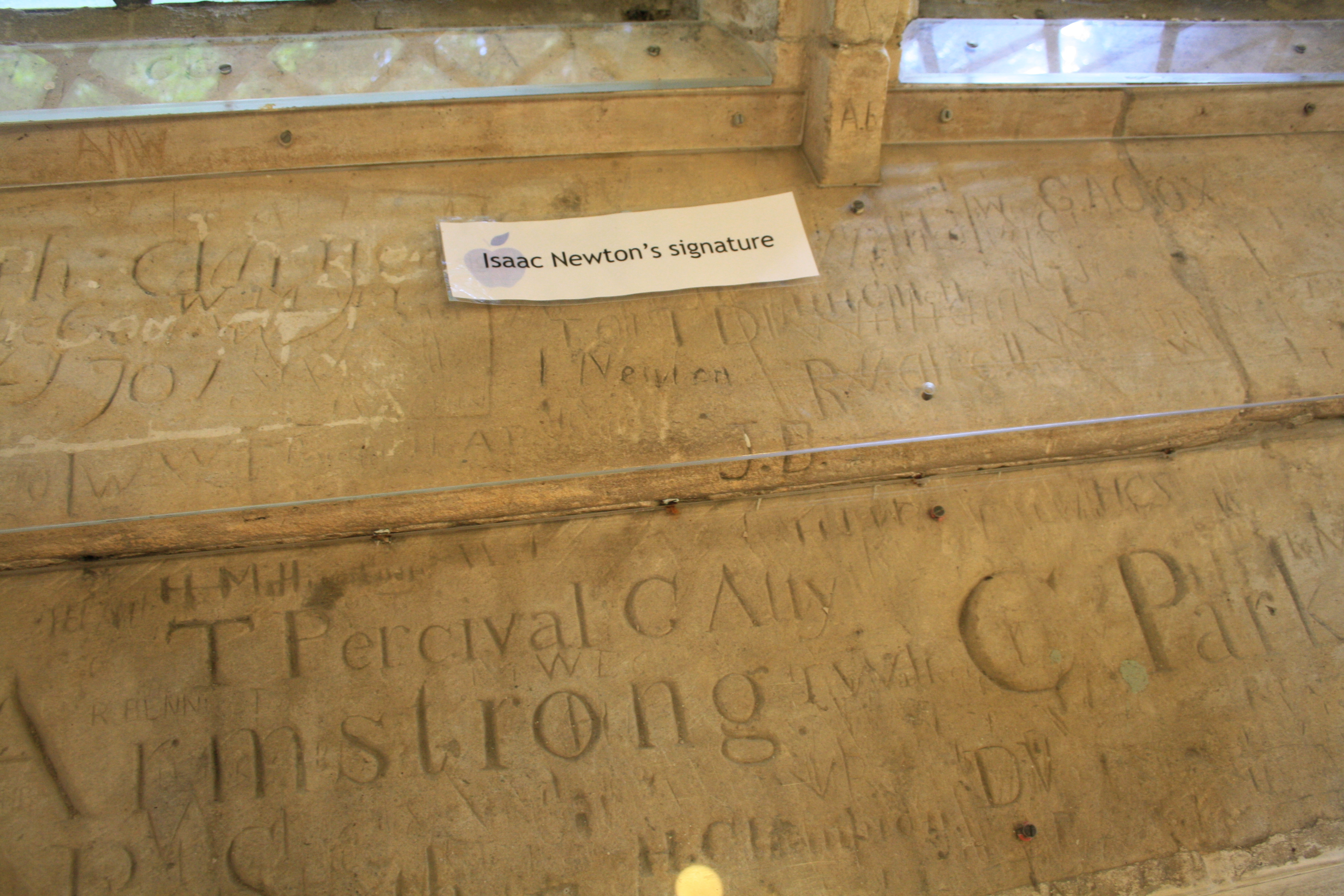
Newton's signature in the original King's School building

- William Cecil (statesman) (1530s)
- Ralph Robinson (1520–1577), English scholar who translated Sir Thomas More's Utopia
- John Still (1543–1607/8), Bishop of Bath and Wells
- Henry More (philosopher) (c. 1620s)
- Isaac Newton (scientist) (1655–1659)
- Arthur Storer (1645–1687), astronomer and mathematician
- Colley Cibber (playwright and poetaster) (1682–1687)
- John Newcome (Cambridge don)

=== 18th and 19th centuries ===
- Sir John Cust (1718-1770) Speaker of the House of Commons
- Peregrine Cust (1723–1785), merchant and politician
- Francis Cust (1722–1791), lawyer and politician
- Frederic Barker (1808–1882), Anglican bishop of Sydney
- Charles Bell (1846–1899), architect
- John Richard de Capel Wise (1831–1890), writer and natural historian
- Sir William Tindal Robertson (1825–1889), physician and politician

=== 20th and 21st centuries ===
- George Mowbray (1847–1910), Mayor of Tulsa
- Sir James McCraith (1853–1928), lawyer and politician
- Bernard Smith (1881–1936), geologist
- Joseph Tombs (1887–1966), VC
- William Wand (1885–1977), Archbishop of Brisbane and Bishop of London
- Captain Albert Ball (1896–1917), VC DSO MC (World War I Flying Ace)
- Lionel Charles Knights (1906–1997), English literary critic
- Alex Sears (born 1989), English former first-class cricketer
- Andy Bond (born 1965), former Asda COO
- Andy Clarke (born 1964), former Asda CEO
- Brian Thompson (1938–2011), footballer and concert promoter
- Oliver Anderson (1912–1996), author of the novel Rotten Borough
- Ben Everitt (born 1979), MP for Milton Keynes North
- Colin Pask (born 1943), British mathematical physicist and science writer
- Air Vice Marshal Gary Waterfall CBE (born 1967), Senior RAF Officer, Chief of Staff (Operations) Permanent Joint Headquarters
- Jason Lai (born 1974), orchestral conductor and TV presenter
- Mark A. O'Neill (born 1959), English computational biologist
- Norman Shrapnel (1912–2004), English journalist, author, and parliamentary correspondent
- Philip Knights (1920–2014), Chief Constable of West Midlands Police
- Johnny Haddon Downes (1920–2004), television producer
- Michael Garner (born 1954), actor
- Sir Vernon Gibson (born 1958) former Chief Scientific Adviser at the Ministry of Defence
- Paul Wallace (born 1958), British former racing driver
- Ross Edgley (born 1985), British athlete, ultra-marathon sea swimmer and author
- Tug Wilson (1938–1993), English rugby union international
- Paul Bieniasz (born 1968), virologist

== See also ==
- List of the oldest schools in the United Kingdom
