= Alex Sears =

English cricketer

Personal information
- Full name: Alexander David Sears
- Born: 17 December 1989 (age 36); Grantham, Lincolnshire, England
- Batting: Right-handed
- Bowling: Right-arm fast-medium

Domestic team information
- Years: Team
- 2014: Cambridge University

Career statistics
Competition	First-class
Matches	1
Runs scored	29
Batting average	29.00
100s/50s	–/–
Top score	29
Balls bowled	254
Wickets	8
Bowling average	15.25
5 wickets in innings	1
10 wickets in match	–
Best bowling	5/73
Catches/stumpings	–/–
- Source: Cricinfo, 13 January 2022

Alexander David Sears (born 17 December 1989) is an English former first-class cricketer.

Sears was born at Grantham in December 1989. He was educated at The King's School in Grantham, before going up to Homerton College, Cambridge. While studying at Cambridge, he made a single appearance in first-class cricket for Cambridge University Cricket Club against Oxford University in the 2014 University Match at Oxford. Batting once in the match, he was dismissed for 29 runs in the Cambridge first innings by Abidine Sakande. In the Oxford first innings he took a five wicket haul with his fast-medium bowling, with figures of 5 for 73. He followed this up in their second innings with figures of 3 for 49.
