= Albert Ball =

Recipient of the Victoria Cross, British WWI flying ace

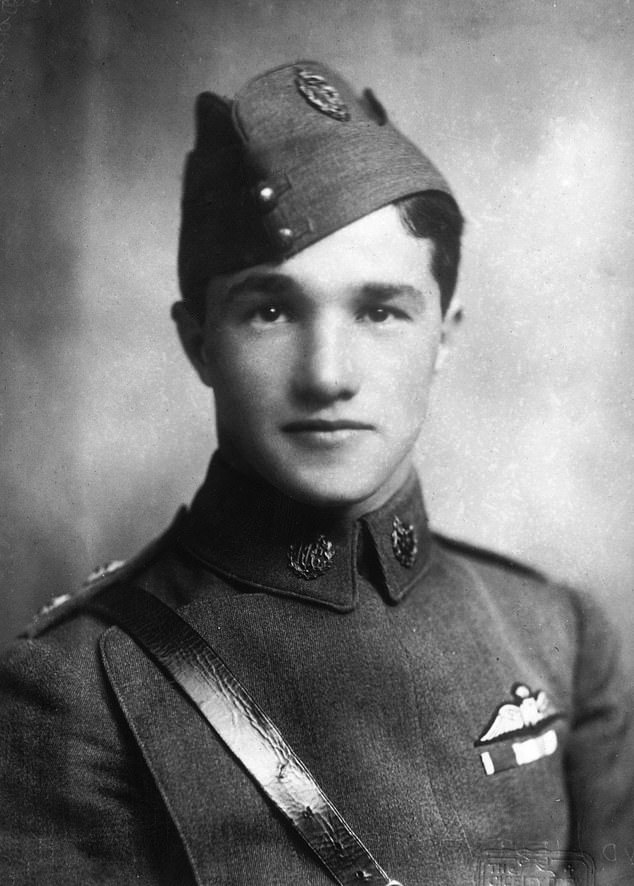
- Born: 14 August 1896; Nottingham, England
- Died: 7 May 1917 (aged 20); Annœullin, France
- Burial place: Grave 643, Annœullin Communal Cemetery, German Extension
- Relatives: Sir Albert Ball (father)
- Military career
- Allegiance: United Kingdom
- Branch: British Army (1914–15); Royal Flying Corps (1915–17)
- Service years: 1914–17
- Rank: Captain
- Units: Sherwood Foresters (1914–15); No. 9 Squadron RFC (1915–16); No. 13 Squadron RFC (1916); No. 11 Squadron RFC (1916, twice); No. 8 Squadron RFC (1916); No. 60 Squadron RFC (1916); No. 34 Squadron RFC (1916–17); No. 56 Squadron RFC (1917)
- Conflicts: First World War; Western Front †; Home Front
- Awards: Victoria Cross; Distinguished Service Order & Two Bars; Military Cross; Légion d'honneur (France); Order of St. George (Russia)

Albert Ball, VC, DSO & Two Bars, MC (14 August 1896 – 7 May 1917) was a British fighter pilot during the First World War. At the time of his death he was the United Kingdom's leading flying ace, with 44 victories, and remained its fourth-highest scorer behind Edward Mannock, James McCudden and George McElroy.

Born and raised in Nottingham, Ball joined the Sherwood Foresters at the outbreak of the First World War and was commissioned as a second lieutenant in October 1914. He transferred to the Royal Flying Corps (RFC) the following year, and gained his pilot's wings on 26 January 1916. Joining No. 13 Squadron RFC in France, he flew reconnaissance missions before being posted in May to No. 11 Squadron, a fighter unit. From then until his return to England on leave in October, he accrued many aerial victories, earning two Distinguished Service Orders and the Military Cross. He was the first ace to become a British national hero.

After a period on home establishment, Ball was posted to No. 56 Squadron, which deployed to the Western Front in April 1917. He died when his plane crashed into a field in France on 7 May, sparking a wave of national mourning and posthumous recognition, which included the award of the Victoria Cross for his actions during his final tour of duty. The famous German flying ace Manfred von Richthofen remarked upon hearing of Ball's death that he was "by far the best English flying man".

== Early life and education ==
Albert Ball was born on 14 August 1896 at a house on Lenton Boulevard in Lenton, Nottingham. After a series of moves throughout the area, his family settled at Sedgley in Lenton Road. His parents were Albert Ball, a successful businessman who rose from employment as a plumber to become Lord Mayor of Nottingham, and who was later knighted, and Harriett Mary Page. Albert had two siblings, a brother and a sister. His parents were considered loving and indulgent. In his youth, Ball had a small hut behind the family house where he tinkered with engines and electrical equipment. He was raised with a knowledge of firearms, and conducted target practice in Sedgley's gardens. Possessed of keen vision, he soon became a crack shot. He was also deeply religious. This did not curb his daring in such boyhood pursuits as steeplejacking; on his 16th birthday, he accompanied a local workman to the top of a tall factory chimney and strolled about unconcerned by the height.

Ball studied at the Lenton Church School, The King's School, Grantham and Nottingham High School before transferring to Trent College in January 1911, at the age of 14. As a student he displayed only average ability, but was able to develop his curiosity for things mechanical. His best subjects were carpentry, modelling, violin and photography. He also served in the Officers' Training Corps. When Albert left school in December 1913, aged 17, his father helped him gain employment at Universal Engineering Works near the family home.

== First World War ==
=== Initial war service ===
Following the outbreak of the First World War in August 1914, Ball enlisted in the British Army, joining the 2/7th (Robin Hood) Battalion of the Sherwood Foresters (Nottinghamshire and Derbyshire Regiment). Soon promoted to sergeant, he gained his commission as a second lieutenant on 29 October. He was assigned to training recruits, but this rear-echelon role annoyed him. In an attempt to see action, he transferred early the following year to the North Midlands Cyclist Company, Divisional Mounted Troops, but remained confined to a posting in England. On 24 February 1915, he wrote to his parents, "I have just sent five boys to France, and I hear that they will be in the firing line on Monday. It is just my luck to be unable to go."

In March 1915, Ball began a short-lived engagement to Dorothy (Dot) Elbourne. In June, he decided to take private flying lessons at Hendon Aerodrome, which would give him an outlet for his interest in engineering and possibly help him to see action in France sooner. He paid to undertake pilot training in his own time at the Ruffy-Baumann School, which charged £75 to £100 for instruction (£5,580 to £7,440 in 2010 prices).

Ball would wake at 3:00 am to ride his motorcycle to Ruffy-Baumann for flying practice at dawn, before beginning his daily military duty at 6:45 am. His training at Ruffy-Baumann was not unique; Edwin Cole was learning to fly there at the same time. In letters home Ball recorded that he found flying "great sport", and displayed what Peter de la Billière described as "almost brutal" detachment regarding accidents suffered by his fellow trainees:

Yesterday a ripping boy had a smash, and when we got up to him he was nearly dead, he had a two-inch piece of wood right through his head and died this morning. If you would like a flight I should be pleased to take you any time you wish.

=== Military flight training and reconnaissance work ===
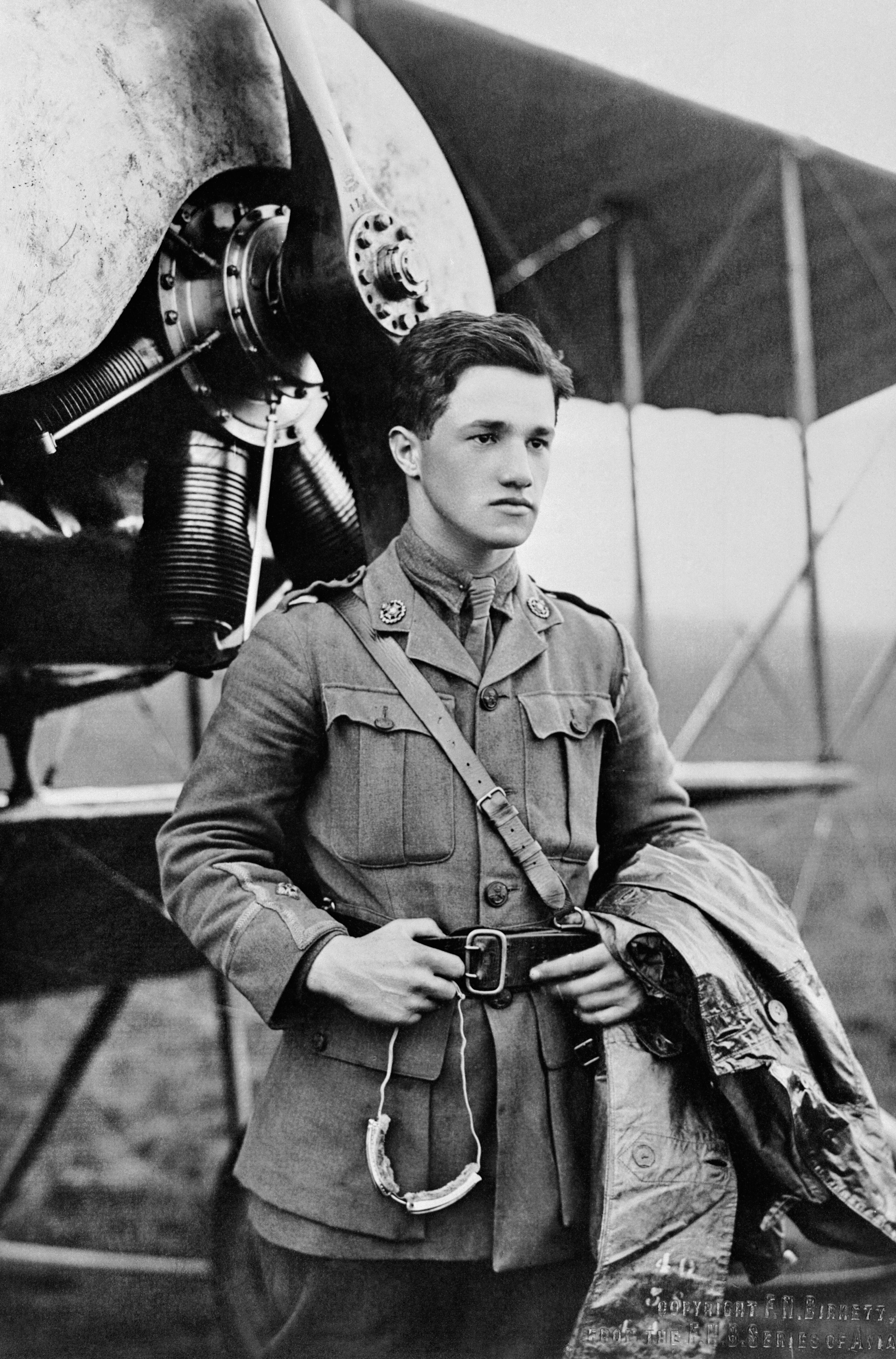
Ball with an obsolete Caudron G.3, widely used as a trainer in 1915–16

Although considered an average pilot at best by his instructors, Ball qualified for his Royal Aero Club certificate (no. 1898) on 15 October 1915, and promptly requested transfer to the Royal Flying Corps (RFC). He was seconded to No. 9 (Reserve) Squadron RFC on 23 October, and trained at Mousehold Heath aerodrome near Norwich. In the first week of December, he soloed in a Maurice Farman Longhorn after standing duty all night, and his touchdown was rough. When his instructor commented sarcastically on the landing, Ball angrily exclaimed that he had only 15 minutes experience in the plane, and that if this was the best instruction he was going to get, he would rather return to his old unit. The instructor relented, and Ball then soloed again and landed successfully in five consecutive flights. His rough landing was not the last Ball was involved in; he survived two others. He completed his training at Central Flying School, Upavon, and was awarded his wings on 22 January 1916. A week later, he was officially transferred from the North Midlands Cyclist Company to the RFC as a pilot.

On 18 February 1916, Ball joined No. 13 Squadron RFC at Marieux in France, flying a two-seat Royal Aircraft Factory B.E.2c on reconnaissance missions. He survived being shot down by anti-aircraft fire on 27 March. Three days later, he fought the first of several combats in the B.E.2; he and his observer, Lieutenant S. A. Villiers, fired a drum and a half of Lewis gun ammunition at an enemy two-seater, but were driven off by a second one. After this inconclusive skirmish, Ball wrote home in one of his many letters, "I like this job, but nerves do not last long, and you soon want a rest". In letters home to his father, he discouraged the idea of his younger brother following him into the RFC. Ball and Villiers tried unsuccessfully to shoot down an enemy observation balloon in their two-seater on 10 April. Ball's burgeoning skills and aggressiveness gained him access to the squadron's single-seat Bristol Scout fighter later that month. April 1916 also saw Ball's first mention in a letter home of plans for "a most wonderful machine ... heaps better than the Hun Fokker". It is now generally believed that these "plans" were unconnected with the design of the Austin-Ball A.F.B.1, with which he later became involved.

=== Initial fighter posting ===
On 7 May 1916, Ball was posted to No. 11 Squadron, which operated a mix of fighters including Bristol Scouts, Nieuport 16s and Royal Aircraft Factory F.E.2b "pushers". After his first day of flying with his new unit, he wrote a letter home complaining about fatigue. He was unhappy with the hygiene of his assigned billet in the nearest village, and elected to live in a tent on the flight line. Ball built a hut for himself to replace the tent and cultivated a garden.

Throughout his flying service Ball was primarily a "lone-wolf" pilot, stalking his prey from below until he drew close enough to use his top-wing Lewis gun on its Foster mounting, angled to fire upwards into the enemy's fuselage. According to fellow ace and Victoria Cross recipient James McCudden, "it was quite a work of art to pull this gun down and shoot upwards, and at the same time manage one's machine accurately". Ball was as much a loner on the ground as in the air, preferring to stay in his hut on the flight line away from other squadron members. His off-duty hours were spent tending his small garden and practising the violin. Though not unsociable per se, he was extremely sensitive and shy. Ball acted as his own mechanic on his aircraft and, as a consequence, was often untidy and dishevelled. His singularity in dress extended to his habit of flying without a helmet and goggles, and he wore his thick black hair longer than regulations generally permitted.

While flying a Bristol Scout on 16 May 1916, Ball scored his first aerial victory, driving down a German reconnaissance aircraft. He then switched to Nieuports, bringing down two LVGs on 29 May and a Fokker Eindecker on 1 June. On 25 June he became a balloon buster and an ace by destroying an observation balloon with phosphor bombs. During the month he had written to his parents admonishing them to try and "take it well" if he was killed, "for men tons better than I go in hundreds every day". He again achieved two victories in one sortie on 2 July, shooting down a Roland C.II and an Aviatik to bring his score to seven.

Ball then requested a few days off but, to his dismay, was temporarily reassigned to aerial reconnaissance duty with No. 8 Squadron, where he flew B.E.2s from 18 July until 14 August. During this posting, Ball undertook an unusual mission. On the evening of 28 July, he flew a French espionage agent across enemy lines. Dodging an attack by three German fighters, as well as anti-aircraft fire, he landed in a deserted field, only to find that the agent refused to get out of the aircraft. While he was on reconnaissance duties with No. 8 Squadron, the London Gazette announced that he had been awarded the Military Cross "for conspicuous skill and gallantry on many occasions," particularly for "one occasion [when] he attacked six in one flight". This was not unusual; throughout his career, Ball generally attacked on sight and heedless of the odds. He professed no hatred for his opponents, writing to his parents "I only scrap because it is my duty ... Nothing makes me feel more rotten than to see them go down, but you see it is either them or me, so I must do my duty best to make it a case of them".

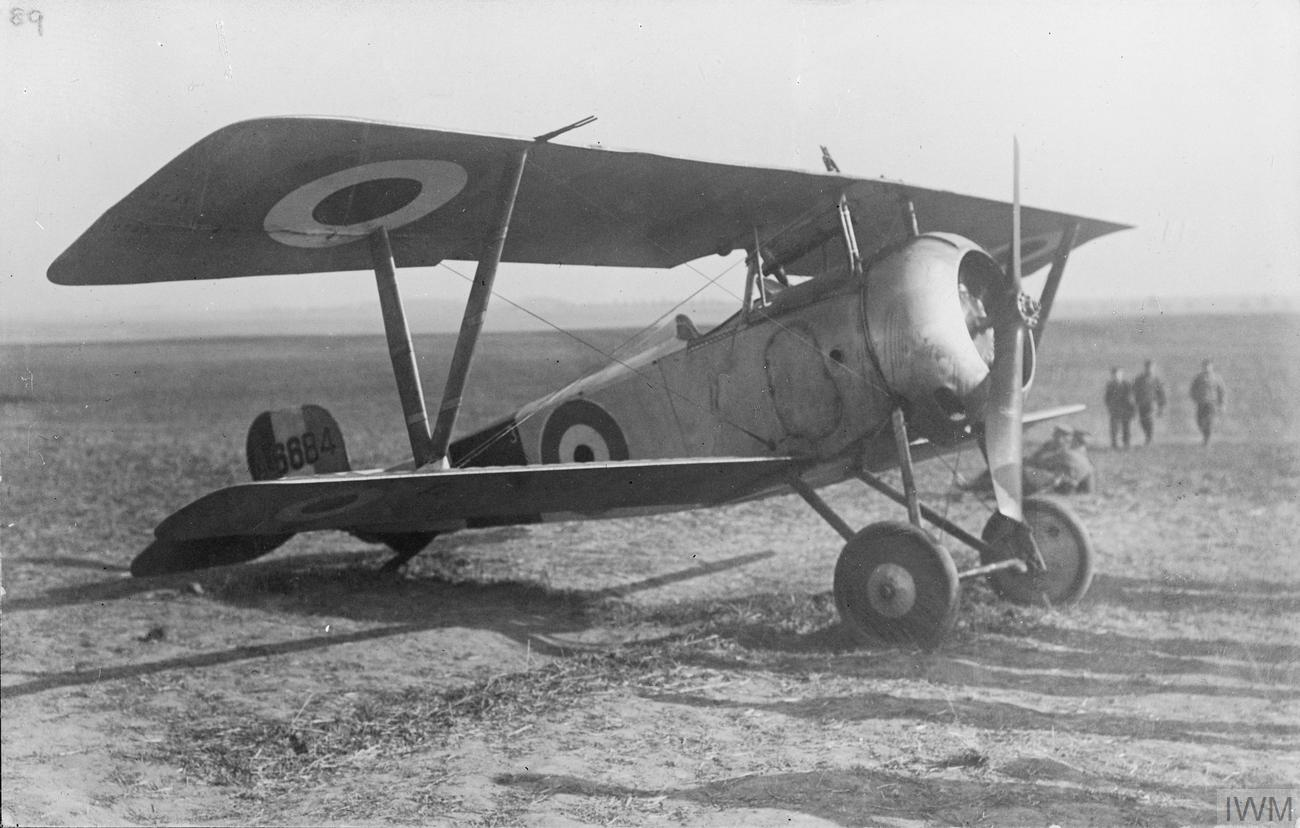
Nieuport 17, a type flown by Ball in No. 60 Squadron

Ball's 20th birthday was marked by his promotion to temporary captain and his return to No. 11 Squadron. He destroyed three Roland C.IIs in one sortie on 22 August 1916, the first RFC pilot to do so. He ended the day by fighting 14 Germans some 15 miles (24 km) behind their lines. With his aircraft badly damaged and out of fuel, he struggled back to Allied lines to land. He transferred with part of No. 11 Squadron to No. 60 Squadron RFC on 23 August. His new commanding officer gave Ball a free rein to fly solo missions, and assigned him his own personal aircraft and maintenance crew. One of the squadron mechanics painted up a non-standard red propeller boss; A201 became the first of a series of Ball's aeroplanes to have such a colour scheme. He found that it helped his fellow squadron members identify his aircraft and confirm his combat claims. By end of the month, he had increased his tally to 17 enemy aircraft, including three on 28 August.

Ball then took leave in England. His feats in France had received considerable publicity. He was the first British ace to become a household name, and found that his celebrity was such that he could not walk down the streets of Nottingham without being stopped and congratulated. Prior to this the British government had suppressed the names of its aces—in contrast to the policy of the French and Germans—but the losses of the Battle of the Somme, which had commenced in July, made politic the publicising of its successes in the air. Ball's achievements had a profound impact on budding flyer Mick Mannock, who would become the United Kingdom's top-scoring ace and also receive the Victoria Cross.

Upon return to No. 60 Squadron in France, Ball scored morning and evening victories on 15 September, flying two different Nieuports. On the evening mission, he armed his aircraft with eight Le Prieur rockets, fitted to the outer struts and designed to fire electrically. He intended to use them on an observation balloon. As it happened, he spotted three German Roland C.IIs and broke their formation by salvoing his rockets at them, then picked off one of the pilots with machine-gun fire. After this he settled into an improved aeroplane, Nieuport 17 A213. He had it rigged to fly tail-heavy to facilitate his changing of ammunition drums in the machine-gun, and had a holster built into the cockpit for the Colt automatic pistol that he habitually carried. Three times during September he scored triple victories in a day, ending the month with his total score standing at 31, making him Britain's top-scoring ace. By this time he had told his commanding officer that he had to have a rest and that he was taking unnecessary risks because of his nerves. On 3 October, he was sent on leave, en route to a posting at the Home Establishment in England. A French semi-official report of Ball's successes was issued the same day; it was picked up and repeated in the British aviation journal Flight nine days later.

=== Home front ===
Ball had been awarded the Distinguished Service Order (DSO) and bar simultaneously on 26 September 1916. The first award was "for conspicuous gallantry and skill" when he took on two enemy formations. The bar was also "for conspicuous skill and gallantry" when he attacked four enemy aircraft in formation and then, on another occasion, 12 enemy machines. He was awarded the Russian Order of St. George the same month. Now that Ball had been posted back to England, he was lionised as a national hero with a reputation as a fearless pilot and expert marksman. A crowd of journalists awaited him on his family's doorstep. In an interview, he mentioned being downed six times in combat. On 18 November, he was invested with his Military Cross and both DSOs by King George V at Buckingham Palace. A second bar to the DSO, for taking on three enemy aircraft and shooting one down, followed on 25 November, making him the first three-time recipient of the award. Ball was promoted to the substantive rank of lieutenant on 8 December 1916.

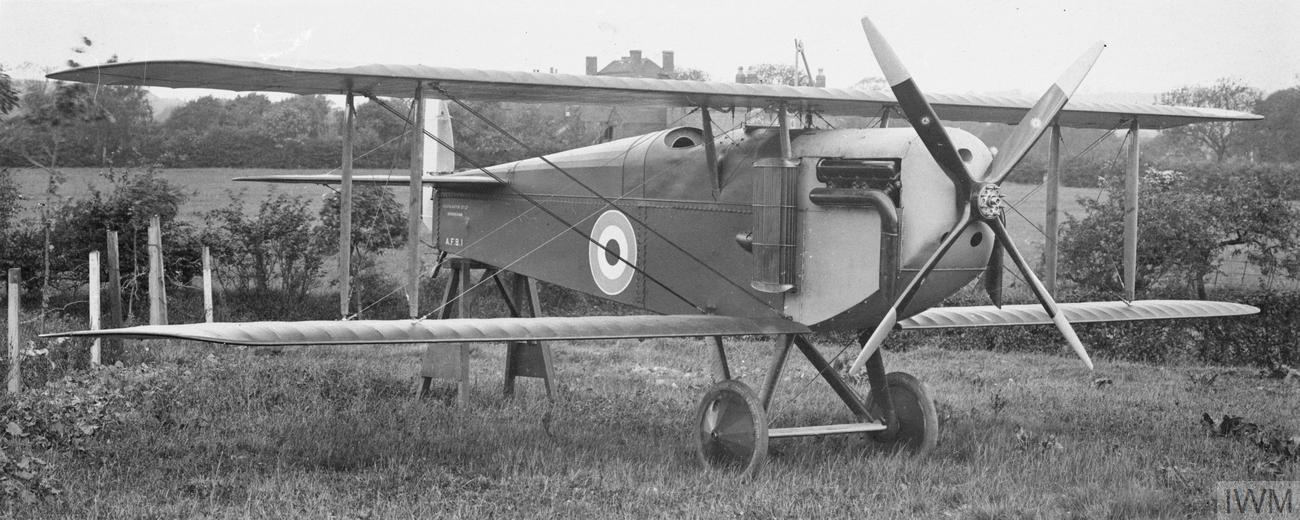
Austin-Ball A.F.B.1 outside Longbridge Works, 1917

Instead of returning to combat after his leave, Ball was posted to instructional duties with No. 34 (Reserve) Squadron RFC, based at Orford Ness, Suffolk. About this time he was debriefed by flying instructor Philip Gribble, who was charged with discovering the tactics of ace fighter pilots; Gribble decided Ball operated on "paramount courage and a bit of luck". Ball asked Gribble to let him try a Bristol Scout, which he landed badly, seriously damaging the undercarriage; Ball asked for another machine to try again, with the same result, after which he consoled himself by eating "seven pounds of chocolate". It was while serving on the home front that he was able to lobby for the building and testing of the Austin-Ball A.F.B.1 fighter. He hoped to be able to take an example of the type to France with him, but the prototype was not completed until after his death in action. In November he was invited to test fly the prototype of the new Royal Aircraft Factory S.E.5 single-seat scout, apparently the first service pilot to do so. He was unimpressed, finding the heavier, more stable fighter less responsive to the controls than the Nieuports he was used to. His negative assessment of other aspects of the S.E.'s performance, on the other hand, contrasted markedly with the reactions of fellow pilots who tested the prototype about this time. Ball was to maintain his opinion of the S.E. as a "dud", at least until he had scored several victories on the type after his return to France.

On 19 February 1917, in a tribute from his native city, Ball became an Honorary Freeman of Nottingham. Around this time he met James McCudden, also on leave, who later reported his impressions in most favourable terms. In London, Ball also encountered Canadian pilot Billy Bishop, who had not as yet seen combat. He immediately liked Bishop, and may have helped the latter secure a posting to No. 60 Squadron. On 25 March, while off-duty, Ball met 18-year-old Flora Young. He invited her to fly with him, and she accepted, wearing a leather flying coat that they had borrowed. On 5 April, they became engaged; she wore his silver identification wrist bracelet in lieu of an engagement ring.

=== Second fighter posting ===
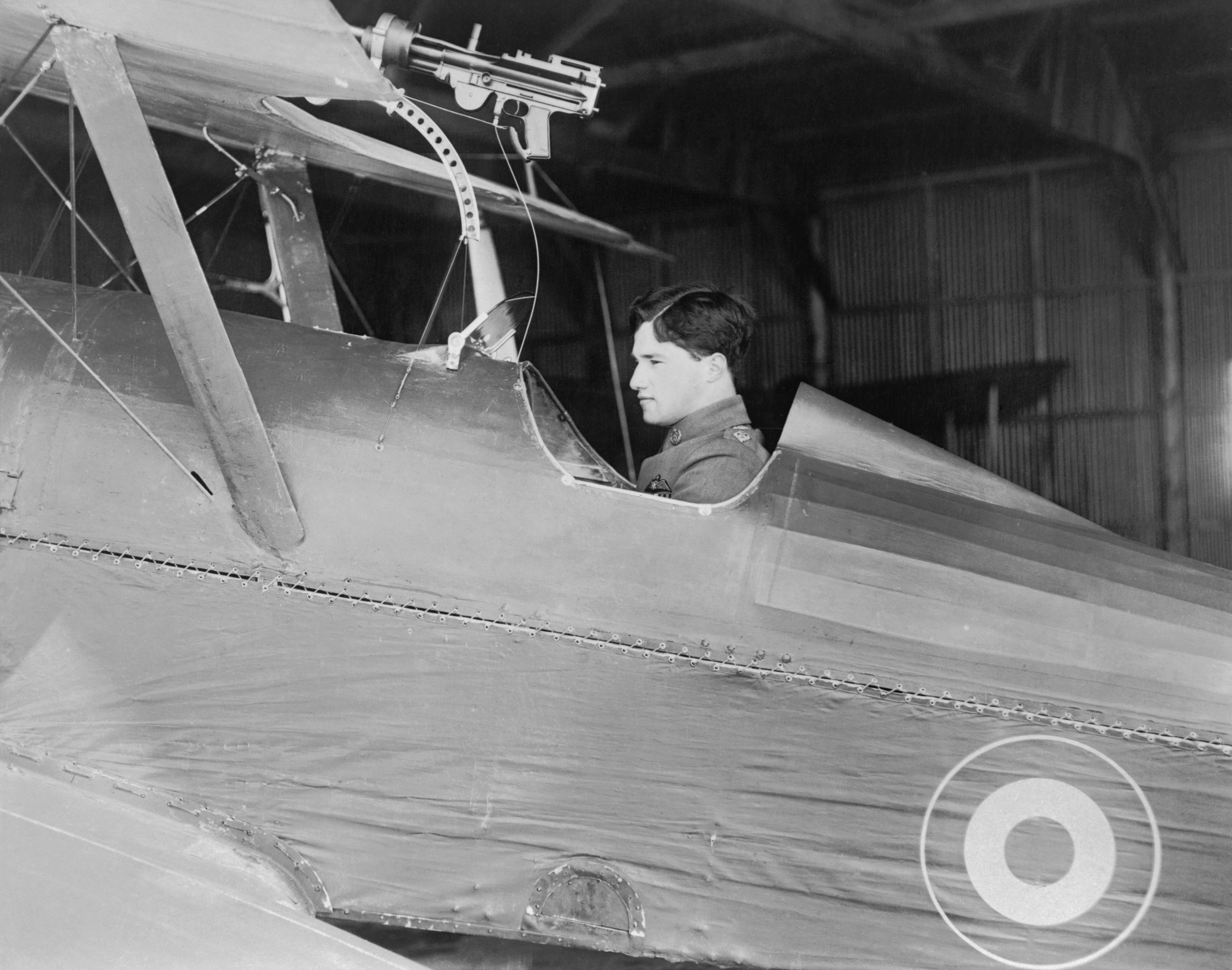
Ball in the cockpit of his S.E.5, April 1917

Inaction chafed Ball, and he began agitating for a return to combat duty. He finally managed to obtain a posting as a flight commander with No. 56 Squadron RFC, considered to be as close to an elite unit as any established by the RFC. Ball was still first among Britain's aces, and some documents hint that his attachment to No. 56 Squadron was planned to be temporary. According to one account he had been slated to serve with the unit for only a month to mentor novice pilots.

The latest type from the Royal Aircraft Factory, the S.E.5, had been selected to equip the new squadron. This choice was viewed with some trepidation by the RFC high command, and Ball himself was personally far from happy with the S.E.5. After some intense lobbying he was allowed to retain his Nieuport 17 no. B1522 when the unit went to France; the Nieuport was for his solo missions, and he would fly an S.E.5 on patrols with the rest of the squadron. This arrangement had the personal approval of General Hugh Trenchard, who went on to become the first Chief of the Air Staff of the Royal Air Force. No. 56 Squadron moved to the Western Front on 7 April 1917. On arrival Ball wrote to his parents, "Cheero, am just about to start the great game again".

S.E.5 no. A4850, fresh from its packing crate, was extensively modified for Ball: in particular he had the synchronised Vickers machine gun removed, to be replaced with a second Lewis gun fitted to fire downwards through the floor of the cockpit. He also had a slightly larger fuel tank installed. On 9 April, A4850 was refitted, and the downward-firing Lewis gun removed and replaced by the normal Vickers gun mounting. In a letter to Flora Young on 18 April, Ball mentioned getting his own hut on the flight line, and installing the members of his flight nearby.

On 23 April 1917, Ball was under strict orders to stay over British lines, but still engaged the Germans five times in his Nieuport. In his first combat that day, using his preferred belly shot, he sent an Albatros into a spin, following it down and continuing to fire at it until it struck the ground. It was No. 56 Squadron's first victory. Regaining an altitude of 5,000 feet (1,500 m), he tried to dive underneath an Albatros two-seater and pop up under its belly as usual, but he overshot, and the German rear gunner put a burst of 15 bullets through the Nieuport's wings and spars. Ball coaxed the Nieuport home for repairs, returning to battle in an S.E.5. In his third combat of the day, he fired five rounds before his machine gun jammed. After landing to clear the gun, he took off once more, surprising five Albatros fighters and sending one down in flames. His fifth battle, shortly thereafter, appeared inconclusive, as the enemy plane managed to land safely. However, its observer had been mortally wounded.

Three days later, on 26 April, Ball scored another double victory, flying S.E.5 no. A4850, and one more on 28 April. This last day's fighting left the S.E.5 so battered by enemy action that it was dismantled and sent away for repair. The following month, despite continual problems with jamming guns in the S.E.5s, Ball shot down seven Albatroses in five days, including two reconnaissance models on 1 May, a reconnaissance plane and an Albatros D.III fighter on 2 May; a D.III on 4 May, and two D.IIIs the next day, 5 May. The second of these victims nearly rammed Ball as they shot it out in a head-on firing pass. As they sped past one another, Ball was left temporarily blinded by oil spraying from the holed oil tank of his craft. Clearing the oil from his eyes, he flew his S.E.5 home with zero oil pressure in an engine on the brink of seizure. He was so overwrought that it was some time after landing before he could finish thanking God, then dictating his combat report.

While squadron armourers and mechanics repaired the faulty machine-gun synchroniser on his most recent S.E.5 mount, A8898, Ball had been sporadically flying the Nieuport again, and was successful with it on 6 May, destroying one more Albatros D.III in an evening flight to raise his tally to 44. He had continued to undertake his habitual lone patrols, but had of late been fortunate to survive. The heavier battle damage that Ball's aircraft were now suffering bore witness to the improved team tactics being developed by his German opponents. Some time on 6 May, Ball had visited his friend Billy Bishop at the latter's aerodrome. He proposed that the pair attack the Red Baron's squadron at its airfield at dawn, catching the German pilots off guard. Bishop agreed to take part in the daring scheme at the end of the month, after he returned from his forthcoming leave. That night, in his last letter to his father, Ball wrote "I do get tired of always living to kill, and am really beginning to feel like a murderer. Shall be so pleased when I have finished".

=== Final flight and aftermath ===
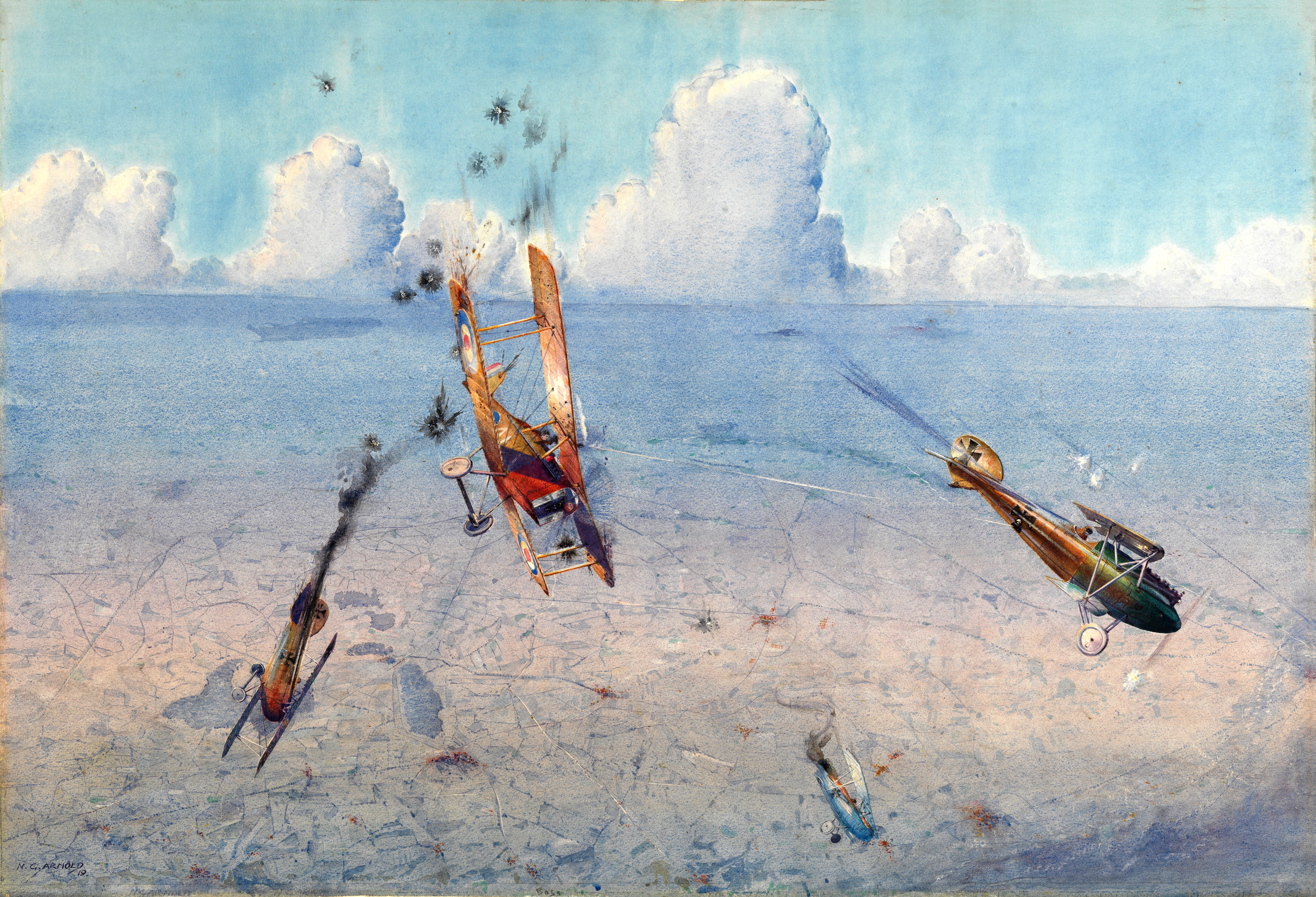
The Last Fight of Captain Ball, VC, DSO and 2 Bars, MC, 7 May 1917 by Norman Arnold, 1919

On the evening of 7 May 1917, near Douai, 11 British aircraft from No. 56 Squadron led by Ball in an S.E.5 encountered German fighters from Jasta 11. A running dogfight in deteriorating visibility resulted, and the aircraft became scattered. Cecil Arthur Lewis, a participant in this fight, described it in his memoir Sagittarius Rising. Ball was last seen by fellow pilots pursuing the red Albatros D.III of the Red Baron's younger brother, Lothar von Richthofen, who eventually landed near Annœullin with a punctured fuel tank. Cyril Crowe observed Ball flying into a dark thundercloud. A German pilot officer on the ground, Lieutenant Hailer, then saw Ball's plane falling upside-down from the bottom of the cloud, at an altitude of 200 feet (61 m), with a dead prop.

Brothers Franz and Carl Hailer and the other two men in their party were from a German reconnaissance unit, Flieger-Abteilung A292. Franz Hailer noted, "It was leaving a cloud of black smoke ... caused by oil leaking into the cylinders." The engine had to be inverted for this to happen. The Hispano engine was known to flood its inlet manifold with fuel when upside down and then stop running. Franz Hailer and his three companions hurried to the crash site. Ball was already dead when they arrived. The four German airmen agreed that the crashed craft had suffered no battle damage. No bullet wounds were found on Ball's body, even though Hailer went through Ball's clothing to find identification. Hailer also took Ball to a field hospital. A German doctor subsequently described a broken back and a crushed chest, along with fractured limbs, as the cause of death.

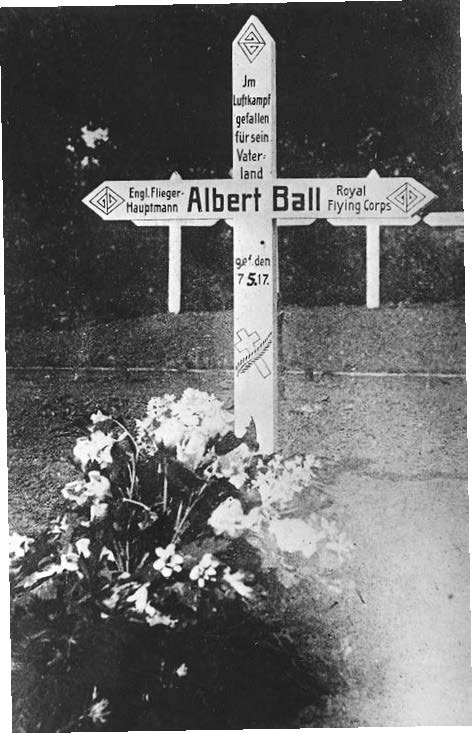
The original German marker erected at Ball's grave in Annoeullin

The Germans credited Richthofen with shooting down Ball, but there is some doubt as to what happened, especially as Richthofen's claim was for a Sopwith Triplane, not an S.E.5, which is a biplane. Given the amount of propaganda the German High Command generated touting the younger Richthofen, a high-level decision may have been taken to attribute Ball's death to him. It is probable that Ball was not shot down at all, but had become disorientated and lost control during his final combat, the victim of a form of temporary vertigo that has claimed other pilots. Ball's squadron harboured hopes that he was a prisoner of war, and the British government officially listed him as "missing" on 18 May. There was much speculation in the press; in France, the Havas news agency reported: "Albert Ball, the star of aviators ... has been missing since the 7th May. Is he a prisoner or has he been killed? If he is dead, he died fighting for his forty-fifth victory." It was only at the end of the month that the Germans dropped messages behind Allied lines announcing that Ball was dead, and had been buried in Annoeullin with full military honours two days after he crashed. Over the grave of the man they dubbed "the English Richthofen", the Germans erected a cross bearing the inscription Im Luftkampf gefallen für sein Vaterland Engl. Flieger-Hauptmann Albert Ball, Royal Flying Corps ("Fallen in air combat for his fatherland English pilot Captain Albert Ball").

Ball's death was reported worldwide in the press. He was lauded as the "wonder boy of the Flying Corps" in Britain's Weekly Dispatch, the "Ace of English Aces" in Portugal, the "héroe aviador" in South America, and the "super-airman" in France. On 7 June 1917, the London Gazette announced that he had received the Croix de Chevalier, Legion d'Honneur from the French government. The following day, he was awarded the Victoria Cross for his "most conspicuous and consistent bravery" in action from 25 April to 6 May 1917. On 10 June 1917, a memorial service was held for Ball in the centre of Nottingham at St Mary's Church, with large crowds paying tribute as the procession of mourners passed by. Among those attending were Ball's father Albert, Sr. and brother Cyril, now also a pilot in the RFC; his mother Harriett, overwhelmed with grief, was not present. Ball was posthumously promoted to captain on 15 June. His Victoria Cross was presented to his parents by King George V on 22 July 1917. The following year he was awarded a special medal by the Aero Club of America.

=== Posthumous tributes ===
Posthumous portrait of Ball by Edward Newling, 1919

In 1918, Walter A. Briscoe and H. Russell Stannard released a seminal biography, Captain Ball VC, reprinting many of Ball's letters and prefaced with encomiums by Prime Minister David Lloyd George, Field Marshal Sir Douglas Haig, and Major General Sir Hugh Trenchard. Lloyd George wrote that "What he says in one of his letters, 'I hate this game, but it is the only thing one must do just now', represents, I believe, the conviction of those vast armies who, realising what is at stake, have risked all and endured all that liberty may be saved". Haig spoke of Ball's "unrivalled courage" and his "example and incentive to those who have taken up his work". In Trenchard's opinion, Ball had "a wonderfully well-balanced brain, and his loss to the Flying Corps was the greatest loss it could sustain at that time".

In the book proper, Briscoe and Stannard quote Ball's most notable opponent, Manfred von Richthofen. The Red Baron, who believed in his younger brother's victory award, considered Ball "by far the best English flying man". Elsewhere in the book, an unidentified Royal Flying Corps pilot who flew with Ball in his last engagement was quoted as saying, "I see they have given him the V.C. Of course he won it a dozen times over—the whole squadron knows that." The authors themselves described the story of Ball's life as that of "a young knight of gentle manner who learnt to fly and to kill at a time when all the world was killing ... saddened by the great tragedy that had come into the world and made him a terrible instrument of Death".

Linda Raine Robertson, in The Dream of Civilised Warfare, noted that Briscoe and Stannard emphasised "the portrait of a boy of energy, pluck, and humility, a loner who placed his skill in the service of his nation, fought—indeed, invited—a personal war, and paid the ultimate sacrifice as a result", and that they "struggle to paste the mask of cheerful boyishness over the signs of the toll taken on him by the stress of air combat and the loss of friends".

Alan Clark, in Aces High: The War in the Air Over the Western Front, found Ball the "perfect public schoolboy" with "the enthusiasms and all the eager intelligence of that breed" and that these characteristics, coupled with a lack of worldly maturity, were "the ingredients of a perfect killer, where a smooth transition can be made between the motives that drive a boy to 'play hard' at school and then to 'fight hard' against the King's enemies". Biographer Chaz Bowyer considered that "to label Albert Ball a 'killer' would be to do him a grave injustice", as his "sensitive nature suffered in immediate retrospect whenever he succeeded in combat".

== Post-war legacy ==
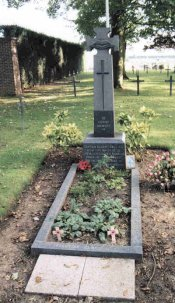
Grave of Albert Ball

After the war the British discovered Ball's grave, which had been behind enemy lines, in the Annoeullin Cemetery. In December 1918, personnel of No. 207 Squadron RAF erected a new cross in place of the one left by the Germans. The Imperial War Graves Commission (now Commonwealth War Graves Commission) were working at the time to consolidate the British war graves into fewer cemeteries; 23 British bodies in graves in the location where Ball was buried were moved to the Cabaret Rouge British Cemetery, but at his father's request Ball's grave was allowed to remain. Albert Sr. paid for a private memorial to be erected over Ball's grave, No. 643, in what later became the Annoeullin Communal Cemetery and German Extension. Ball's is the only British grave from the First World War in this extension, the rest being German. Ball's father also bought the French field where his son had died and erected a memorial stone on the crash site.

Memorials to Ball in his native Nottingham include a monument and statue in the grounds of Nottingham Castle. The monument, which was commissioned by the city council and funded by public subscription, consists of a bronze group on a carved pedestal of Portland stone and granite. The bronze group, by the sculptor Henry Poole, shows a life-size figure of Ball with an allegorical female figure at his shoulder. The monument was unveiled on 8 September 1921 by Air Marshal Trenchard, with military honours including a flypast by a squadron of RAF aircraft. In 1929 the bronze model for Ball's statue was presented by his father to the National Portrait Gallery in London, where it is on display. In further remembrance of his son, Albert Ball, Sr. commissioned the building of the Albert Ball Memorial Homes in Lenton to house the families of local servicemen killed in action. The Lenton War Memorial, located in front of the homes, includes Ball's name and was also paid for by the Ball family. The homes were Grade-II listed for historic preservation in 1995.

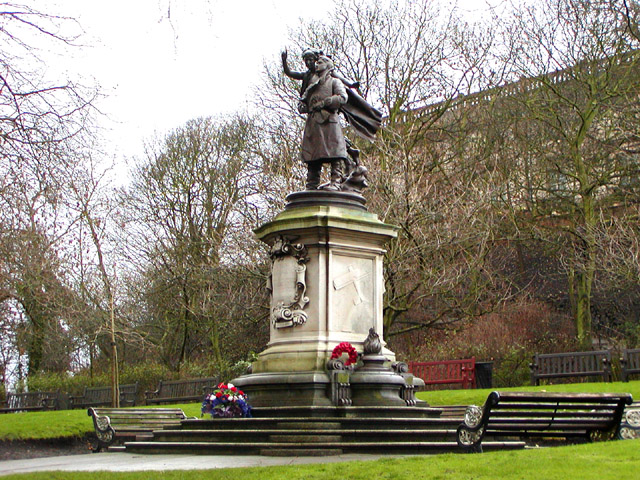
Statue of Captain Albert Ball in the grounds of Nottingham Castle

A memorial to Ball, along with his parents, and a sister who died in infancy, appears on the exterior wall of the southwest corner of Holy Trinity Church in Lenton. Another memorial tablet is present inside the same church, mounted on the north wall and bearing the RFC and RAF motto Per Ardua ad Astra, along with decorations of medals and royal arms. In 1967, the Albert Ball VC Scholarships were instituted at his alma mater, Trent College. A propeller from one of Ball's aircraft and the original cross from his grave in France are displayed at the college's library and chapel, respectively. One of the houses at Nottingham High's Junior School is also named after Ball.

In 2006, Ball was one of six recipients of the Victoria Cross to be featured on a special commemorative edition of Royal Mail stamps marking the 150th anniversary of the award. In 2015, Ball was featured on a £5 coin (issued in silver and gold) in a six-coin set commemorating the Centenary of the First World War by the Royal Mint. His Victoria Cross is displayed at the Nottingham Castle Museum along with his other medals and memorabilia, including a bullet-holed Avro windshield, a section of engine piping from one of his damaged Nieuports, his Freedom of Nottingham Scroll and Casket, and various letters and other papers. A portrait study by Noel Denholm Davis is in the collection of Nottingham City Museums and Galleries.

== Award citations ==
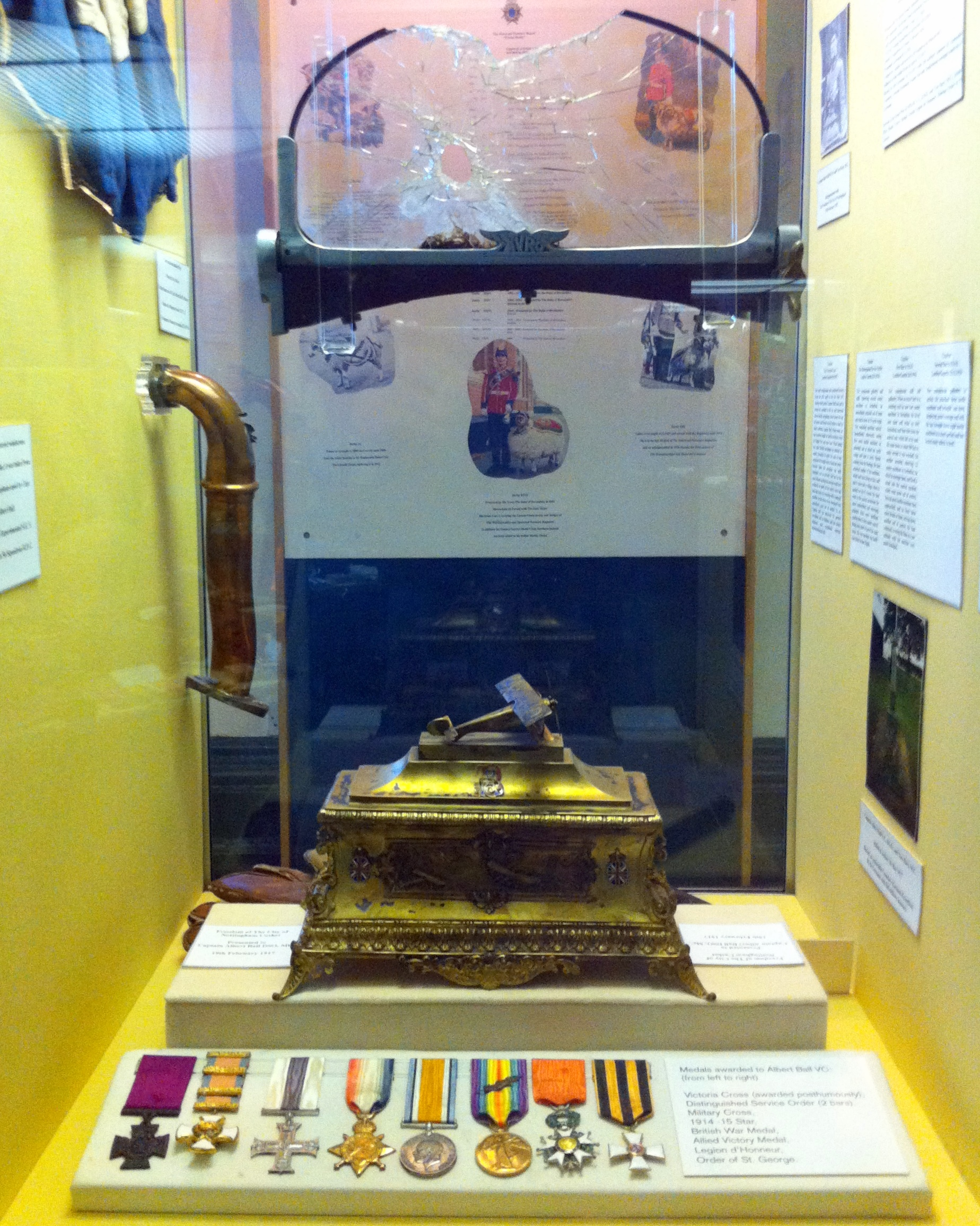
Ball's medals and other memorabilia in Nottingham Castle Museum. From left to right, the medals are: Victoria Cross, Distinguished Service Order with two bars, Military Cross, 1914–15 Star, British War Medal, Allied Victory Medal, Legion of Honour (Knight's Cross), Order of St George.

- Victoria Cross

Lt. (temp. Capt.) Albert Ball, D.S.O., M.C., late Notts. and Derby. R., and R.F.C.

For most conspicuous and consistent bravery from the 25th of April to the 6th of May, 1917, during which period Capt. Ball took part in twenty-six combats in the air and destroyed eleven hostile aeroplanes, drove down two out of control, and forced several others to land.

In these combats Capt. Ball, flying alone, on one occasion fought six hostile machines, twice he fought five and once four. When leading two other British aeroplanes he attacked an enemy formation of eight. On each of these occasions he brought down at least one enemy.

Several times his aeroplane was badly damaged, once so seriously that but for the most delicate handling his machine would have collapsed, as nearly all the control wires had been shot away. On returning with a damaged machine he had always to be restrained from immediately going out on another.

In all, Capt. Ball has destroyed forty-three German aeroplanes and one balloon, and has always displayed most exceptional courage, determination and skill.

- Distinguished Service Order (DSO)

For conspicuous gallantry and skill. Observing seven enemy machines in formation, he immediately attacked one of them and shot it down at 15 yards range. The remaining machines retired. Immediately afterwards, seeing five more hostile machines, he attacked one at about 10 yards range and shot it down, flames coming out of the fuselage. He then attacked another of the machines, which had been firing at him, and shot it down into a village, when it landed on the top of a house. He then went to the nearest aerodrome for more ammunition, and, returning, attacked three more machines, causing them to dive under control. Being then short of petrol he came home. His own machine was badly shot about in these fights.

- Distinguished Service Order (DSO) Bar

For conspicuous skill and gallantry. When on escort duty to a bombing raid he saw four enemy machines in formation. He dived on to them and broke up their formation, and then shot down the nearest one, which fell on its nose. He came down to about 500 feet to make certain it was wrecked. On another occasion, observing 12 enemy machines in formation, he dived in among them, and fired a drum into the nearest machine, which went down out of control. Several more hostile machines then approached, and he fired three more drums at them, driving down another out of control. He then returned, crossing the lines at a low altitude, with his machine very much damaged.

- Distinguished Service Order (DSO) Bar

For conspicuous gallantry in action. He attacked three hostile machines and brought one down, displaying great courage and skill. He has brought down eight hostile machines in a short period, and has forced many others to land.

- Military Cross (MC)

For conspicuous skill and gallantry on many occasions, notably when, after failing to destroy an enemy kite balloon with bombs, he returned for a fresh supply, went back and brought it down in flames. He has done great execution among enemy aeroplanes. On one occasion he attacked six in one flight, forced down two and drove the others off. This occurred several miles over the enemy's lines.

== List of victories ==
Confirmed victories numbered; unconfirmed victories marked "u/c". Except where noted, data from Shores et al.

No.	Date/time	Aircraft	Foe	Result	Location	Notes
u/c	29 March 1916	Royal Aircraft Factory B.E.2c	German reconnaissance plane	Inconclusive		Ball's observer/gunner was S. A. Villiers
1	16 May 1916 @ 0845 hours	Bristol Scout serial number 5312	Albatros reconnaissance plane	Driven down out of control	Givenchy-Beaumont	German observer wounded in action
2	29 May 1916 @ 0800 hours	Nieuport s/n 5173	LVG reconnaissance plane	Driven down out of control	Beaumont	Last seen in a vertical dive
3	29 May 1916 @ 0830 hours	Nieuport s/n 5173	LVG reconnaissance plane	Forced to land	Oppy	
4	1 June 1916 @ 1010 hours	Nieuport s/n 5173	Fokker Eindecker	Forced to land	A mile west of Douai Aerodrome	
5	25 June 1916 @ 1600 hours	Nieuport s/n 5173	Observation balloon	Destroyed	Unknown	
6	2 July 1916 @ 1730 hours	Nieuport s/n A134	Roland C.II	Destroyed	Along the Mercatel-Arras road	
7	2 July 1916 @ 1800 hours	Nieuport s/n A134	Aviatik reconnaissance plane	Destroyed	Vicinity of Lens	
8	16 August 1916 @ 0910 hours	Nieuport A201	Roland C.II	Forced to land	Southeast of Saint-Léger	
9	22 August 1916 c. 1900 hours	Nieuport A201	Roland C.II	Destroyed	West of Bapaume	
10	22 August 1916 c. 1930 hours	Nieuport A201	Roland C.II	Set afire in midair; destroyed	Vaux	
11	22 August 1916 @ c. 1945 hours	Nieuport s/n A201	Roland C.II	Destroyed	Vaux-Maurepas	Wilhelm Cymera WIA and his observer died of wounds
12	25 August 1916 @ 1100 hours	Nieuport s/n A201	Roland C.II	Driven down out of control	South of Arras	
13	28 August 1916 @ 0700 hours	Nieuport s/n A201	Roland C.II	Forced to land	Southeast of Bapaume	
14	28 August 1916 c. 1900 hours	Nieuport s/n A201	Roland C.II	Destroyed	East of Ayette	
15	28 August 1916 @ 1900 hours	Nieuport s/n A201	German reconnaissance plane	Forced to land	North of Grévillers	
16	31 August 1916 @ 1830 hours	Nieuport s/n A201	Roland C.II	Destroyed	Southeast of Bapaume	
17	31 August 1916 @ 1830 hours	Nieuport s/n A201	Roland C.II	Forced to land	Southeast of Bapaume	
18	15 September 1916 @ 0955 hours	Nieuport s/n A200	Fokker D.II	Destroyed	East of Beugny	
19	15 September 1916 @ 1900 hours	Nieuport s/n A212	Roland C.II	Destroyed	Northeast of Bertincourt	
20	21 September 1916 c. 1600 hours	Nieuport s/n A213	Roland fighter	Forced to land	North of Bapaume	
21	21 September 1916 c. 1605 hours	Nieuport s/n A213	Roland fighter	Destroyed	Saint-Léger	
22	21 September 1916 c. 1800 hours	Nieuport s/n A213	Roland C.II	Destroyed	Bucquoy	
23	22 September 1916 c. 1700 hours	Nieuport s/n A213	Fokker fighter	Destroyed	East of Bapaume	Winard Grafe of Jasta 2 KIA
24	23 September 1916 @ 1800 hours	Nieuport s/n A213	Roland C.II	Set afire in midair; destroyed	Mory	
25	25 September 1916 @ 1830 hours	Nieuport s/n A213	Albatros reconnaissance plane	Set afire in midair; destroyed	Bapaume-Cambrai	Pilot WIA, observer KIA
26	28 September 1916 @ 1745 hours	Nieuport s/n A213	Albatros reconnaissance plane	Destroyed	Southeast of Saint-Léger	
27	28 September 1916 c. 1915 hours	Nieuport s/n A213	Albatros reconnaissance plane	Forced to land	Bapaume	
28	28 September 1916 c. 1930 hours	Nieuport s/n A213	Albatros reconnaissance plane	Forced to land	Northeast of Bapaume	
29	30 September 1916 @ 1055 hours	Nieuport s/n A201	Albatros reconnaissance plane	Set afire in midair; destroyed	Vélu	Shared victory
30	30 September 1916 @ 1830 hours	Nieuport s/n A213	Roland reconnaissance plane	Driven down out of control	Graincourt-lès-Havrincourt	
31	30 September 1916 @ 1845 hours	Nieuport s/n A213	Roland reconnaissance plane	Driven down out of control	Cambrai	
u/c	1 October 1916			Forced to land		
u/c	1 October 1916			Forced to land		
u/c	1 October 1916			Forced to land		
33	23 April 1917 @ 1145 hours	Royal Aircraft Factory S.E.5 s/n A4850	Albatros D.III	Set afire in midair; destroyed	Cambrai-Selvigny	
34	26 April 1917 between 1920 and 2000 hours	Royal Aircraft Factory S.E.5 s/n A4850	Albatros D.III	Destroyed	Northeast of Cambrai	
35	26 April 1917 between 1920 and 2000 hours	Royal Aircraft Factory S.E.5 s/n A4850	Siemens-Schuckert D.I	Destroyed	East of Cambrai	
36	28 April 1917 between 1650 and 1745 hours	Royal Aircraft Factory S.E.5 s/n A4850	Albatros reconnaissance plane	Destroyed	Fontaine	
37	1 May 1917 @ 1700 hours	Royal Aircraft Factory S.E.5 s/n A8898	Albatros reconnaissance plane	Destroyed	Marquoin	
38	1 May 1917 @ 1950 hours	Royal Aircraft Factory S.E.5 s/n A8898	Albatros reconnaissance plane	Driven down out of control	Southwest of Cambrai	
39	2 May 1917 @ 0740 hours	Royal Aircraft Factory S.E.5 s/n A4855	Albatros D.III	Destroyed	Halte-Vitry	
40	2 May 1917 @ 0810 hours	Royal Aircraft Factory S.E.5 s/n A4855	Albatros reconnaissance plane	Destroyed	Sailly	
41	4 May 1917 between 1850 and 2000 hours	Royal Aircraft Factory S.E.5 s/n A8898	Albatros D.III	Destroyed	Graincourt	
42	5 May 1917 between 1830 and 1900 hours	Royal Aircraft Factory S.E.5 s/n A8898	Albatros D.III	Destroyed	Lens-Carvin	
43	5 May 1917 between 1830 and 1900 hours	Royal Aircraft Factory S.E.5 s/n A8898	Albatros D.III	Destroyed	Lens-Carvin	
44	6 May 1917 @ 1930 hours	Nieuport s/n B1522	Albatros D.III	Destroyed	Sancourt	
u/c	7 May 1917	Royal Aircraft Factory S.E.5	Albatros D.III	Forced to land	Vicinity of Annoeullin	Lothar von Richthofen shot down but unwounded
