= Barbeque 67 =

Music festival

- Genre: Rock, including rhythm and blues, blues rock, psychedelic rock and soul styles.
- Dates: 29 May 1967
- Locations: Spalding, Lincolnshire, England
- Years active: 1967
- Founders: Brian Thompson

Barbeque 67 was a music event held in the market town of Spalding, Lincolnshire, in the East Midlands of England. Despite the presence of many well-known artists among its lineup, the event remains largely unknown. It is considered by some to have been the first rock festival.

== Inception ==
Towards the end of 1966, Grantham promoter, former footballer Brian Thompson, set about booking Geno Washington and the Ram Jam Band and the Move for a Bank Holiday concert in Spalding. Their management persuaded Thompson to also book three relatively unknown acts at that time: Pink Floyd, the Jimi Hendrix Experience and Cream.

The event was held in Spalding at the Tulip Bulb Auction Hall, most likely the largest building in the town that could hold a large crowd. In addition, Zoot Money's Big Roll Band were booked, along with a local covers outfit, Sounds Force 5, who were expected to ensure a decent turnout and were to perform in all changeovers between each band at the side of the stage.

Advertising was national and massively underestimated, with thousands making their way to the market town, causing national radio to warn travellers to turn back. Attendance numbers have been estimated with a venue capacity of 6,000 and twice as many unable to gain entry. Tickets cost just £1 and covered accommodation came in the form of the Spalding Town F.C. stand next door.

== Lineup ==
- Geno Washington and the Ram Jam Band
- Zoot Money and his Big Roll Band
- Cream (Note: The setlist for Cream was "N.S.U.", "Sunshine of Your Love", "We're Going Wrong", "Stepping Out", "Rollin' and Tumblin'", "Toad" and "I'm So Glad")
- Jimi Hendrix Experience
- The Move
- Pink Floyd
- Sounds Force 5 (between each main performance)

== The show ==
The Spring Bank Holiday was sunny and hot, which would have been very uncomfortable in a large crowd inside the venue, which was essentially a metal shed. The event appeared to be unorganised and the sound terrible. For the opening act, Pink Floyd, the audience was small, but the hall quickly became overfull with fans being trapped underneath the stage. The two bands seen as "psychedelic, Pink Floyd and the Move, opened the show, followed by the two blues rock groups, Jimi Hendrix and Cream. Pink Floyd performed at the rear of the venue using a white bed sheet onto which moving images were projected.

Hendrix had many technical issues, including tuning problems, was late on stage, meaning only a half-hour set, and finished by throwing his guitar into his speaker stack, the same red Fender Stratocaster he would burn at the Monterey International Pop Festival the following month. It was widely agreed that Eric Clapton of Cream out-played Hendrix that day and that Geno Washington made a great show.

== Legacy ==
Whilst a groundbreaking event for its time in the Summer of Love, ahead of the famous Monterey Pop Festival and possibly the first rock music festival in the UK, the event remains largely unknown outside of its home.

The event became a one-off in Spalding due to opposition from local residents. Thompson, however, moved to a location in nearby Whittlesey, Cambridgeshire, for the 1968 event, the Barn Barbeque Concert and Dance, which included Donovan, Fairport Convention, Fleetwood Mac and the Move.

In 2009 the event was featured in the BBC TV programme Inside Out, and in 2015 a blue plaque commemorated the event, placed at the Red Lion Hotel where Jimi Hendrix stayed that night.

The event is the subject of a 2017 play, Barbecue '67 Revisited, by the Nottingham-based theatre group Excavate.

A radio play, Barbeque 67 – The Original Summer of Love, written by Andy Barrett, was broadcast on BBC Radio 4 on 29 May 2022 and included reminiscences from Geno Washington, Zoot Money and Nick Mason. A documentary followed from BBC Radio Lincolnshire in 2025 called Barbeque 67: Spalding's Groundbreaking Festival.

In 2026, the Spalding & District Civic Society reported that Past Present Possible CIC was collecting memories of the event as part of preparations for a week-long festival marking its 60th anniversary in May 2027.
