= Johnny Haddon Downes =

John Haddon Downes DFC (26 June 1920 – 28 December 2004) was an English Royal Air Force officer and television producer.

== Early life ==
He was the son of Mr Harold Downes (1864 - 8 September 1927) and Evelyn Eleanor Haddon (1889 - 2 October 1968). The Haddon family of Leicestershire, and Clipston, Northamptonshire were important in the late nineteenth century for printing presses. Walter Haddon had a type foundry in Market Harborough. His maternal grandmother, Eleanor Emma, died in Great Easton, aged 76, on 15 January 1933; his mother was unable to attend the funeral as she herself was too ill. His mother's brothers were Terence and Harold Haddon of Great Easton.

His maternal grandfather William Fox Haddon died on Wednesday 5 August 1942, aged 82; he had three sons and a daughter; one son Harwood (21 October 1886 - 26 September 1917, buried at Tyne Cot) was killed with the Sherwood Foresters in the First World War, and another son returned from the war, but died soon after from injuries.

Born in Great Easton, Leicestershire, Downes attended The King's School, Grantham. In 1935 he took part in the school operatic society, with Patience (opera), where he played the dairy maid Patience. The next year he was in The Gondoliers, playing a trumpeter. He lived at 38 Cambridge Street, then at 26 St Catherine's Road.

At age 18, he was known for impersonating film and stage stars.

== Career ==
He worked for the county council after school, at 'Beaconfield'.

=== Royal Air Force ===
After training as a surveyor, he joined the Royal Air Force Volunteer Reserve on the outbreak of the Second World War, in 1940, where he became a sergeant in March 1941, and became an officer later that year.

He was commissioned in October 1941. He started out in a Bristol Beaufighter X8226 in the Canadian 406 Sqn over the North Sea, destroying two Dornier Do 217 aircraft. Flying from RAF Predannack on 26 September 1942 at 2.15am, they intercepted a Do 217E, of 1./KG 2; it crashed into Chapel Road of St Just in Penwith, one of the crew parachuted, the others were killed.

He was in 604 Sqn from early 1943, on his second tour. 604 Sqn was the nightfighter squadron that the RAF trained its nightfighting squadron commanders with; it was where the legend of eating carrots, to help see enemy aircraft, had arisen. He became a flight lieutenant navigator in de Havilland Mosquito night fighters of No 604 Squadron, and was awarded the Distinguished Flying Cross in September 1944.

In early July 1944, flying from Maupertus-sur-Mer Airfield, he destroyed a Junkers Ju 88 over the mouth of the River Seine, with pilot Sqn Ldr Denis C Furse (21 June 1921 - 2002) of Manor Road North in Hinchley Wood, Surrey.

On Monday 1 January 1945, he shot down a Heinkel He 219 over the Ruhr.

=== Entertainment ===
Following the war, he took up a career in theatre as stage manager for Ivor Novello's King's Rhapsody, later working as a circus producer and ringmaster.

In 1953, Downes joined the BBC as floor manager, was promoted to producer, and developed the live children’s television show Crackerjack, which he produced and directed for 10 years. After the departure of Eamonn Andrews as Crackerjack presenter, Downes discovered Leslie Crowther and engaged him to take-over Andrews' role. He produced Crackerjack in Australia where it was shown on ABC, later returning to the BBC to produce the Basil Brush Show and Call My Bluff.

== Personal life ==
Downes married Barbara Whiting, singer and actress, in 1951. In the late 1970s he lived in Tandridge District.
