= Albert Ball (politician) =

British politician (1863–1946)

Sir Albert Ball JP (20 July 1863 – 27 March 1946) was Mayor of Nottingham and Lord Mayor of Nottingham, and the father of the famous Great War air ace Captain Albert Ball (1896–1917), a recipient of the Victoria Cross.

Ball started life as a plumber, and in 1896 was living at 301 Lenton Boulevard (now Castle Boulevard), Nottingham. By the end of the nineteenth century he had risen to become an estate agent, with an office in Nottingham and had moved to Sedgley House, 43 Lenton Avenue, The Park, Nottingham. He was a councillor for the Castle ward of the city and later appointed a justice of the peace.

In 1908, he purchased Bulwell Hall with 575 acres and mineral rights for £35,000 (equivalent to £4,615,839). In 1914, he retired as a director of the Austin Motor Company. In April 1919 he purchased Papplewick Hall for £136,410 (equivalent to £7,918,136 in 2023). In 1936 he also bought Upton Hall.

He was created a Knight Bachelor in 1924 and was Lord of the Manors of Bunny, Bradmore and Tollerton. In 1926, he built himself a new property, Stansted House, on Derby Road, Nottingham. He was Mayor of Nottingham in 1909, Alderman of Nottingham in 1929, and Lord Mayor of Nottingham in 1935.

His portrait, by Noel Denholm Davis, is in the collection of Nottingham City Museums and Galleries.

== Family ==
He was the son of George Ball and Lois Attenborough. He married firstly Harriett Mary Page (1864–1931) in 1886. The children from this marriage were:

- Hilda Ball (16 August 1887 – 27 August 1887)
- Lois Beatrice Ball (26 February 1892 – 7 March 1984) married in Nottingham on 2 March 1918 to Lieutenant G. Stafford Anderson
- Albert Ball VC, DSO**, MC (14 August 1896 – 7 May 1917)
- Arthur Cyril Ball (1897 – 2 July 1958)

In 1933, he married Estelle Dorothy Bella Dannah. He died aged 83 in Bournemouth.
