= Colin Pask =

English physicist and author (born 1943)

Colin Pask (born 1943) is a British mathematical physicist and science writer.

== Life ==
He was born in Great Gonerby, on the outskirts of Grantham in Lincolnshire, where his father was a dairy farmer. He was educated at King's School, Grantham from age 11, and went to Queen Mary College, London for a degree course in theoretical physics and mathematics. He graduated B.Sc. there in 1964.

== Career ==
Pask studied for a Ph.D. in nuclear physics under John M. Blatt at the University of New South Wales from 1964, graduating in 1967 with a dissertation entitled Studies in the Nuclear Three-Body Problem. He spent a period at Duke University, then returned to the University of New South Wales as lecturer in the Department of Applied Mathematics.

In 1971 Pask moved to the Australian National University, with an Australian Research Council fellowship to work in the Department of Applied Mathematics there. He was made a Fellow in 1973, and Senior Fellow in 1978. He moved in 1986 to become head of University College at UNSW Canberra at ADFA, retiring from that post after 12 years.

Pask is now Emeritus Professor of Mathematical Sciences and History at University of New South Wales.

== Research interests ==
As a post-doctoral researcher, Pask turned to optical physics and biological vision, among other topics. In 1973 he published with Allan Snyder an optical waveguide explanation of the Stiles–Crawford effect. Pask and McIntyre reviewed the theory and experimental results in the area, in a survey from 2013. Work of Pask and Kevin Barrell from 1980 contributed to the theory of the apposition eye.

During the 1970s, Pask also published on attenuation effects in optical fibres. He collaborated in this area with Adrian Ankiewicz.

== Works ==
Pask has written some works of popularisation:

- Math for the Frightened: Facing Scary Symbols and Everything Else That Freaks You Out About Mathematics (2011)
- Magnificent Principia: Exploring Isaac Newton's Masterpiece (2013)
- Great Calculations: A Surprising Look Behind 50 Scientific Inquiries (2015)
