= Noel Denholm Davis =

English portrait painter

Noel Denholm Davis (1876–1950) was a British artist, who worked chiefly as a portraitist.

He was born in Nottingham, England, in 1876 and studied at Nottingham School of Art, and then the Royal Academy Schools. He spent a decade working in London, before returning to live in Nottingham.

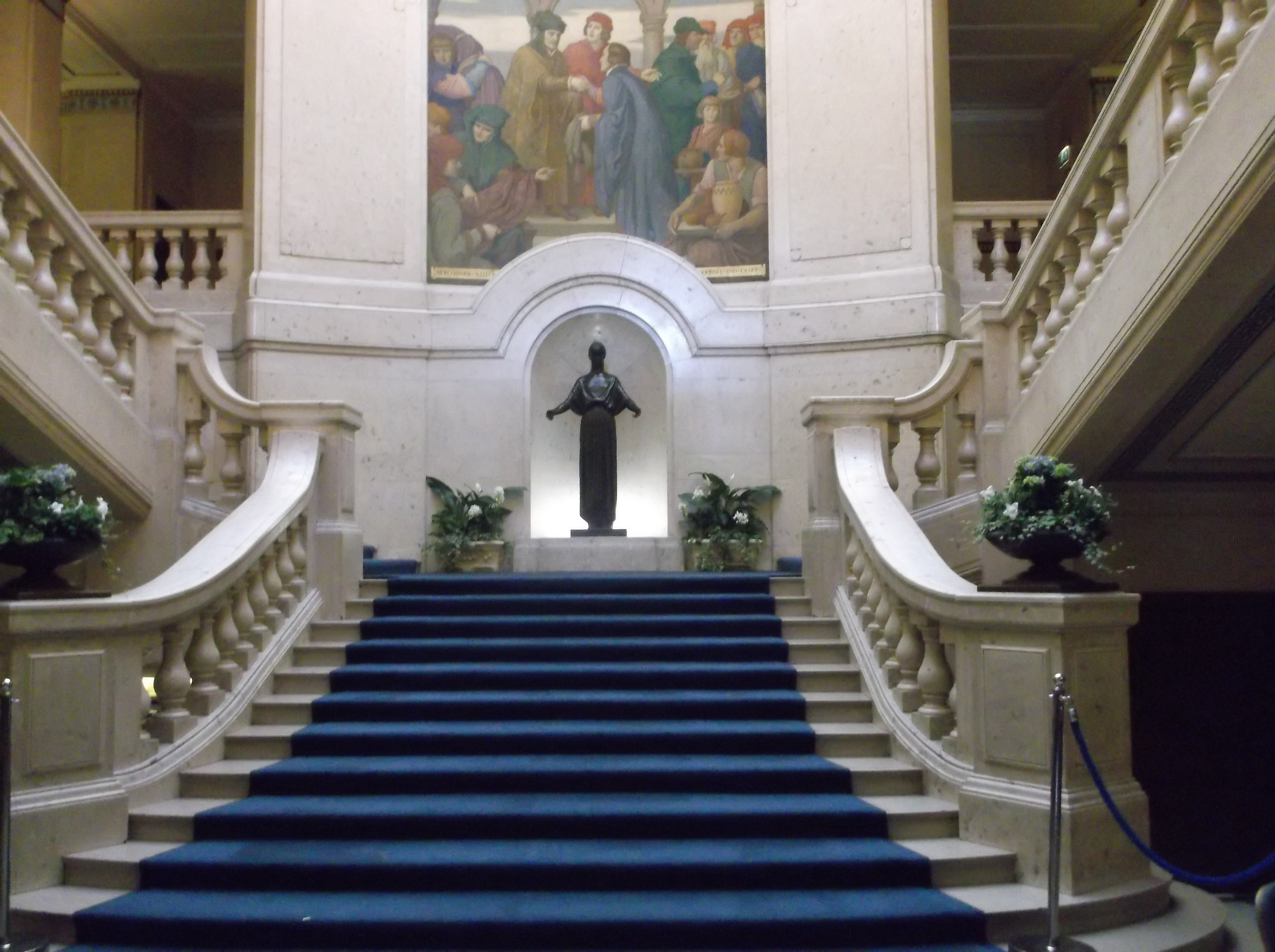
Staircase at Nottingham Council House, with one of Davis' frescoes, above

A number of his subjects have connections with Nottingham, including several owned by the University of Nottingham, Nottingham Castle Museum, and Nottingham City Museums and Galleries. One of his portraits of Jesse Boot, 1st Baron Trent is in the collection of the University of Nottingham, another of the same subject is on loan to the National Portrait Gallery. Among his other notable subjects were Albert Ball V.C. and William Booth, founder of the Salvation Army.

In 1929, Davis painted the frescoes, still extant, in the stairwell of Nottingham Council House.

He died at Goring-on-Thames, Oxfordshire, in 1950.
