= Foster mounting =

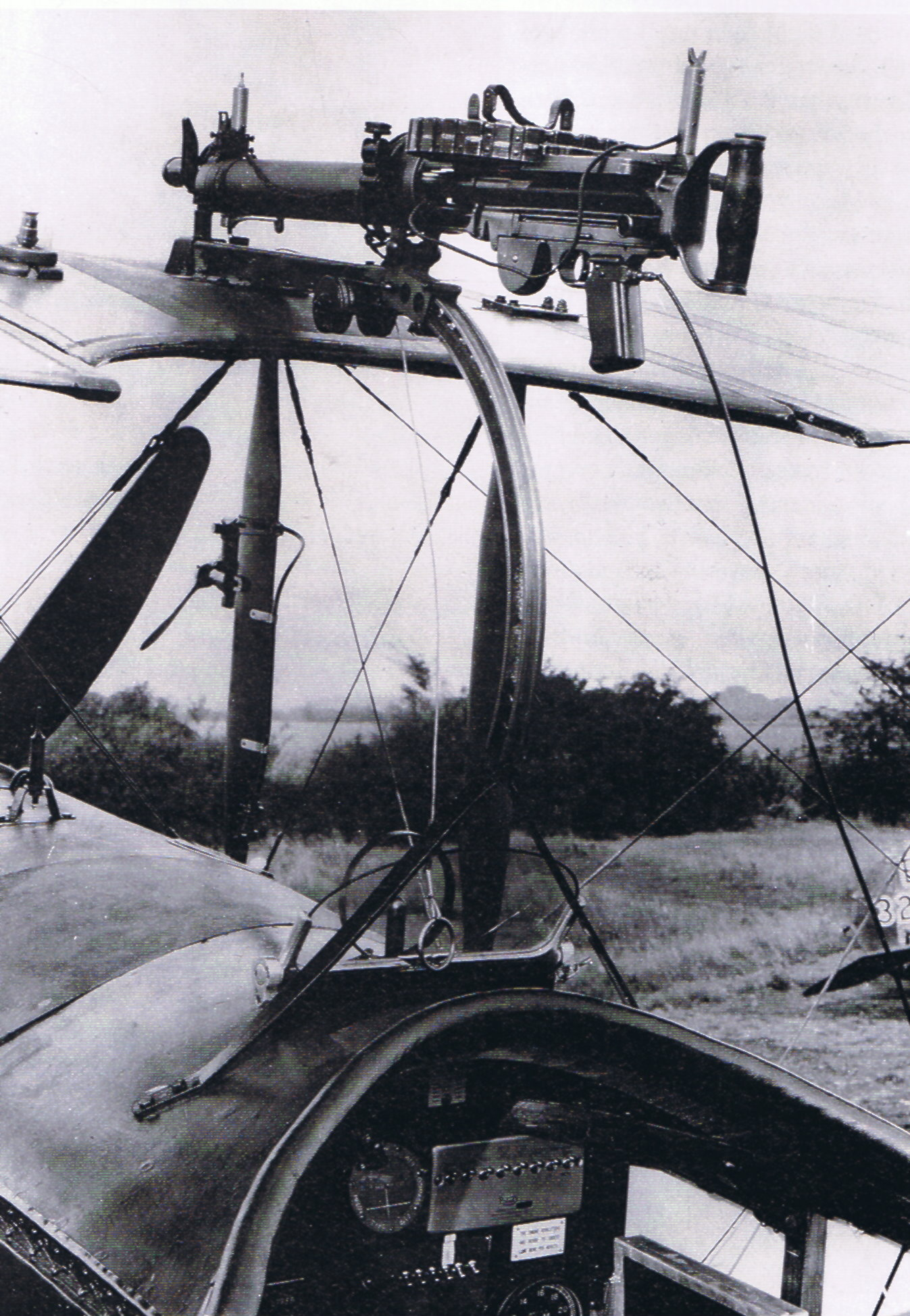
A Lewis gun on a Foster mounting (of the later, S.E.5 model) fitted to an Avro 504K Night Fighter

The Foster mounting was a device fitted to some fighter aircraft of the Royal Flying Corps during the First World War. It was designed to enable a machine gun (in practice, a Lewis Gun) to fire over, rather than through the arc of the spinning propeller. It took several forms when applied to different aircraft types, but all shared the feature of a quadrant-shaped I-beam rail on which the gun could slide back and down in one movement. The primary purpose was to facilitate the changing of spent ammunition drums, but some pilots also found that the mounting permitted the gun to be fired directly upward or at an angle, permitting a fighter aircraft to attack an opponent from beneath.

== Background ==
Before the ready availability of a reliable synchronization gear, several methods were tried to mount a machine gun in a position from which it would be able to fire past rather than through the arc of the propeller. Even after reasonably reliable synchronization was available for closed bolt weapons such as the Vickers gun there were reasons for avoiding synchronization. Even the best synchronization gears were liable to failure, and there were special hazards in firing incendiary and explosive ammunition through the propeller arc. Some weapons, such as the Lewis gun, were not easy to synchronize at all. An alternative was to fire over the propeller, especially in the case of a biplane aircraft, where the structure of the upper wing formed a convenient base. A drawback was that such a mount was less robust than a mounting on the forward fuselage, and the accuracy of the gun, especially at long range, was affected by vibration. The main difficulty, however, was the need for the pilot or gunner to have access to the breech of the gun, to change drums or belts as well as to clear jams.

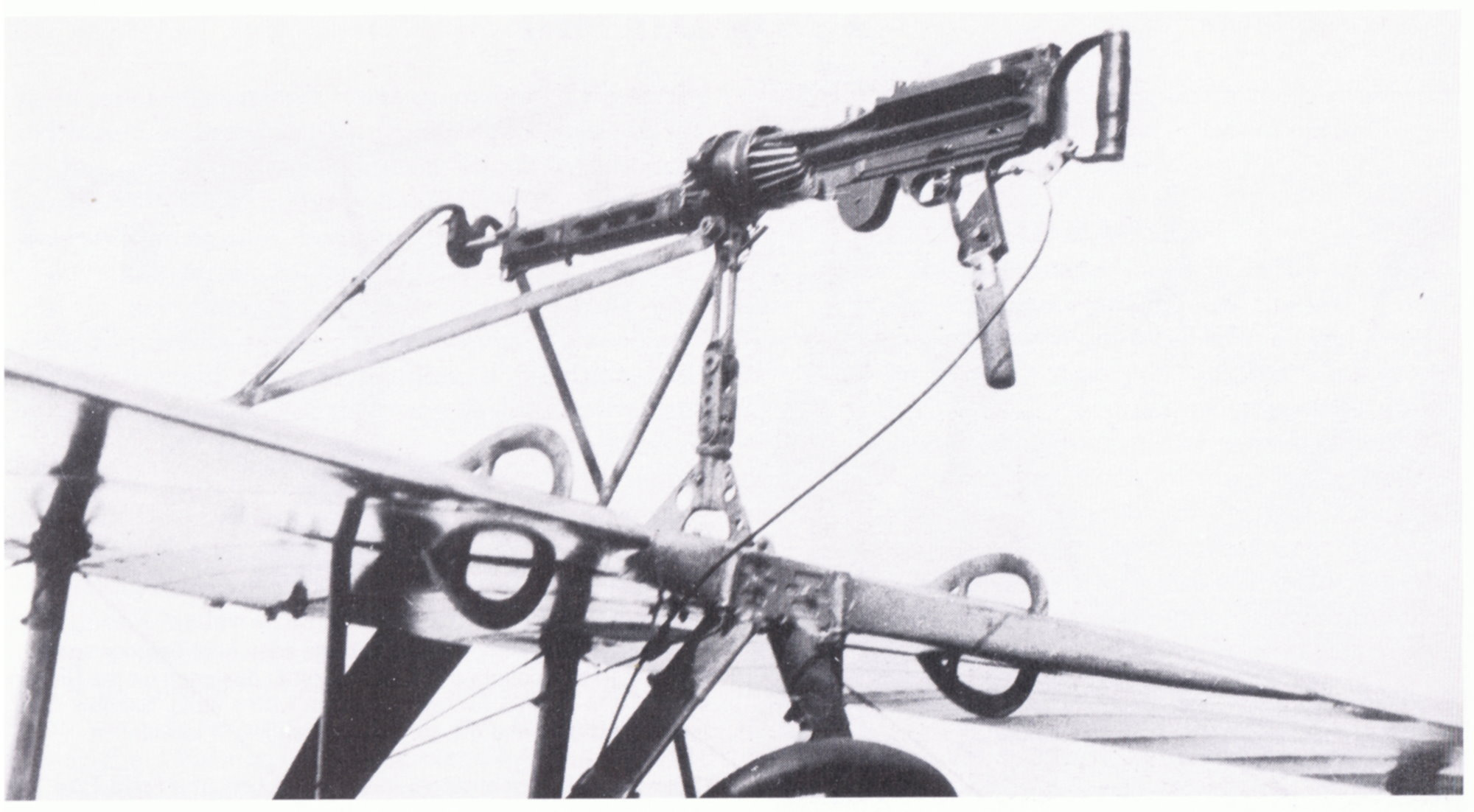
One of several arrangements used to mount an "over-wing" Lewis gun on a Nieuport fighter in French service

The earliest mountings for a Lewis gun on the top wing of a light scout aircraft were fixed, and either the inaccessibility of the breech was accepted, or drums were changed by the pilot standing up (in some cases having to stand on his seat) to reach the gun. A hinged arrangement, permitting the breech to be swung back and down into a position where the pilot could change drums while in his seat was preferable, and several versions of such mountings enabled the Lewis (or Hotchkiss) guns of the French Nieuport 11 fighters to tackle the German Fokker Eindeckers in early 1916. Typically, two hinges were fitted to a pillar type support for the breech of the gun. With the gun hinged back, the empty drum could be removed by being pulled back, rather than having to be lifted off the gun, while the second hinge brought the Lewis gun breech down into the cockpit. Various arrangements of metal springs or bungee cord assisted the pilot to return the gun to its firing position. Wing-mounted Lewis guns were a stop-gap in French squadrons, to be replaced as soon as possible with synchronised Vickers guns. British airmen, on the other hand, had various reasons for retaining the wing-mounted Lewis guns of their Nieuports.

== On Nieuport fighters ==
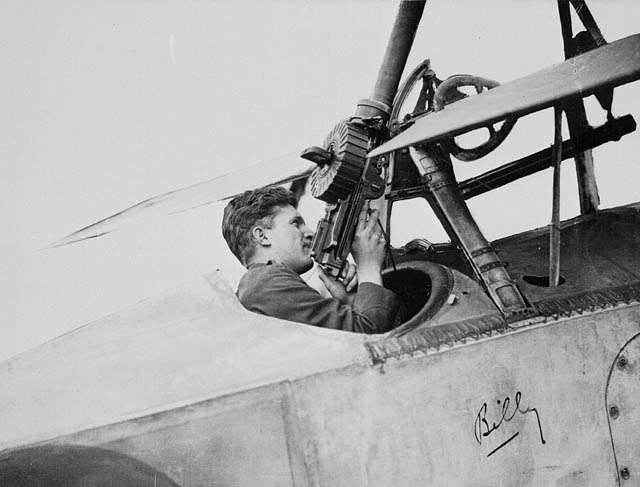
"Billy" Bishop demonstrates use of Foster Mounting to fire upwards. The "quadrant" of the mounting is visible immediately below the gun barrel.

In early 1916 Sergeant Foster of 11 Squadron RFC improved the French hinged mounting for the upper wing Lewis gun on a Nieuport 11 or 16, by replacing the awkward double hinge of the French mount with a quadrant-shaped I-beam rail. This rail became the feature of all later "Foster" mountings, and enabled the breech of the gun to slide back and down in one movement, bringing the breech conveniently in front of the pilot, and making it much easier to change ammunition drums or to clear stoppages.

The mounting also permitted the Lewis gun to be fired obliquely forwards and upwards, to attack an enemy aircraft from behind and below: a favourite tactic of several "ace" pilots, including Albert Ball. The Schräge Musik fitting used by German night fighter pilots in the Second World War used the same basic principle. When fired forwards, the trigger of the Lewis gun was controlled by a Bowden cable (see illustration at the top of the article); when fired upwards, the pistol grip was held to steady the weapon and it was fired with the trigger (as illustrated here).

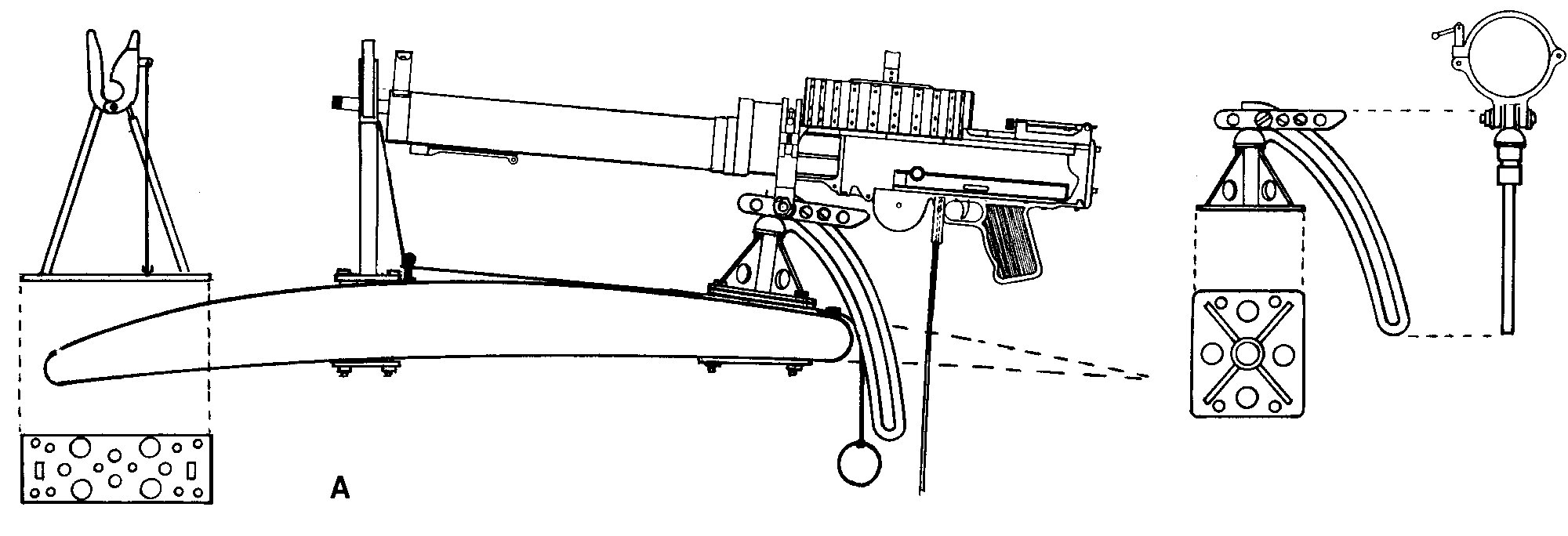
Diagram of the "Nieuport" version of the Foster Mounting from a contemporary maintenance manual

Some pilots complained of quadrants twisting or breaking when subject to the forceful and clumsy handling inevitable in aerial combat, and some used elastic cord to replace or supplement the original clock-type spring fitted to assist returning the gun to its forward firing position. In general, however, the mounting was highly successful: and for the RFC Nieuport squadrons at least much to be preferred to the unreliable early mechanical synchronisation gears. It remained in use by the British in the later Nieuport 17 and Nieuport 24, although some strengthening of the quadrant is evident in photographs.

== On the S.E.5 ==
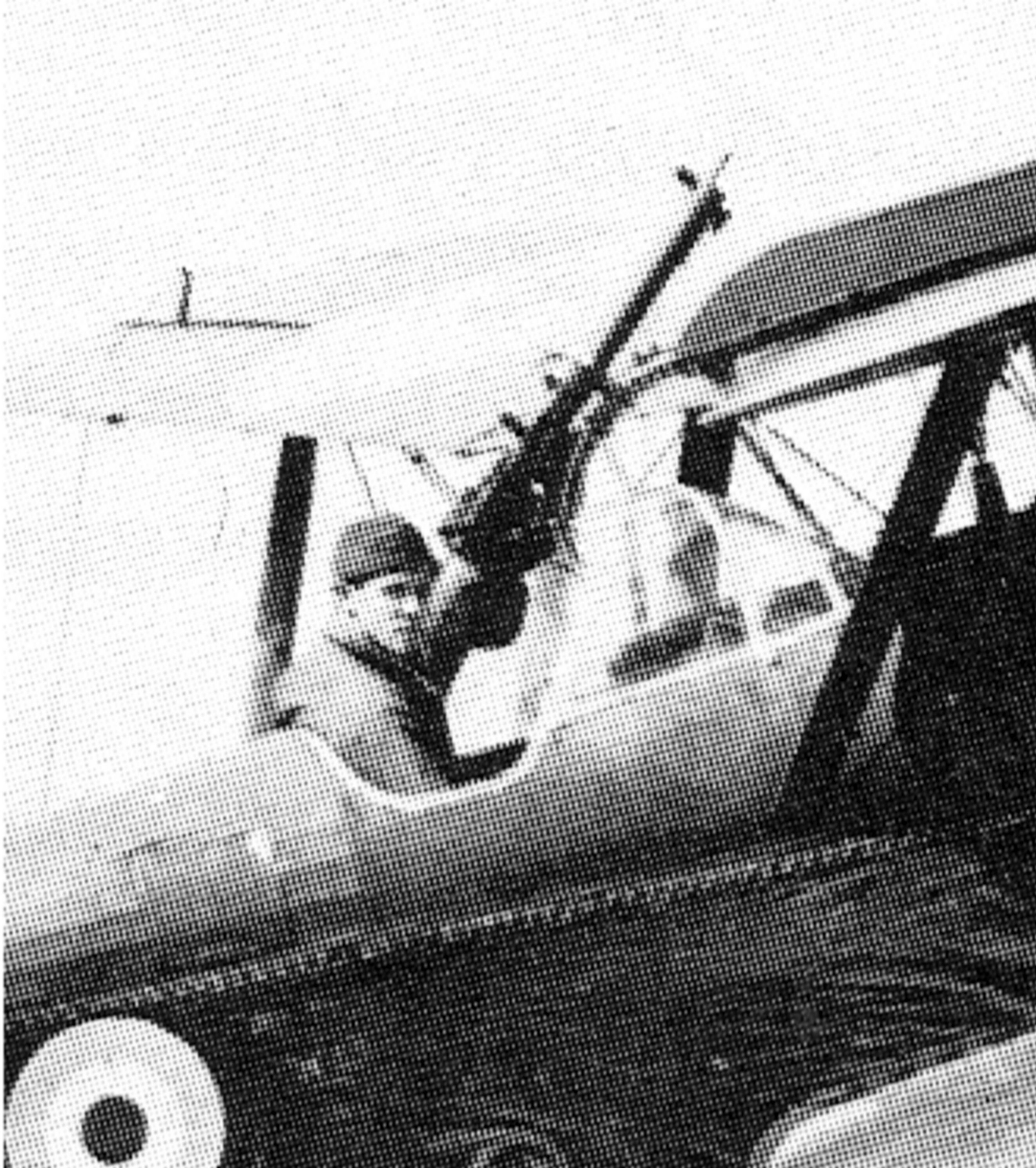
Albert Ball demonstrates the Foster mount in an early S.E.5 with original windscreen and seating position.

Due to the different disposition of the wings and fuselage, adaptation of the mounting to the S.E.5a was not straightforward. The "S.E.5" version of the mount required a much longer and more robust quadrant rail. When the S.E. was fitted with a geared engine, raising the thrustline and the top of the propeller arc, it was necessary to raise the mounting by the same amount, to ensure the line of fire cleared the propeller. While Albert Ball continued to use the upward firing technique for some of his last victories, other pilots remarked on the great skill and marksmanship needed to achieve success with this manoeuvre in an S.E.5. Several pilots remarked on the gymnastics required to change drums in a hurry, especially in the middle of a dogfight.

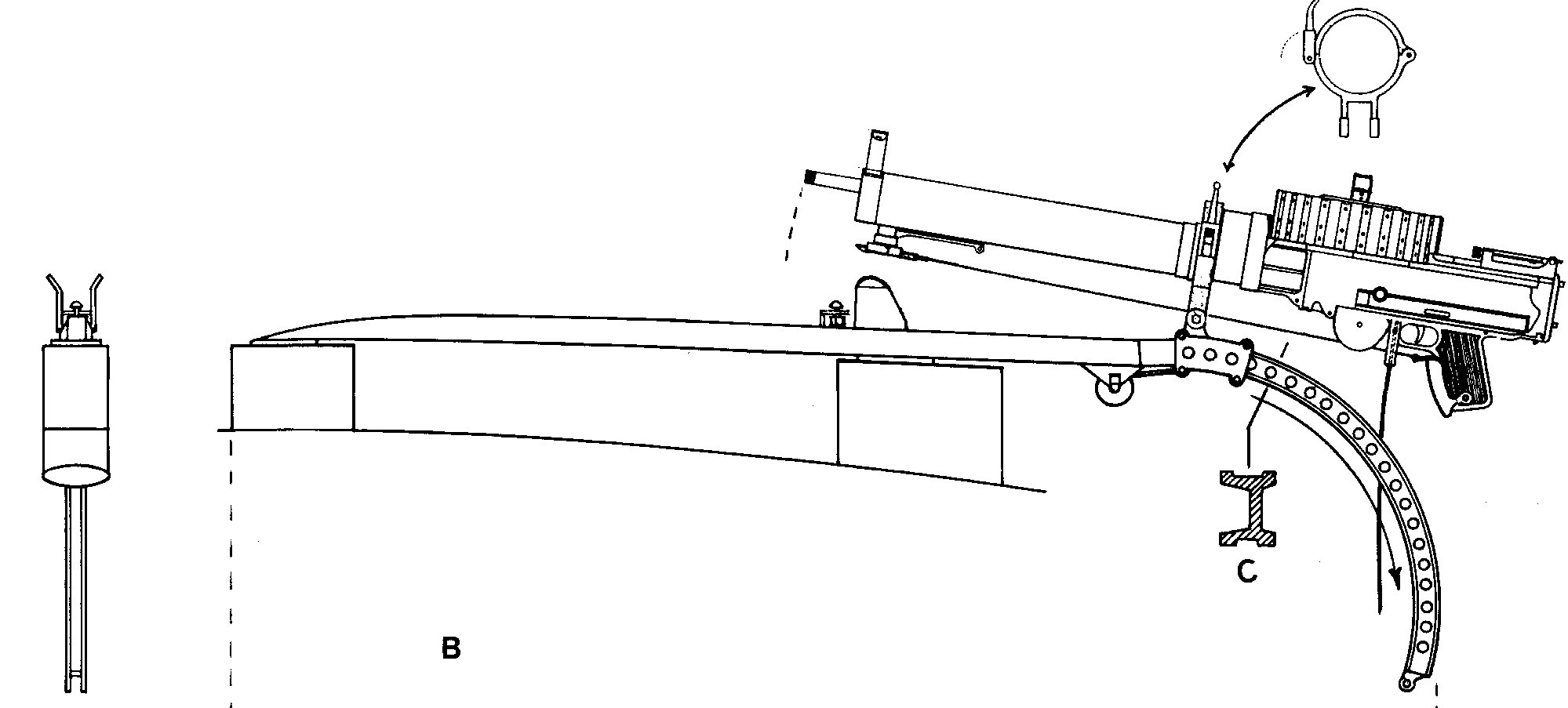
Diagram of the "S.E.5" version of the Foster mounting from a contemporary maintenance manual

Rather than being fitted instead of a synchronised weapon, the Foster-mounted Lewis in the S.E.5 was fitted in addition. The two guns were normally used together, both being aimed through an Aldis sight, implying a degree of harmonization; but in some respects this arrangement was less than ideal. Replacement of the "hybrid" S.E.5 armament with twin guns (either two Vickers or two Foster mounted Lewis guns) was considered, but it was calculated that the centre section of the upper wing would have required reinforcement to cope with the recoil and vibration of two Lewis guns firing simultaneously. Twin-gun versions of the hydraulic C.C. synchronisation gear were not available until late 1917, and the early examples were required to replace the inferior Sopwith-Kauper gears used in early Camels, so that the armament of the S.E.5a remained the same throughout its production life. On S.E.5s that were used by advanced training units in 1918 the Foster mounting proved amenable for the Hythe camera gun, one of the first of its kind. Reflections from the spinning propeller that may have interfered with pictures taken by a cowl mounted "gun" were avoided.

== On the Sopwith Camel ==
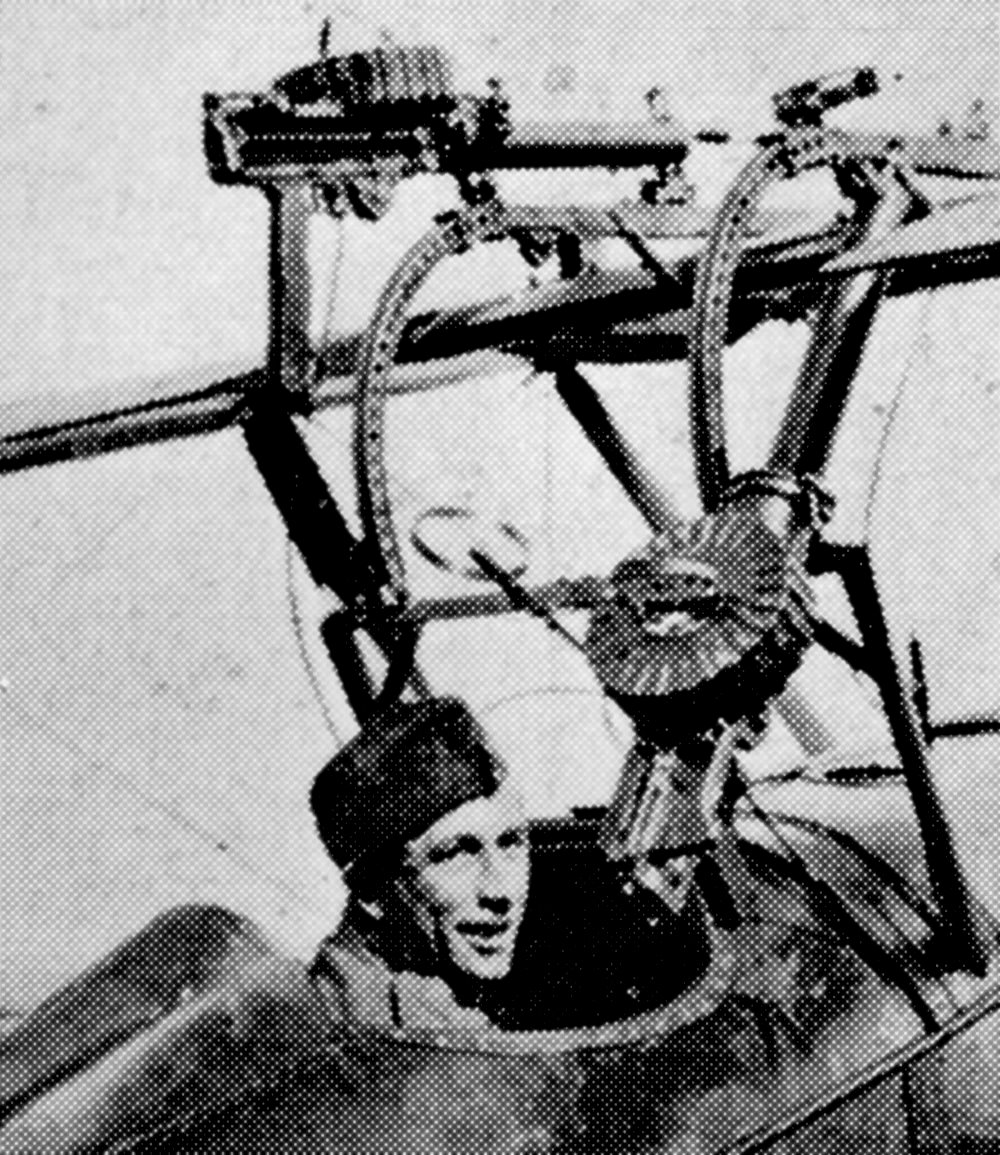
Twin Foster mountings on a specially modified Sopwith Camel ("Sopwith Comic")

The 2F.1 (the shipboard variant of the Camel), carried an over-wing Lewis gun, mainly as an anti-airship weapon. As the adaptation of either type of Foster mounting to a normal Camel was not feasible, a special mounting, officially termed the "Admiralty upper-plane mounting", became standard for the 2F.1.

To eliminate the muzzle-flash from cowling mounted guns that could blind a pilot at night, some of the F.1 Camels used as night fighters were modified to take Foster mountings. The positions of the pilot's seat and the main fuel tank were swapped, moving the pilot well aft of the upper wing. Twin Foster mountings were fitted, and the quadrant rails were either attached to a special "goal post" bracket, or braced by a simple cross brace between them. The starboard Lewis gun in our illustration has been demounted from its rail and fixed to fire upwards without having to be held and fired by hand, although it can not be raised to fire forward from this position.

== Other types and experimental fittings ==
The unofficial "Sopwith Comic" name was also applied to a field modified Sopwith 1½ Strutter used by some home defence squadrons. The cockpit was moved back behind the wings, and one or two Lewis guns, either mounted on Foster mountings or fixed to fire upwards, outside the arc of the propeller, replaced the synchronised Vickers.

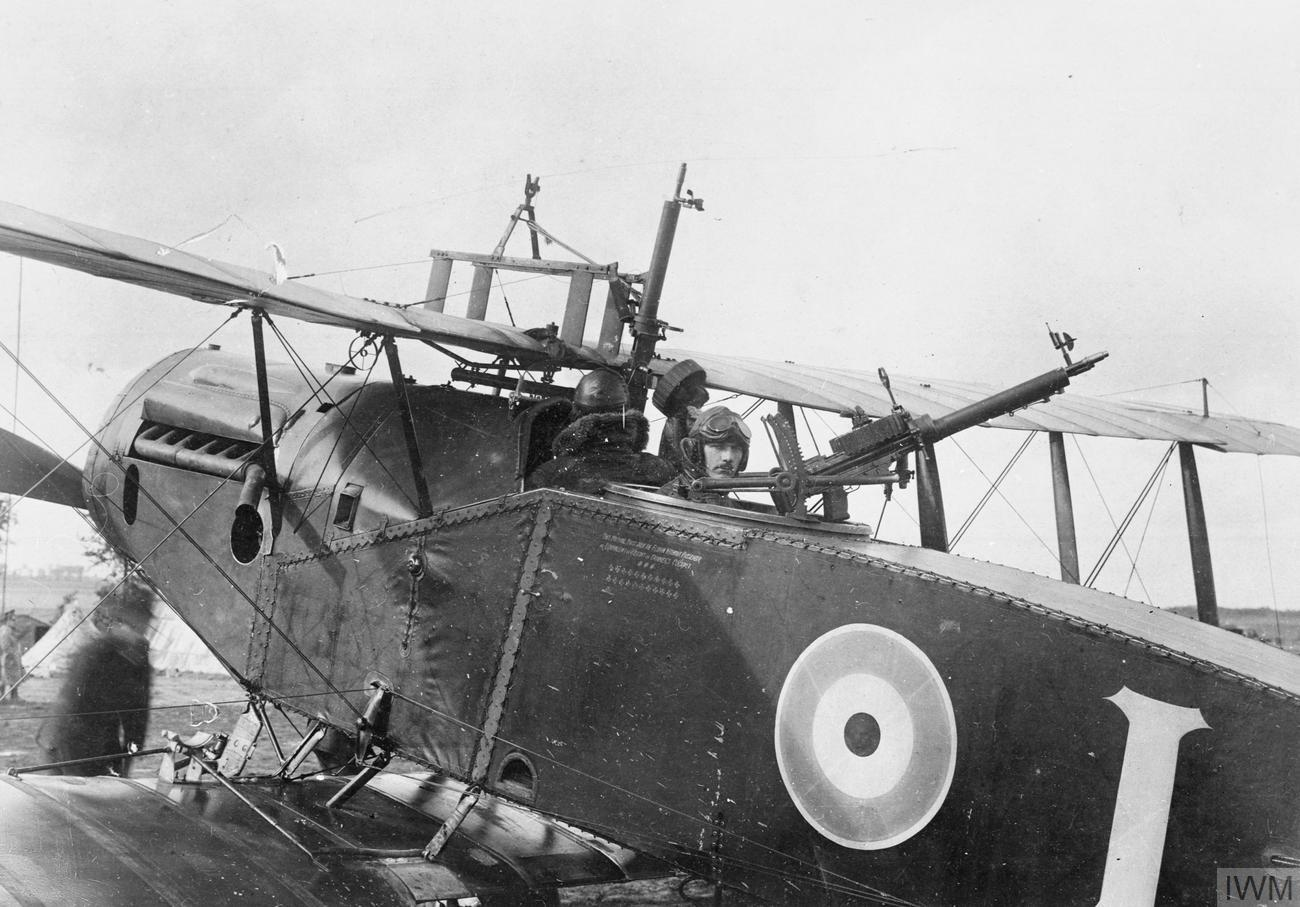
Attempt to adapt a Foster mounting to a Bristol F.2b Fighter

The night fighter version of the Avro 504K was also armed with a "modified S.E 5a" type Foster mounted Lewis gun (see illustration at the head of this article). This aircraft had a much larger gap between the top of the fuselage and the upper wing than most types fitted with this mounting and must have proved very awkward to use. On the B.E.12b, intended as a night fighter, over-wing Lewis guns relied on makeshift mountings, including one that resembled the original double hinged mounting on early French Nieuports.

Attempts to add one or two Foster mounted Lewis guns to the Bristol Fighter were not successful. Among other problems, the mounting caused interference with the pilot's compass, which was mounted on the trailing edge of the upper wing, a difficulty which persisted even when the mounting was offset to starboard.

== See also ==
- Scarff ring
