= Nottingham Hospital for Women =

Nottingham Hospital for Women may refer to three different former hospitals in the English city of Nottingham:

- Nottingham Castle Gate Hospital (1875-1923)
- Nottingham Women's Hospital (1923-1981)
- Samaritan Hospital Nottingham (1885-1923)
