= Lenton Priory =

Cluniac monastic house in England

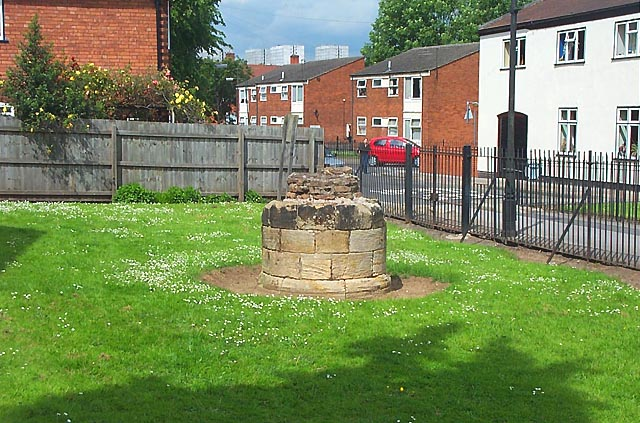
- The remains of a stone column from the priory

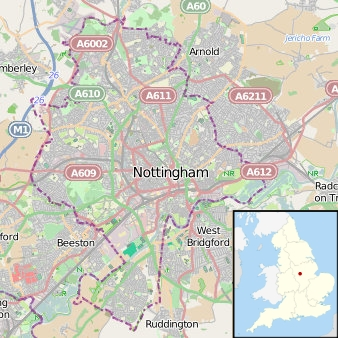
- Location within Greater Nottingham
- Interactive map of Lenton Priory

Monastery information
- Order: Cluniac
- Established: C.1102-8
- Disestablished: 1538
- Mother house: Cluny Abbey
- Dedication: Holy Trinity

People
- Founder: William Peverel

Site
- Location: Lenton, Nottingham, Nottinghamshire
- Coordinates: 52.943611°N 1.178611°W
- Grid reference: SK5518938819

Lenton Priory was a Cluniac monastic house in Nottinghamshire, founded by William Peverel circa 1102-8. The priory was granted a large endowment of property in Nottinghamshire and Derbyshire by its founder, which became the cause of violent disagreement following its seizure by the crown and its reassignment to Lichfield Cathedral. The priory was home mostly to French monks until the late 14th century when the priory was freed from the control of its foreign mother-house. From the 13th century the priory struggled financially and was noted for "its poverty and indebtedness". The priory was dissolved as part of King Henry VIII's Dissolution of the Monasteries.

== History ==
=== Foundation ===
The priory was founded by William Peverel circa 1102-8 in the manor of Lenton, Nottingham, about 1½ miles south-west of the town of Nottingham and was dedicated to the Holy Trinity. The foundation charter states that Peverel founded it "out of love of divine worship and for the good of the souls of his lord King William (i.e. William the Conqueror), of his wife Queen Matilda, of their son King William and of all their and his ancestors". The priory was an "alien establishment" and thus owed allegiance to a foreign mother house. Lenton's mother-house was Cluny Abbey in France. Usually a priory would pay a proportion of its income to its mother-house; however, Peverel established in the foundation charter that Lenton Priory would be free from the obligation to pay tribute to Cluny, "save the annual payment of a mark of silver as an acknowledgement".

William Peverel gave Lenton Priory a substantial endowment which included: the townships of Lenton, Keighton, Morton and Radford (all in Nottingham), Courteenhall, Northamptonshire, and all of their appurtenances and seven mills; land and woodland in Newthorpe and Papplewick; control of the churches of St Mary, St Peter and St Nicholas, all in the town of Nottingham; the churches at Langar, Linby and Radford; the tithes raised from Peverel's fisheries throughout Nottingham; portions of the tithes from his lands throughout the Peak District including those from Ashford, Bakewell, Bradwell, Buxton, Callow, Chelmorton, Cowdale, Darnall, Dunningestede, Fernilee, Holme, Hucklow, Newbold, Quatford, Shallcross, Stanton, Sterndale, Tideswell and Wormhill; all the tithes raised from his colts and fillies in his stud-farms in the Peak District; the tithes from the lead and venison from his lands in Derbyshire; part of the tithes from Blisworth and Duston and the churches of Courteenhall, Harlestone, Irchester and Rushden, all in Northamptonshire; and the church at Foxton, in Leicestershire.

Although it is believed Peverel did give these gifts to the priory, the charter of foundation which records these gifts is believed to be a forgery. The dates on the charter are implausible and the document is believed not to be contemporaneous.

In the 13th century, the priory received a gift from Philip Marc, Sheriff of Nottingham under King John, with the condition that the priory should look after his body and soul.

The priory was given Royal Confirmation Charters by King Henry I, King Stephen, King Henry II and King John. These charters confirm the priory's earlier endowments and reveal additional gifts including: The church of Wigston in Leicestershire by Robert de Beaumont, 1st Earl of Leicester; tithes from the Peak Forest, Derbyshire, by William de Ferrers; the churches of Ossington, Nottinghamshire and Horsley, Derbyshire, and half of the church of Cotgrave, Notts, by Hugh de Buron and his son Hugh Meschines; the church of Nether Broughton, Leics (and its appurtenances, a chapel and 15 acres of land) by Richard Bussell; The Manors of Holme and Dunston, both in Derbyshire, by Matthew de Hathersage; and a moiety of the church of Attenborough, Nottinghamshire, "the land of Reginald in Chilwell", Barton in Fabis church, and part of the tithes in Bunny and Bradmore, by Odo de Bunny.

King Henry II's first charter granted the priory freedom from taxes, tolls and customs duties. In his second charter he granted them an eight-day fair to celebrate St Martin's Day. Henry III's charter extended this fair to twelve days in duration. In 1199 King John issued a charter allowing the monks to take a cart of dead wood from "the forest of Bestwood" every day. In another charter towards the end of his reign, King John granted the monks game ("harts, hinds, bucks, does, wild boars, and hares") from the royal forests in Nottingham and Derby.

==== Endowment disputes ====
The priory had severe problems with Peverel's donations following the seizure of the Peverel family estates by the crown, during the reign of King Henry II. King Henry granted the Peverel families lands within the Peak District to his son, John Count of Mortain (the future King John). On ascending the throne, John transferred this property to the Bishop of Coventry and Lichfield and in turn it passed to the Dean and Chapter of Lichfield Cathedral. This transfer began approximately 300 years of disagreement between the Priory and Cathedral about who was rightful owner of the property. Litigation continued throughout this period, including suits in the Vatican Court on several occasions.

This disagreement became violent when in 1250-1, the monks of Lenton Priory armed themselves and attempted to steal wool and lambs from the disputed parish of Tideswell, Derbyshire, which Lichfield controlled. Pre-empting the monks' attack the Dean of Lichfield ordered the wool and sheep to be kept within the nave of the village church; however, the monks of Lenton did not honour the church's sanctuary rights and broke into the building. A fight ensued and 18 lambs were killed within the church, either trampled under the horses' hooves or butchered by the attackers. The monks managed to carry off 14 of the lambs.

In another similar attack around the same time, the monks used violence to steal geese, hay and oats. These attacks caused the Bishop of Lichfield to appeal again to the Pope. Pope Innocent IV assembled a commission which met in 1252 at St. Mary's Church in Leicester. The commission included the warden of the Greyfriars of Leicester, the Archdeacon of Chester, and the Prior of the Dominicans of London. The commission ruled that Lenton Priory should be fined 100 marks on top of the £60 they had already paid Lichfield Cathedral in "compensation for the damage". The commission attempted to prevent further violent outbreaks by allotting the priory a portion of the tithes from some of the disputed parishes. This, however, provided less than 25 years of peace, as the dispute was reignited in 1275 and was "frequently renewed up to the time of the dissolution of the religious houses".

=== 13th and 14th centuries ===
In 1228 the priory church tower collapsed. The following year King Henry III granted the monks quarry rights in the Royal Forest in order to get stone to rebuild the tower. Henry III made numerous other donations to the priory to allow further building and restoration including: oak to make roofing shingle for the monks' dormitory, (in 1232) thirty Sherwood oaks to build the priory church, and (in 1249) a royal licence to quarry stone from Sherwood Forest to construct the priory church.

The majority of the monks at Lenton came from France. Not used to the colder climate in England, in the winter of 1257/58, Pope Alexander IV had to give permission for the monks to wear caps during church services due to the "vehement cold".

By 1262 the priory was considerably in debt. The priory's accounts were inspected by Henry, Prior of Bermondsey, and John, Prior of the French house of Gassicourt, on behalf of the Abbot of Cluny. Their inspection reveal the priory was home to twenty-two monks and that the priory was about £1,000 (equivalent to £1,275,656 in 2025) in debt. This amount was a substantial: around three times the priory's gross annual income, as demonstrated by the 1291 tax records of Pope Nicholas IV, which record the priory as having an annual income of only £339 1s. 2½d. (equivalent to £336,610 in 2025).

As an alien priory owing allegiance to a mother-house in France, during wars with France the priory's income was seized by the Crown. This happened repeatedly in the 14th century, until in 1392 the priory was removed from the control of its mother-house (i.e. made denizen).

The priory is believed to have had the finest set of guest-chambers in the region and received several royal visits, including by Henry III in 1230, Edward I in 1302 and 1303, Edward II in 1307 and 1323, and Edward III in 1336.

The priory had not solved its debt problems by the beginning of the 14th century. By May 1313 the priory was noted for "its poverty and indebtedness". King Edward II placed the priory under his protection and appointed a keeper to oversee the priory's affairs.

Lenton Priory had previously controlled the Chapel of Saint James (located on St James Street, Nottingham). However in 1316 whilst visiting Clipston, Nottinghamshire, King Edward II took the chapel from Lenton and gave it to the Nottingham Whitefriars, of whom he was very fond.

=== Dissolution ===
The Valor Ecclesiasticus of 1535 records the priory as having a gross income of £387 10s. 10½d., together with "considerable" outgoings.

Lenton's last prior was Nicholas Heath (or Hethe). He was appointed in 1535, having gained the position due to his connection to Thomas Cromwell. Numerous letters to Cromwell exist, from Heath's time as prior.

Prior Heath was thrown into prison in February 1538, along with many of his monks. They were accused of high treason, most likely under the Verbal Treasons Act of December 1534. In March, the prior with eight of his monks (Ralph Swenson, Richard Bower, Richard Atkinson, Christopher Browne, John Trewruan, John Adelenton, William Berry, and William Gylham) and four labourers of Lenton were indicted for treason and executed. Cromwell's private notes reveal Heath's fate (to be executed) was sealed before he had gone to trial.

The prior and monk Ralph Swenson were executed first. Monk William Gylham and the four labourers were sentenced to be hanged, drawn and quartered. The executions took place in Nottingham (thought to have been in the market place) and its surroundings, including in front of the priory itself. Some of the quarters of those executed were displayed outside the priory.

The priory was dissolved in 1538. As the monks and prior had been executed, none of the survivors were given a pension; unusually none of the servants of the priory were given a pension either, and the five paupers who lived within the priory were thrown out onto the streets, "penniless".

=== Priors of Lenton ===
- Humphrey, temp. Henry I
- Philip
- Alexander, occurs c. 1189
- Peter, occurs 1200-1214
- Damascenus
- Roger, 1230
- Roger de Normanton, occurs 1241
- Hugh Bluet, occurs 1251
- Roger Norman, 1259
- Matthew, 1269
- Peter de Siriniaco, occurs 1281-1287
- Reginald de Jora, occurs 1289-1290
- William, occurs 1291 and 1306
- Stephen de Moerges, 1309
- Reginald de Crespy, 1313
- Geoffrey, 1316
- William de Pinnebury, occurs 1324
- Guy de Arlato, occurs 1333
- Astorgius de Gorciis, occurs 1336-7 & 1349
- Peter de Abbeville, occurs 1355
- Geoffrey de Rochero, occurs 1389
- Richard Stafford, died 1414
- Thomas Elmham, 1414
- John Elmham 1426
- John Mydylburgh, 1450
- Thomas Wollore, 1458
- Richard Dene, 1481
- John Ilkeston, occurs 1500-1505
- Thomas Gwyllam, occurs 1512-1516
- Thomas Nottingham alias Hobson, 1525
- John Annesley, 1531
- Nicholas Heath, 1535

=== Lenton Fair ===
The second royal charter King Henry II granted the priory gave the monks permission to hold an eight-day fair starting on The Feast of Saint Martin: 11 November. In 1232, King Henry III's charter extended the length of the fair to twelve days.

The fair provided a large proportion of the priory's annual income: in 1387 providing £35 of the priory's £300 annual income.

The fair caused numerous disputes with the mayor and burgesses of the town of Nottingham.
The town and priory reached an agreement around 1300 where by no markets were to be held within Nottingham during the period in the Lenton fair. In return the people of Nottingham were given special rates to hire booths at the Lenton fair and were freed from their tolls to Lenton Priory during the time of the fair. Each booth measured 8 ft by 8 ft.

Trade	Booth Hire Price
Apothecaries, Cloth merchants, Mercers, Pilchers (makers of fur garments)	12d.
Those selling blacks (Blakkes) and ordinary cloths	8d.
Those selling iron (with extra ground available to hire for 2d.)	4d.

The Fair continued after the demise of the Priory, though its length was gradually reduced. Its emphasis slowly changed, and in 1584 it was described as a horse-fair when servants of Mary, Queen of Scots attended. By the 17th century the Fair had acquired a reputation as a great fair for all sorts of horses. In the 19th century it was largely frequented by farmers and horse dealers. The Fair finally ceased at the beginning of the 20th century.

== History following Dissolution ==
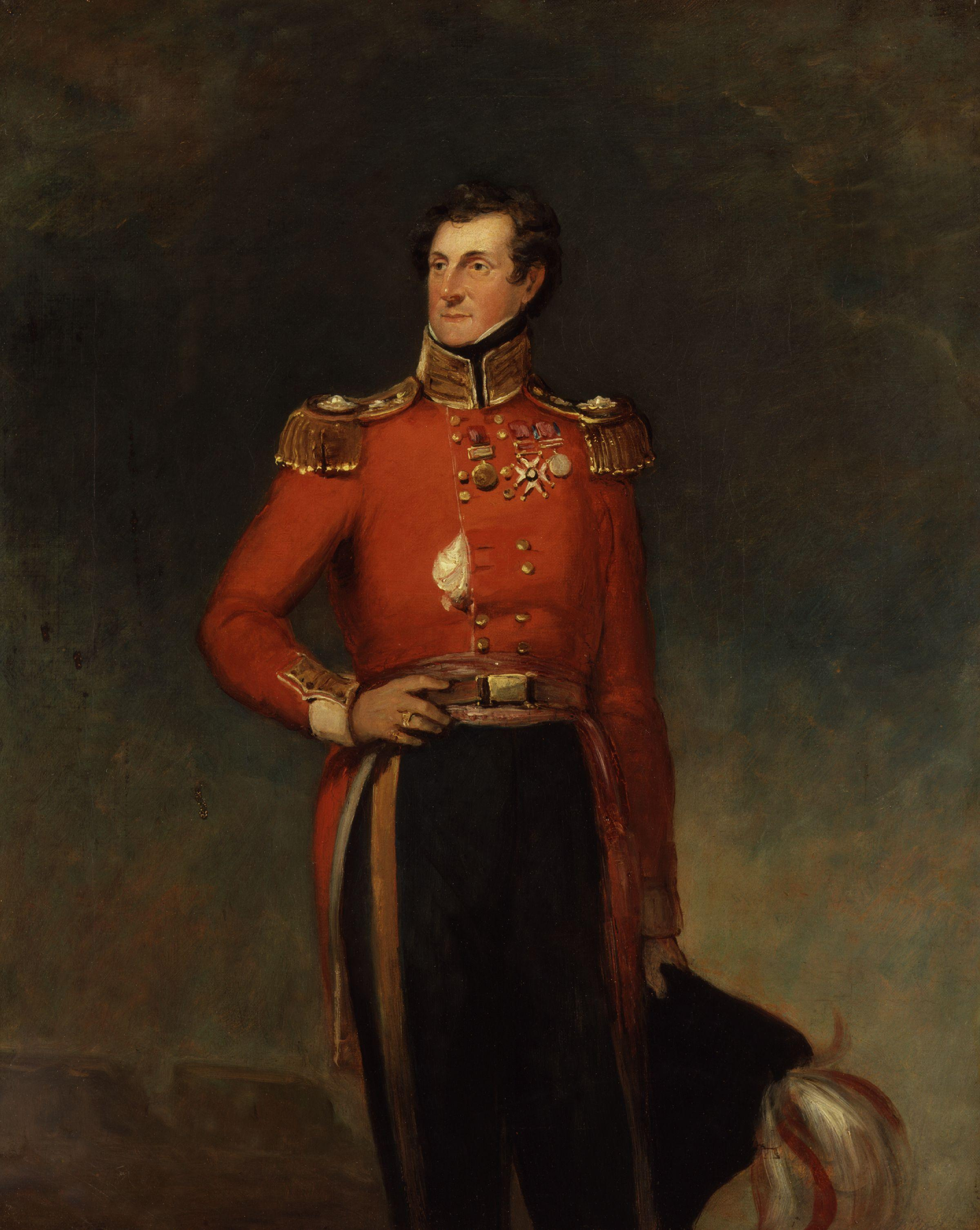
Sempronius Stretton's portrait by William Salter

The monastery's lands passed between numerous different owners after the dissolution.

The area was bought by William Stretton in 1802 and he built a large house called "The Priory". William was interested in antiquities and he is known to have removed old architectural materials whilst his house was being constructed. The funds for the house may well have come from the buildings that he and his father built in the Nottingham area. When William died he left the house to his son Sempronius. Colonel Sempronius Stretton died in 1842 and left the house to his brother Severus William Lynam Stretton. Neither of the sons regarded the Priory as home and Severus sold the house. It was bought by the Sisters of Nazareth in 1880. The Sisters of Nazareth sold the property in the early years of the twenty-first century, and the site was redeveloped for housing.

In 2020 Lenton Priory was excavated by archaeologists for the More4 television programme The Great British Dig, which was broadcast on 3 March 2021. They uncovered an unrecorded medieval wall at the east end of the priory, which was interpreted as a previously-unknown Lady Chapel which had been added to the original Norman building.

== Remains of Lenton Priory today ==
- Priory Church of St. Anthony, Lenton is thought to incorporate elements of the chapel of the monastic hospital.
- Lower courses of a substantial stone column survive in situ where Old Church Street meets Priory Street
- The 12th-century font survives in Holy Trinity Church, Lenton.
- Floor tiles in Nottingham Castle Museum.
- Stained glass in Nuthall Church.

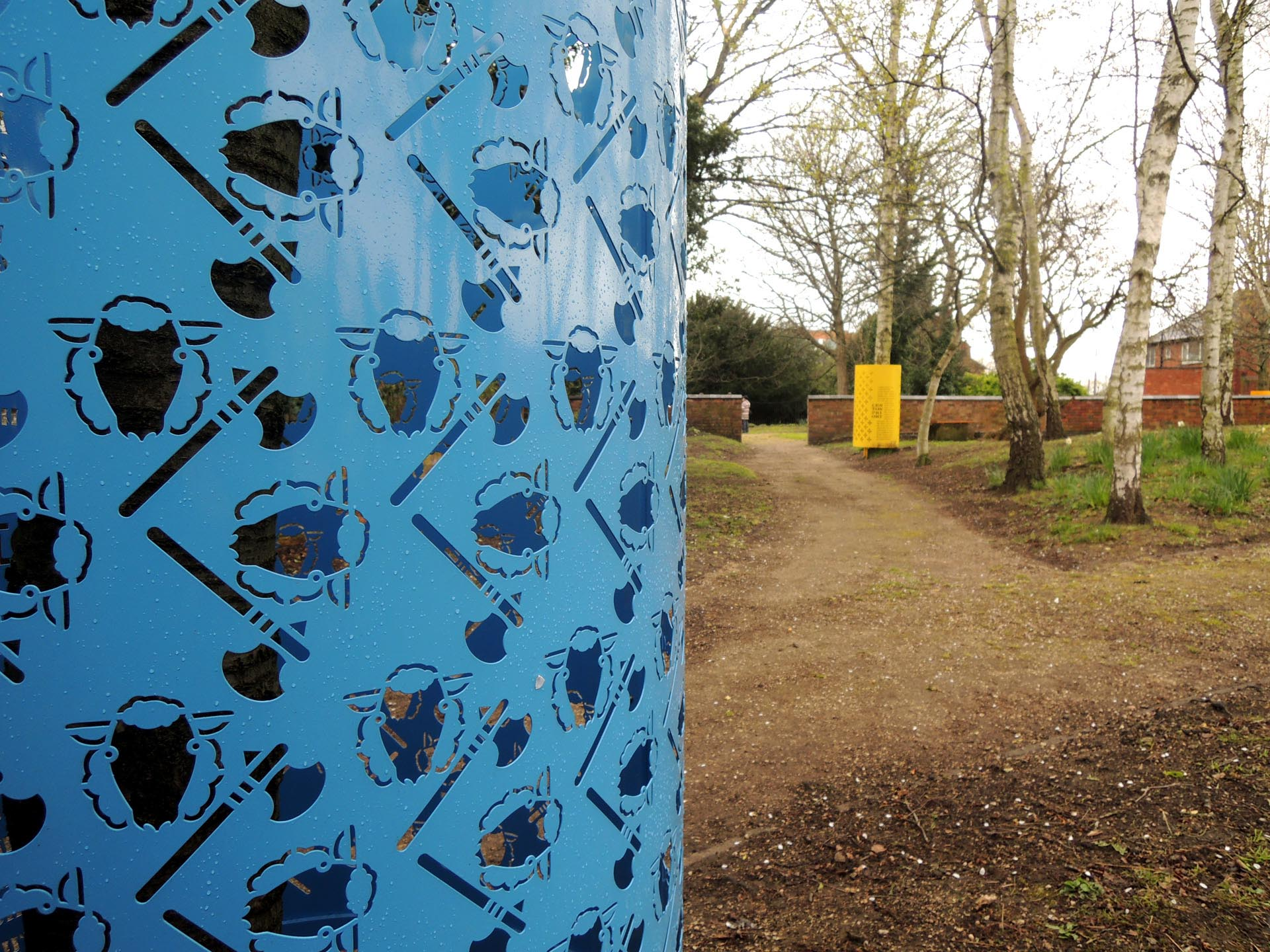
'Lenton Priory Pillars' artwork on the site of Lenton Priory.

In 2018 part of the site was declared a sculpture park with the commissioning of three public artworks by Nottingham Council. These include 'Lenton Priory Stone' by James Winnet. The stone's size and the style of the carvings draw on the 12th century Norman baptismal font from the Priory, one of the last tangible links to the site, which can be seen half a mile away in Holy Trinity Church, Lenton. The 'Lenton Priory Pilllars' by Adrian Riley are a series of metal columns around trees on the site that echo the architecture of the former priory. Each has a pattern and accompanying text explaining part of the priory's history.

== See also ==
- Listed buildings in Nottingham (Dunkirk and Lenton ward)
