= Sempronius =

Sempronius may refer to:

- Sempronius, the nomen of the Roman gens Sempronia
- Sempronius, a character in the play The Apple Cart
- Sempronius, New York
- Sempronius, Texas
- Sempronius Stretton, a British Army officer and artist
- Sempronius H. Boyd, U.S. Congressman from Missouri and U.S. Civil War Colonel.
- Sempronius, a fictional Roman senator in Cato, a Tragedy by Joseph Addison
