= St Mary's Church, Wollaton Park =

Coordinates: 52°56′50″N 01°11′09″W

St. Mary's Church, Wollaton Park
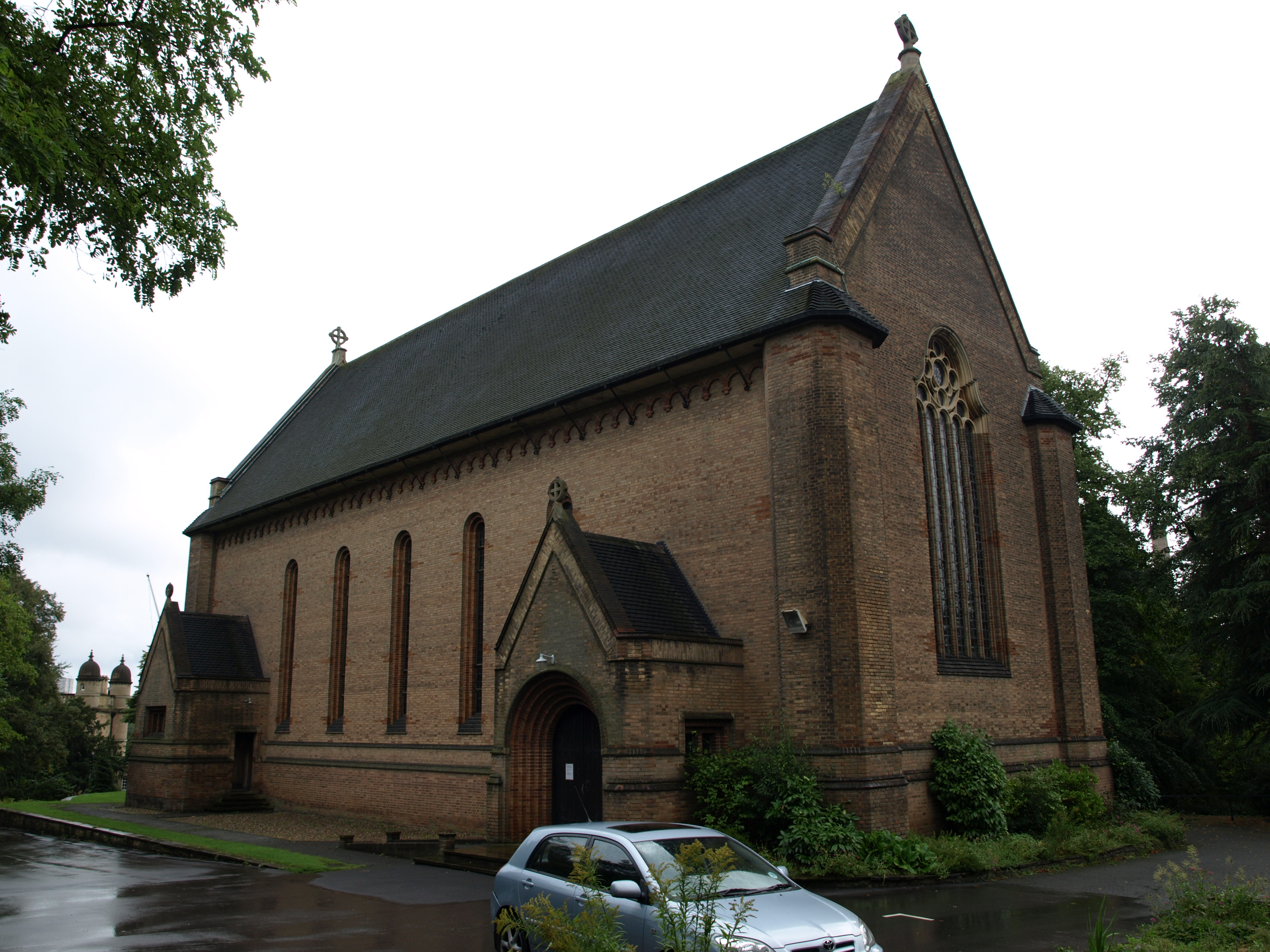
- St. Mary's Church, Wollaton Park
- St. Mary's Church, Wollaton Park
- Denomination: Church of England
- Churchmanship: Conservative Evangelical
- Website: www.stmaryswollatonpark.co.uk

History
- Dedication: St. Mary

Administration
- Province: York
- Diocese: Southwell and Nottingham
- Parish: Wollaton

Clergy
- Bishop(s): The Rt Revd Paul Williams, Bishop of Southwell and Nottingham
- Vicar: Vacant

St. Mary's Church, Wollaton Park, is a parish church in the Church of England. It is located in Wollaton, Nottingham.

== History ==
St. Mary's Wollaton Park was designed by the architect Thomas Cecil Howitt; building started in 1937 and was finished in 1939. The stained glass windows were made in London by A. J. Dix. The baptismal font was modelled on that of Lenton Abbey, now in Holy Trinity Church, Lenton.

The church was originally served by curates from Holy Trinity Church, Lenton, but in 1957 it became a parish church in its own right.

== List of incumbents ==
- Revd E. Strickland
- Revd Robin Fletcher, c. 1963-1973
- Revd Malcolm Kitchen c. 1973-1988
- Revd Frank Sudworth
- ?
- Revd Henry Curran 2007–2021
- Revd Robert Brewis 2023-Present

== Controversies ==
In December 2024, a Bishop Disciplinary Tribunal found that the Revd Henry Curran's conduct was unbecoming or inappropriate to the office and work of a clerk in Holy Orders. The Tribunal noted various mitigating factors, and ruled that he could continue in his ministry (which had now moved to another church), but should be trained and supervised by an experienced Priest for two years.

== Organ ==
The organ was built by J. W. Walker & Sons Ltd in 1938. The instrument has been erected in a divided position at the west end of the church, the detached console being placed at rear of the choir stalls on the south side of the chancel.

== See also ==
- Listed buildings in Nottingham (Dunkirk and Lenton ward)
