= Samuel Stretton =

British builder and architect

Samuel Stretton (1731 – 11 May 1811) was a builder and architect in Nottingham who is noted for building the first powered cotton mill.

== Family ==
He appears to have been born at Longdon Staffordshire in 1731 or 1732 and moved to Lenton in 1750, where he was married and where all his children were baptized.

On 14 July 1754 he married Elizabeth Wombwell in Lenton. The marriage produced 6 children:

- William Stretton April 1755 – 12 March 1828
- Ann 1757 – 11 April 1820
- Elizabeth 1759
- Mary 1760
- Samuel Stretton 1761
- Sarah 1763

His wife Elizabeth died on 22 February 1802 and was buried at Lenton. He died on 11 May 1811, and was buried on 16 May at Lenton.

== Career ==
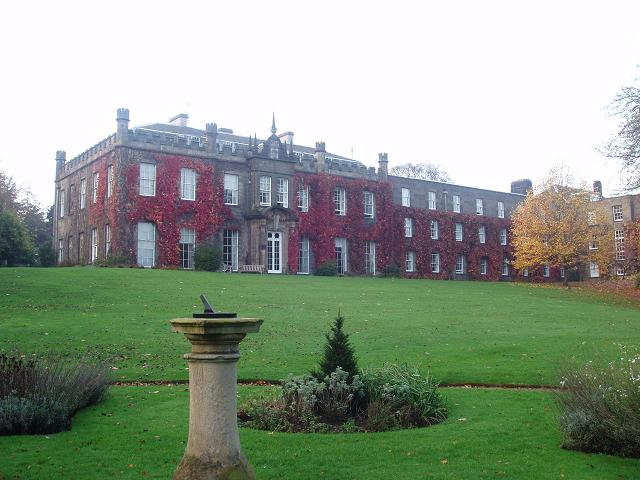
Lenton Hall built in 1792, now part of Hugh Stewart Hall at the University of Nottingham

He carried on the business of a builder to Nottingham, at first on his own account, and later in partnership with his son William Stretton,

Buildings by Samuel Stretton include:

- 1769–1772 the first powered Cotton Mill erected in England, driven by horses turning a capstan.
- 1776 Colwick Hall
- 1777 the Grand Stand on Nottingham Racecourse.
- 1789 Nottingham Town Jail.
- 1792 Evans, Storer and Green Brewery, Poplar Place, Lenton, Nottingham at a cost of £15,000 (equivalent to £2,176,747 as of 2023),. This brewery only survived for two years.
- 1792 Lenton Hall, now part of Hugh Stewart Hall at the University of Nottingham.
