= Listed buildings in Nottingham (Dunkirk and Lenton ward) =

Dunkirk and Lenton is a former electoral ward in the city of Nottingham, England. The ward contained 29 listed buildings that are recorded in the National Heritage List for England. Of these, five are listed at Grade II*, the middle of the three grades, and the others are at Grade II, the lowest grade. The ward contains the areas of Lenton and Dunkirk to the west and southwest of the centre of the city. The listed buildings include churches and items in and around the churchyards, houses and associated buildings, the remains of Lenton Priory, a gateway and a nearby water pump, a former school, later a Sikh temple, and the master's house, a war memorial, a group of houses for the families of local servicemen and associated structures, buildings around the entrance to the boating lake in Highfields Park, and an industrial headquarters building.

== Key ==
Grade	Criteria
II*	Particularly important buildings of more than special interest
II	Buildings of national importance and special interest

== Buildings ==
Name and location	Photograph	Date	Notes	Grade
Base of pier, Lenton Priory; 52.94306°N 1.17868°W		1102–08	The ruined base of the easterly pier of the ambulatory of the priory church. It consists of a round stone column with a chamfered base, about 1 metre (3 ft 3 in) high.	II
Priory Church of St Anthony, Lenton; 52.94379°N 1.17870°W		c. 1108	The oldest part of the church is the chancel, which was part of a chapel of Lenton Priory, and the rest of the church, designed by Evans and Jolley, dates from 1883. The church is built in stone with slate roofs, and consists of a nave with a clerestory, north and south aisles, a chancel and a vestry. The west gable has angle buttresses and a square wooden bell turret with a lead-covered pyramidal spire.	II
Remaining walls, Lenton Priory; 52.94314°N 1.17929°W		Early 12th century	This consists of fragments of the wall of the north aisle and the north transept of the priory, and is in stone with chamfered coping. It extends for about 30 metres (98 ft) with two corners, and has an average height of 1.5 metres (4 ft 11 in).	II
Manor House; 52.94764°N 1.17959°W		Late 17th century	Cottages combined into a house, in red brick with tile roofs. There are two storeys and attics, and blocks of three and two bays, the right block lower. In the left block is a canted bay window, the other windows are casements with Gothic glazing bars, and in the attic are three shouldered gabled dormers. In the lower wing is a French window and casement windows, to the right are single storey carriage houses converted into garages, and at the rear is a double-gabled wing. Inside the house is an inglenook fireplace.	II
Jasmine Cottage; 52.94688°N 1.17813°W	—	c. 1800	A house, once used as a Methodist meeting house, in brick, partly painted, with dentilled eaves, and roofs of tile and slate with coped gables. There are two storeys, and two blocks with two bays each. The left block contains a porch and sash windows, and the slightly recessed right block, has casement windows. On the front facing the road is a round-arched window.	II
Churchyard wall and gates, Priory Church of St Anthony, Lenton; 52.94403°N 1.17870°W		1811	The wall enclosing the churchyard is in stone with gabled coping. At the northwest corner is a pair of square gate piers with rebated caps and wrought iron lamp holders, and between them is a pair of scroll-topped wrought iron gates.	II
Chest tomb 52.94365°N 1.17940°W		1816	The tomb of Anne Browne Milnes and Herbert Foxcroft is in the churchyard of the Priory Church of St Anthony, Lenton. It is in stone, and has a moulded base, rebated corners with panelled pilasters, a moulded arched top, and inscribed slate tablets.	II
Lenton Lodge and bollards 52.94735°N 1.18532°W		1823–25	The lodge, originally a gateway to Wollaton Park, was designed by Jeffry Wyatville. It is in stone with lead roofs, and has a central gatehouse with three storeys and three bays. In the middle is a two-storey round-arched carriage entrance flanked by round-arched pedestrian entrances, over which are windows with strapwork panels. Above is a panel with a bronze plaque, a bracketed cornice, and a pierced balustrade. At each of the four corners is a round four-stage turret with windows and a dome. The flanking screen walls each has three strapwork gables, and at the end is a pavilion with a round-headed niche in a blank panel, and a strapwork gable with a pediment. Outside there are sets of cast iron bollards linked to each other by spiked chains, and to the lodge walls by lion heads' bosses.	II*
Water pump and railings 52.94753°N 1.18500°W		c. 1823	The water pump near Lenton Lodge stands on a stone base about 2 metres (6 ft 7 in) square. It is in cast iron, and has a fluted stem, a spout, an acorn finial, and a wrought iron handle. The pump is enclosed by a spiked cast iron railing and gate on a stone plinth.	II
2A and 4 Gregory Street; 52.94801°N 1.18039°W	—	Early 19th century	A pair of stuccoed houses on a plinth, with stone dressings and a tile roof, in Gothick style. There are two storeys, a U-shaped plan, and fronts of two and three bays. Most of the windows are flat-headed casements with moulded surrounds and hood moulds.	II
Trafalgar House; 52.94618°N 1.17894°W	—	Early 19th century	The house is stuccoed, on a plinth, with stone dressings, deep eaves and a hipped slate roof. There are two storeys and an L-shaped plan, with a main range of three bays. Most of the windows are casements with chamfered surrounds and pointed arched Gothick lights, and on the garden front is a two-storey bow window. At the rear is a verandah on cast iron columns with a tent roof.	II
Vine Cottage; 52.94691°N 1.17991°W	—	Early 19th century	A brick house, stuccoed on the front, on a plinth, with hipped slate roofs, in Gothick style. There are two storeys and an L-shaped plan, with a main range of three bays, and a rear wing. In the centre is a square porch with a hipped roof, and a doorway with pointed arches. Most of the windows are casements with pointed arches and moulded surrounds.	II
Sarcophagus; 52.94324°N 1.17952°W		c. 1828	The sarcophagus in the churchyard of the Priory Church of St Anthony, Lenton is the tomb of William Stretton and his family. It is in stone and has a moulded base, rebated corners, reeded edging, and a moulded top. The sarcophagus stands on a square platform.	II
Wright Family Vault; 52.94317°N 1.17965°W		1828	The vault for members of the Wright family is in the churchyard of the Priory Church of St Anthony, Lenton. It has a rectangular stone slab with a sloped top, and an inscribed slate tablet to the north. The vault is enclosed by a cast iron spearhead railing, and posts with urn finials, on which are dated cast iron plaques.	II
School House; 52.94866°N 1.17633°W		1841	The former schoolmaster's house was designed by H. I. Stevens in Tudor Revival style. It is in red brick on a plinth, with stone dressings, moulded eaves, and a patterned tile roof with coped gables and kneelers. There are two storeys and an L-shaped plan, with two bays, the right bay projecting and gabled. In the angle is a porch with a coped gable and finial, and a doorway with a double chamfered surround. The windows are casements with stone surrounds and mullions.	II
Sikh Temple; 52.94877°N 1.17605°W		1841	A school designed by H. I. Stevens in Tudor Revival style, later a Sikh temple. It is in red brick on a plinth, with painted stone dressings, moulded eaves, and a patterned tile roof with coped gables, kneelers and finials. It is in one and two storeys, and has a cruciform plan with a main range of eight bays. In the centre is a two-storey projection containing a gabled porch and a doorway with a pointed arch flanked by windows, above which is an elaborate datestone. Most of the windows are casements with mullions and transoms.	II
Railings and Gates at School and School House; 52.94861°N 1.17610°W		1841	The spearhead railings are in cast iron on a brick plinth with stone coping, and they extend for about 100 metres (330 ft). The gates and the gate posts, which are round with finials, are also in cast iron.	II
Holy Trinity Church, Lenton; 52.94837°N 1.17614°W		1841–42	The church was designed by H. I. Stevens in Gothic Revival style. It is built in stone with roofs of slate and tile, and consists of a nave with a clerestory, north and south aisles, a north porch, a chancel, a vestry and a west tower. The tower has three stages, angle buttresses, and a coped parapet with corner pinnacles. On the west side is a doorway with a gabled chamfered surround, and above are windows, clock faces, and three-light bell openings. Inside the church is a 12th-century cubical font originally in Lenton Priory.	II*
Churchyard railings and gates Holy Trinity Church, Lenton; 52.94849°N 1.17640°W		1842	The railings enclosing the churchyard are in cast iron, on a brick plinth with chamfered stone coping. They have round posts and are spiked, and extend for about 120 metres (390 ft). Outside the north porch is a pair of gates with round posts and finials, originally with lamps, and there is a similar pair to the southwest.	II
Former Lenton Vicarage; 52.94859°N 1.17524°W	—	1842	The vicarage, later divided into flats, is in red brick on a plinth, with stone dressings, and a tile roof with coped gables and kneelers. There are two storeys and attics, and fronts of three bays. On the south front is a projecting gabled wing with a canted bay window, and to its right is a doorway with a Tudor arch, a fanlight and a hood mould. Most of the windows are sashes with mullions, and there is a through-eaves dormer.	II
Wall and gate, Old Vicarage; 52.94867°N 1.17546°W	—	Mid 19th century	The boundary wall is in brick with stone dressings and gabled coping. It contains a pair of square gate piers with pyramidal caps and a wooden gate. At the left end is a rebuilt pier on a plinth.	II
Memorial; 52.94839°N 1.17641°W	—	1869	The memorial is in the churchyard of Holy Trinity Church, Lenton to the north of the tower, and is to members of the Shaw family, It is in stone, and consists of an interrupted octagonal spire, with four traceried gables, a traceried band, and a crocketed finial. The spire stands on a square pedestal on a stepped base, with lozenge-shaped inscribed tablets on each side.	II
Lenton War Memorial; 52.94643°N 1.17862°W		1919	The war memorial stands at a road junction in a small circular memorial garden. It was designed by Brewill and Baily, and consists of a square fluted Ionic column in Portland stone, with a moulded base and cornice, surmounted by a bronze cross with sunburst carving. The column is on a square pedestal on a cruciform base of two steps. On the sides of the pedestal are bronze plaques with inscriptions and the names of those lost in the First World War.	II*
Albert Ball Memorial Homes, walls, railings and gateways 52.94667°N 1.17817°W		1920–21	A group of houses built for families of local servicemen killed in action, in memory of the fighter pilot Albert Ball. They were designed by Brewill and Baily, and are in red brick on a plinth, with dressings in Portland stone, a floor band, a moulded eaves cornice and a hipped tile roof. There are two storeys and a curved plan. The central block has rusticated quoins, and is surmounted by a domed cupola with a sundial on the front and a finial in the form of a biplane. In the centre is a segmental portico with paired Tuscan columns, and a lead saucer-dome, and above it is an ornate inscribed cartouche. The windows are casements, and the doorways have hoods on moulded brackets. The boundary walls surround the gardens and the adjacent war memorial and are in red brick with stone dressings and coping, and have spiked wrought iron railing. The gate piers are rusticated with cornice caps, and the gates are in wrought iron.	II*
Bridge, pedestals and walls, Entrance to Boating Lake; 52.93545°N 1.19403°W		1922–26	The bridge carries a path over Tottle Brook at the entrance to the boating lake in Highfields Park. It is in stone, and consists of a single round arch with a keystone, and a low parapet wall with four pedestals. On each side of the bridge are curving stone walls with end piers, and flanking the path are seven square piers with plinths and flat caps. At the end of the path nearest the lake are screen walls parallel to the lakeside with five similar piers.	II
Gateway and pavilions at the entrance to the Boating Lake; 52.93517°N 1.19365°W		c. 1926	The gateway is flanked by square stone gate piers with plinths and cornices and surmounted by eagles, between them are wrought iron gates, and outside are coped screen walls, each with a wrought iron gate. Flanking these on each side is a pavilion with two storeys, and a curved front with six bays. The inside bays contain an oval window with a decorative surround and keystones, and elsewhere are mullioned windows.	II
Bust of Sir Jesse Boot; 52.93510°N 1.19357°W		1932	The bust at the entrance to the boating lake in Highfields Park depicts Jesse Boot, 1st Baron Trent. It is a life-size bust in bronze by Charles Doman, on a tapered square stone pedestal with a plinth and a cornice, on a square base.	II
St Mary's Church, Wollaton Park; 52.94696°N 1.18671°W		1937–39	The church was designed by T. Cecil Howitt, and is built in buff brick with moulded brick dressings, and a tile roof with coped gables and crosses. It has a plinth, a string course, a sill band and a corbel table. The church consists of single unit with seven bays, west porches and east vestries.	II
Boots D90 West Headquarters Building; 52.92718°N 1.18390°W		1966–68	An office building, it has a zinc-sprayed matt-black welded steel frame with deep steel lattice trusses. There is a first floor reinforced concrete slab supported on columns, and a flat roof, two storeys, and a rectangular plan with an internal courtyard. The building has a projecting cornice, four cruciform-beam columns, a sill band of white marble, and the glazing is set between mullions.	II*
