= Lenton Flats =

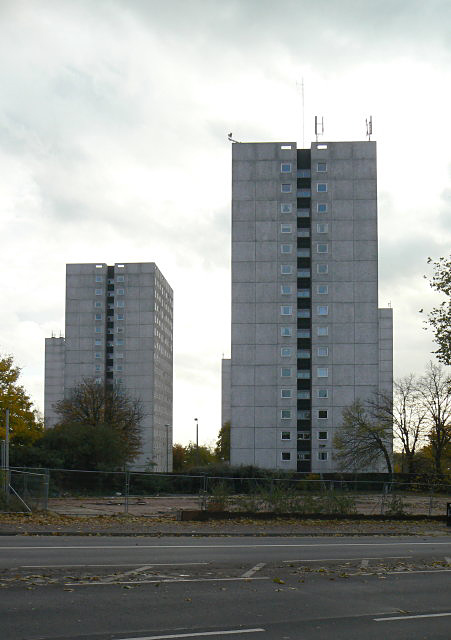
- The Lenton Flats in November 2008. All demolished by 2016.
- Interactive map of the Lenton Flats area

General information
- Status: All demolished (Between November 2013–May 2016)
- Type: Residential
- Architectural style: Brutalist / Modernist
- Location: Lenton, Nottingham, England
- Coordinates: 52°57′01″N 1°10′21″W
- Completed: 1967

Height
- Roof: 48.1 metres (158 ft)
- Top floor: 16

Technical details
- Floor count: 17 (All Blocks)

The Lenton Flats were a mid-20th century high rise housing complex located in the Lenton area, west of the city of Nottingham, England. The estate originally consisted of 5 tower blocks, with each block reaching to a height of 48.1 metres (158 ft) and consisting of 17 floors. All tower blocks were demolished by May 2016.

== History ==
Construction of the complex began in the 1960s and all tower blocks were completed in 1967. Like many housing complexes in Nottingham, they were built following slum clearances in the area. However the tower blocks faced many problems, including bad insulation, unaffordable heating costs and other technical failures.

== Demolition ==
In 2011, it was announced by Nottingham City Council of plans to demolish the Lenton Flats due to being increasingly expensive to maintain for the blocks to have improved living standards. Demolition of the complex started in 2013, with Lenton Court being the first to be demolished in November. Following the demolition of Digby and Abbey Court in 2014, the construction process of modern Low-rise houses and flats began as part of a construction of a new housing estate. Willoughby Court was then demolished by June 2015, followed by Newgate Court in May 2016. The construction of the new low-rise housing estate was complete by 2018.
