= Severus William Lynam Stretton =

British Army officer (1793–1884)

Severus Stretton
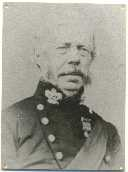
- Severus Stretton's portrait at the Durham Light Infantry Museum
- Born: 14 May 1793; Nottingham, England
- Died: November 22, 1884 (aged 91); Southampton, England
- Relatives: William Stretton (father); Sempronius Stretton (brother)
- Military career
- Allegiance: British Empire
- Branch: Army
- Rank: Lieutenant colonel
- Units: 68th (Durham) Regiment of Foot (Light Infantry); 64th (2nd Staffordshire) Regiment of Foot; 40th (the 2nd Somersetshire) Regiment of Foot
- Conflicts: Napoleonic Wars; Battle of Vitoria

Severus William Lynam Stretton (14 May 1793 – 22 November 1884) was a British Army officer who served in the Napoleonic Wars.

== Early and personal life ==
Stretton was born on 14 May 1793, the youngest child of William Stretton. He was baptised at St Mary's Church, Nottingham, on 29 May 1793. His name of Severus followed his parents habit of naming their children with unusual names that begin with "S". He was their second child called Severus as an earlier child had died young ten years before.

On 24 October 1851, Stretton married the Catherine Adela de Courcy (1831–?), youngest daughter of John Stapleton de Courcy, 28th Baron Kingsale. There were seven daughters and one son from the marriage:

- Sarah A. C. Stretton, born 1855.
- Florence C. Stretton, 1857.
- Catherine M. Stretton, 1859.
- Frances A. Stretton, 1861.
- William de Courcy Stretton, 1862, who became a lieutenant in the Royal Artillery, and
- wrote the words to the song Follow the Colours set to music by Sir Edward Elgar.
- Susanna E. Stretton, 1864.
- Amy Stretton. 1867.
- Gertrude Stretton, 1862.

He died at Southampton on 22 November 1884.

== Career ==
Stretton obtained a commission in the Nottinghamshire Militia in Plymouth in 1810, and accompanied the regiment to Ireland. In 1812, he obtained an ensigncy in the 68th (Durham) Regiment of Foot (Light Infantry), and joined the regiment in Portugal, serving in the second Peninsular campaign of 1812–13.

Having been severely wounded at the Battle of Vitoria on 21 June 1813, by two musket balls which lodged in his body. He was removed, in a very precarious state, to England. (Prior to this, one of the balls was extracted, but the other, at different periods, was a source of great trouble and pain, relieved only by severe surgical operations until it was successfully extracted in 1870.) The medical treatment he received at his father's house at Lenton Priory restored him so far that after twelve months he was enabled to rejoin his regiment stationed in Ireland.

He accompanied the same regiment to Canada in 1818, and in 1825 was promoted to an unattached company, shortly after which he exchanged to the 64th (2nd Staffordshire) Regiment of Foot, and joined it at Gibraltar. He was promoted major in 1832. He succeeded to the lieutenant-colonelcy and command of this regiment in 1842, having accompanied it to the West Indies and Nova Scotia, from whence he returned with it in 1843. He had, in the meantime, inherited the Lenton property from his brother Sempronius Stretton but never resided there.

In 1848, Stretton exchanged to his brother's old regiment, the 40th (the 2nd Somersetshire) Regiment of Foot, of which he retained the command until June, 1852. He was awarded the Military General Service Medal and was also in receipt of a pension for wounds.

He retired in 1852 from active service, but three years later was appointed to the command of the Hampshire Militia, which he held until 1868, when he retired at the age of 75.

In 1862, Colonel Stretton was appointed a Justice of the Peace for the Borough of Southampton, and he took an active part in the management of the Royal South Hampshire Infirmary, Southampton Dispensary and other charitable institutions in the town.

His medals are held in Medal Case 27, Display Group 24 in the Durham Museum and Art Gallery.
