= William Woodsend Memorial Homes =

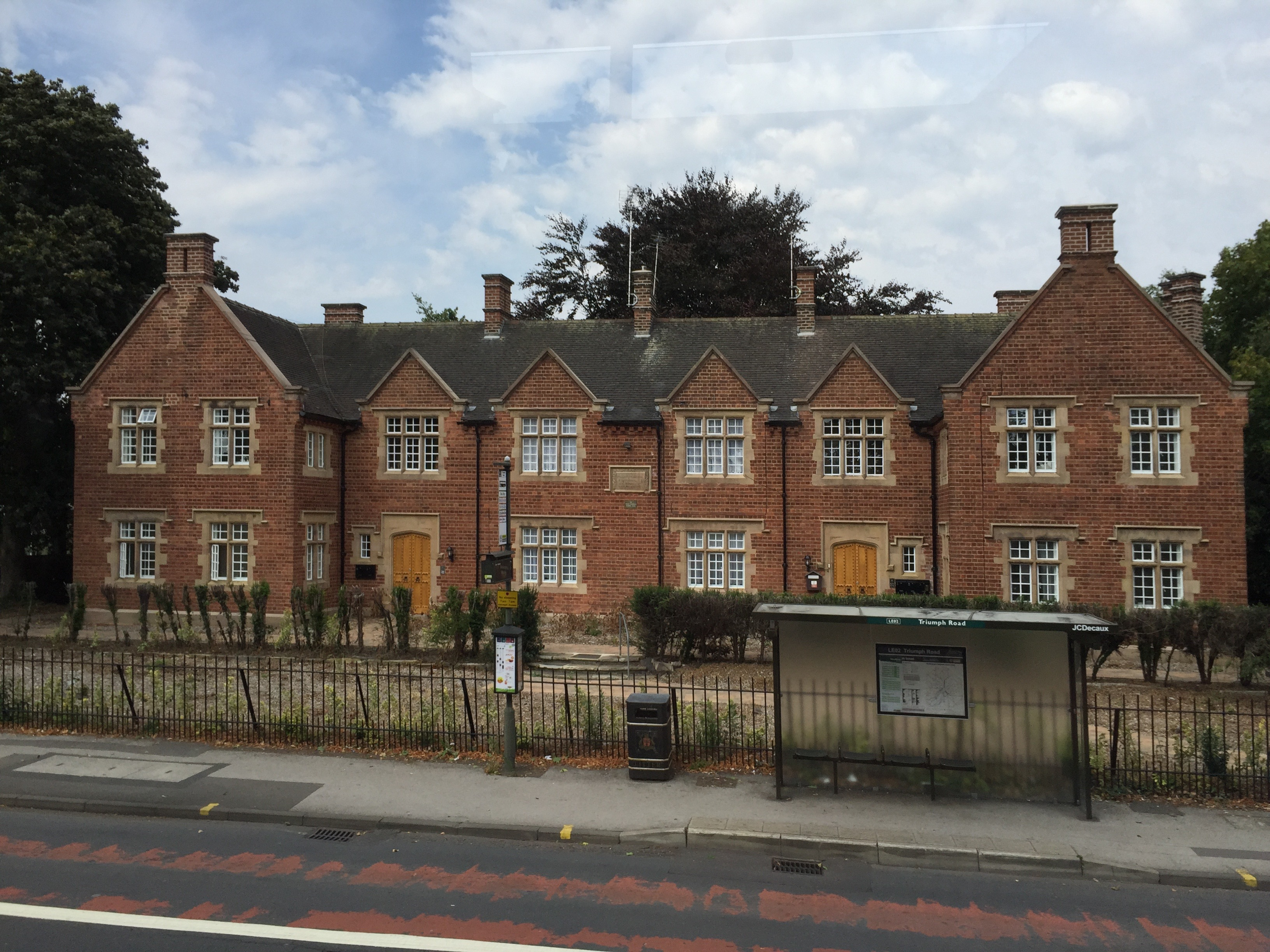
- The William Woodsend Memorial Homes on Derby Road in Nottingham

- Location within Nottinghamshire
- 52.947907°N 1.182854°W
- Location: Lenton, Nottinghamshire, England

History
- Built: 1912-13
- Built for: Jack Woodsend and Arthur Woodsend

The William Woodsend Memorial Homes were erected in 1912–13 on Derby Road in Lenton, Nottingham.

They were built as six almshouses in memory of local builder William Woodsend by his sons, Jack and Arthur. These almshouses have several conditions of tenancy including preference to be given to persons who, through no fault of their own, have become reduced in circumstances. Or, to women previously employed as governesses, nurses or school mistresses who have not been able to make provision for their old age.

The William Woodsend Memorial Homes charity looked after the property and its residents from 1913 until 2007.

When the charity managing the homes ran out of money in 2007, the homes were taken over by the Nottingham Community Housing Association.
