= Castle Gate, Nottingham =

Street in Nottingham, England

Castle Gate
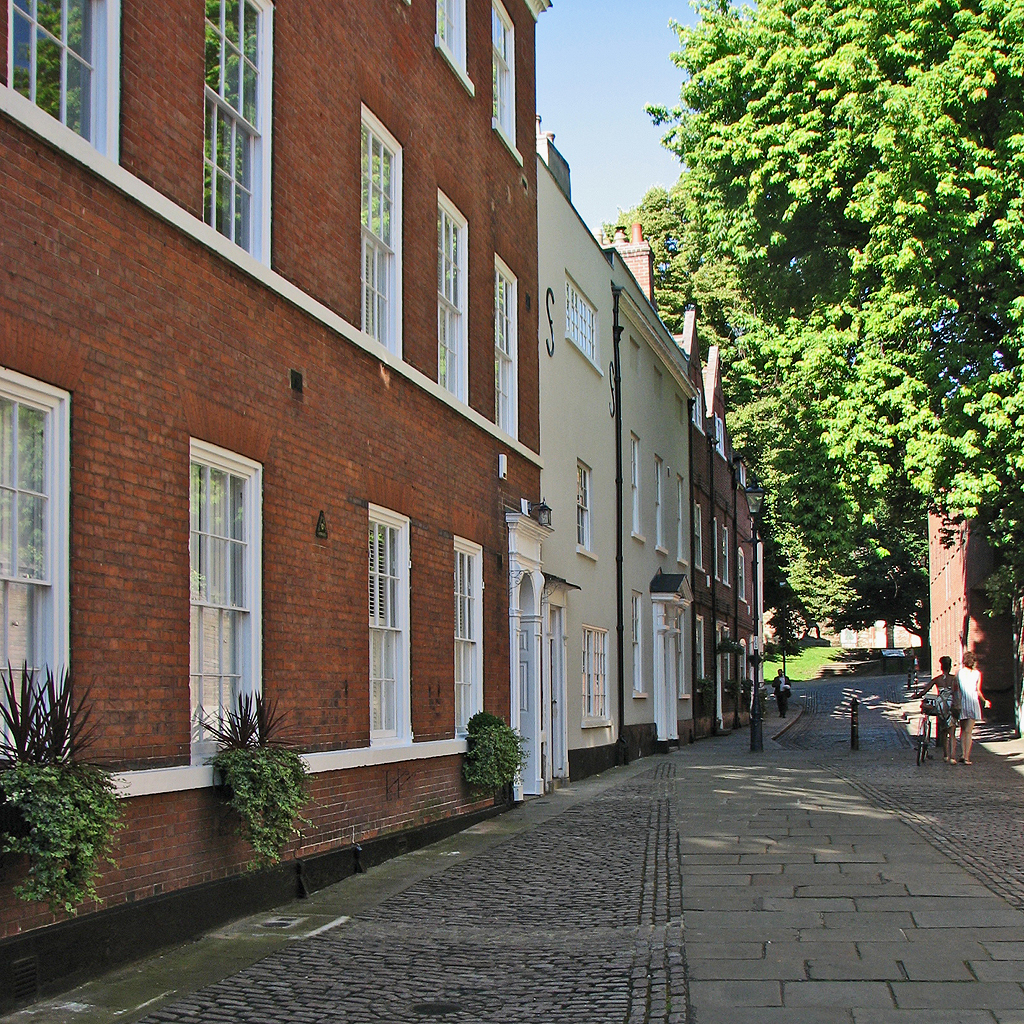
- Castle Gate towards the top

- Location within Nottingham
- Maintained by: Nottingham City Council
- Coordinates: 52°57′3.77″N 1°9′3.24″W

Castle Gate is an historic street near the centre of the English city of Nottingham. The street runs uphill, from a junction with Low Pavement, Lister Gate and Albert Street in the city centre, to Castle Road, near to the entrance to Nottingham Castle. The street is noted for its Georgian houses, many of which are listed buildings. There is also a complex of rock-cut caves, under buildings at the lower end of the street, which is a scheduled monument.

The street is bisected roughly half-way up by Maid Marian Way and the two halves have rather different natures. Below Maid Marian Way the street is wider and most of the imposing buildings date from the 18th century of later, whilst in the higher part the streetscape is smaller scale with earlier buildings. Perhaps reflecting this, the lower part of the street is in the city's Old Market Square conservation area, whilst the upper part is in the Castle conservation area.

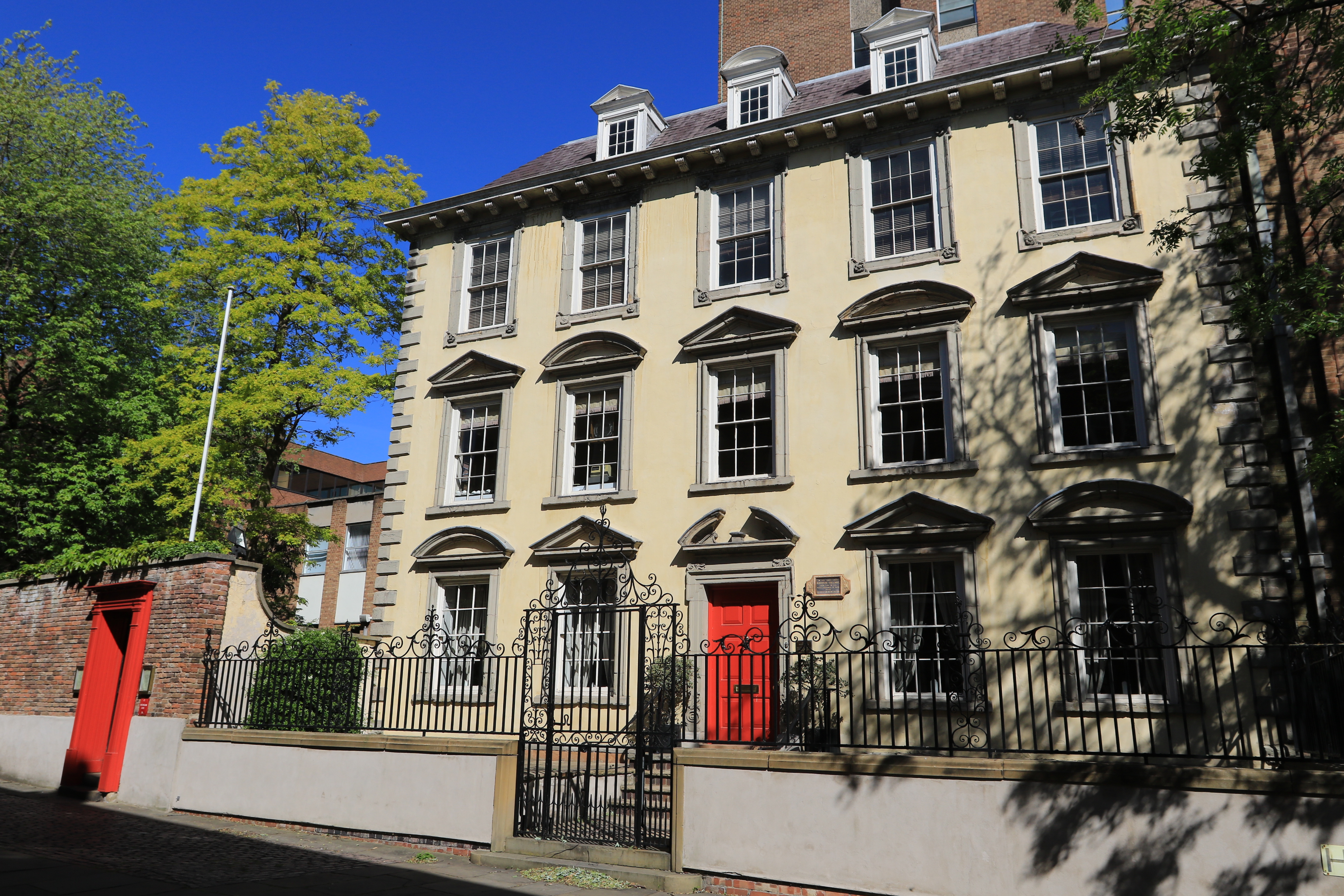
Newdigate House

== History ==
The rock-cut caves discovered during the construction 8 Castle Gate, at the lower end of the street, contain potsherds dating to around 1250, which is the earliest secure date for activity associated with the various caves around Nottingham. Excavation has shown that the caves were used as maltings and probably extend under adjacent buildings.

The street itself is first mentioned in 1315, and an early name for the street was Frenchgate, or Franchegate (Latin: Vicus Franciscus). This suggests that it was constructed soon after the Norman Conquest for the French followers of William Peverel, the first Sheriff of Nottinghamshire. As well as a route to the castle, it is likely it was the original access to St Nicholas Church, founded in the 11th or 12th century, a role it fulfilled until the construction of Maid Marian Way.

The first Nonconformist chapel to be built in Nottingham opened at the lower end of Castle Gate in 1689, on the site now occupied by the 19th century Castle Gate Congregational Chapel. During the 18th century the street became popular with the merchant classes of the city, many of whom built their homes and warehouses in the street. The homes on the south of the street would then have had views over open country towards the Trent and beyond. Paving works were undertaken in 1752 at a cost of £60 (equivalent to £11,281 in 2025).

The street was bisected in 1958 by the construction of Maid Marian Way, resulting in the loss of several fine properties, including number 35, St Nicholas Rectory of 1886 by Watson Fothergill and number 37 which was St Nicholas’ Parish Rooms. In the late 20th century, many of the former houses and warehouses were converted to office use, but more recently several buildings have been turned into student accommodation.

== Notable buildings and sites ==
=== Below Maid Marian Way, south side ===
- 1, a shop currently occupied by Weavers wine merchants.
- 3, the site of Haywood's Factory where D.H. Lawrence worked in 1901.
- 11, the site of the Black Lion Inn.
- 15, a former warehouse and bakery built in 1897 by William Dymock Pratt.
- 17, a grade II listed mid-18th century town house.
- 19, the grade II* listed Stanford House dating from ca. 1776.

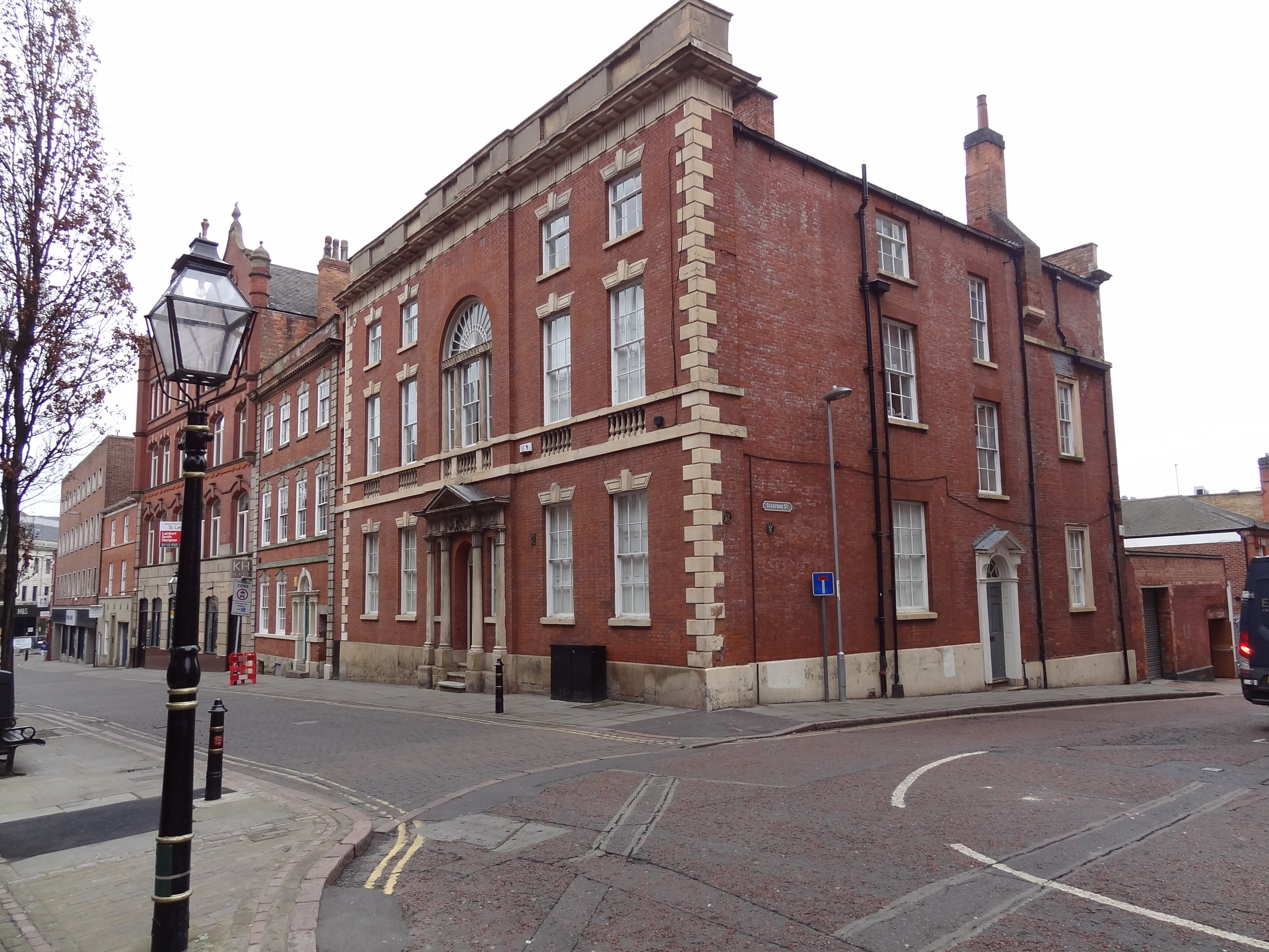
Number 19 Castle Gate

- 27, St Nicholas Court, built in 1900 by H.E. Woodsend
- 29 and 31, a pair of grade II listed town houses built in 1794 and which formed the Nottingham Castle Gate Hospital between 1875 and 1930.
- 33, the grade II listed mid-18th century former Lyceum House

=== Below Maid Marian Way, north side ===
- 4, the grade II listed Castle Gate Congregational Chapel dating from 1863.
- 6, the grade II listed Cleaves Hall dating from 1883. Designed by Parry and Walker as Castle Gate Schools for the Congregational Chapel.
- 8, a 1960s-built office block above a mediaeval rock-cut cave complex that is a scheduled monument.
- 10, 12 and 12a, grade II listed late 18th century town houses and attached lace factory
- 24 to 30, Castlegate House, formerly a Ministry of Transport Office
- 32, the grade II listed early 18th century Castlegate Chambers
- 34 and 36, a grade II listed pair of early 18th century town housex
- 50a, the Royal Children public house, built in 1933-34 by Albert Edgar Eberlin

=== Above Maid Marian Way, south side ===
- 43, 45 and 47, grade II listed houses built in 1788 by William Stretton. It was the city architects' office from 1960s to 1974, then the Costume Museum until 2004.
- 49, a grade II listed late 17th century house
- 51, a grade II listed late 17th century house
- 53, a grade II listed mid 17th century house
- 55, a grade II listed late 17th century house
- 57 and 59, a pair of grade II listed houses from the mid 18th century, adjoining the 15th century Severn's Building (on Castle Road)

=== Above Maid Marian Way, north side ===
- 64, the 17th century Newdigate House, where Camille d'Hostun, duc de Tallard was kept prisoner after defeat in the Battle of Blenheim
