= Savoy Cinema, Nottingham =

Cinema in Nottingham, England

Savoy Cinema Nottingham
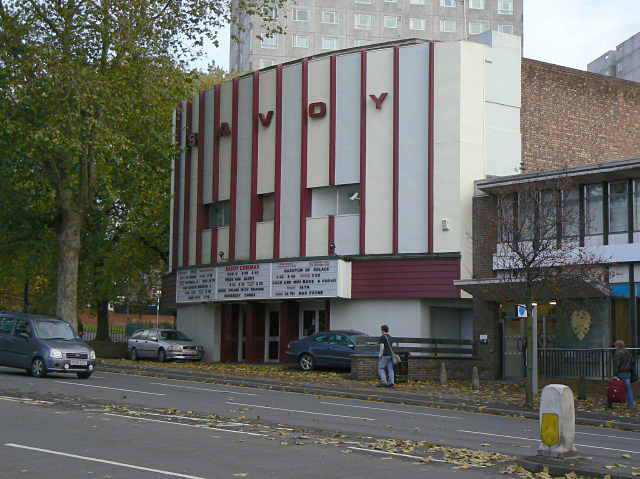
- Savoy Cinema on Derby Road Nottingham
- Interactive map of the Savoy Cinema Nottingham area
- Alternative names: Savoy Cinema

General information
- Status: Operating
- Type: Cinema
- Location: Lenton, Nottingham, Nottinghamshire
- Coordinates: 52°57′4.88″N 1°10′25.53″W
- Current tenants: Savoy Cinemas
- Construction started: 1930s
- Completed: 1935
- Opened: 7 November 1935
- Owner: Savoy Cinemas

Design and construction
- Architect: Reginald William Gaze Cooper

Other information
- Parking: no
- Public transit: Nottingham City Transport

Website
- www.savoycinemas.co.uk

Savoy Cinema is on Derby Road in Nottingham, England. It is the only surviving pre-Second World War cinema in Nottingham.

== History ==
Savoy Cinema was built in 1935 to designs by the architect Reginald Cooper. It is built in the art-deco style with a curved front. It is owned by Savoy Cinemas.

It was opened on 7 November 1935 by Lenton Picture House Ltd, a consortium of local businessmen. It had seating for 1,242. The first film was Flirtation Walk with Dick Powell.

The interior of the Savoy Cinema was itself used as a setting for part of the famous 1960 film by Alan Sillitoe, Saturday Night and Sunday Morning.

In 1972 the single auditorium was rebuilt to offer three screens.
