= Newdigate House =

Listed building in Nottingham, England

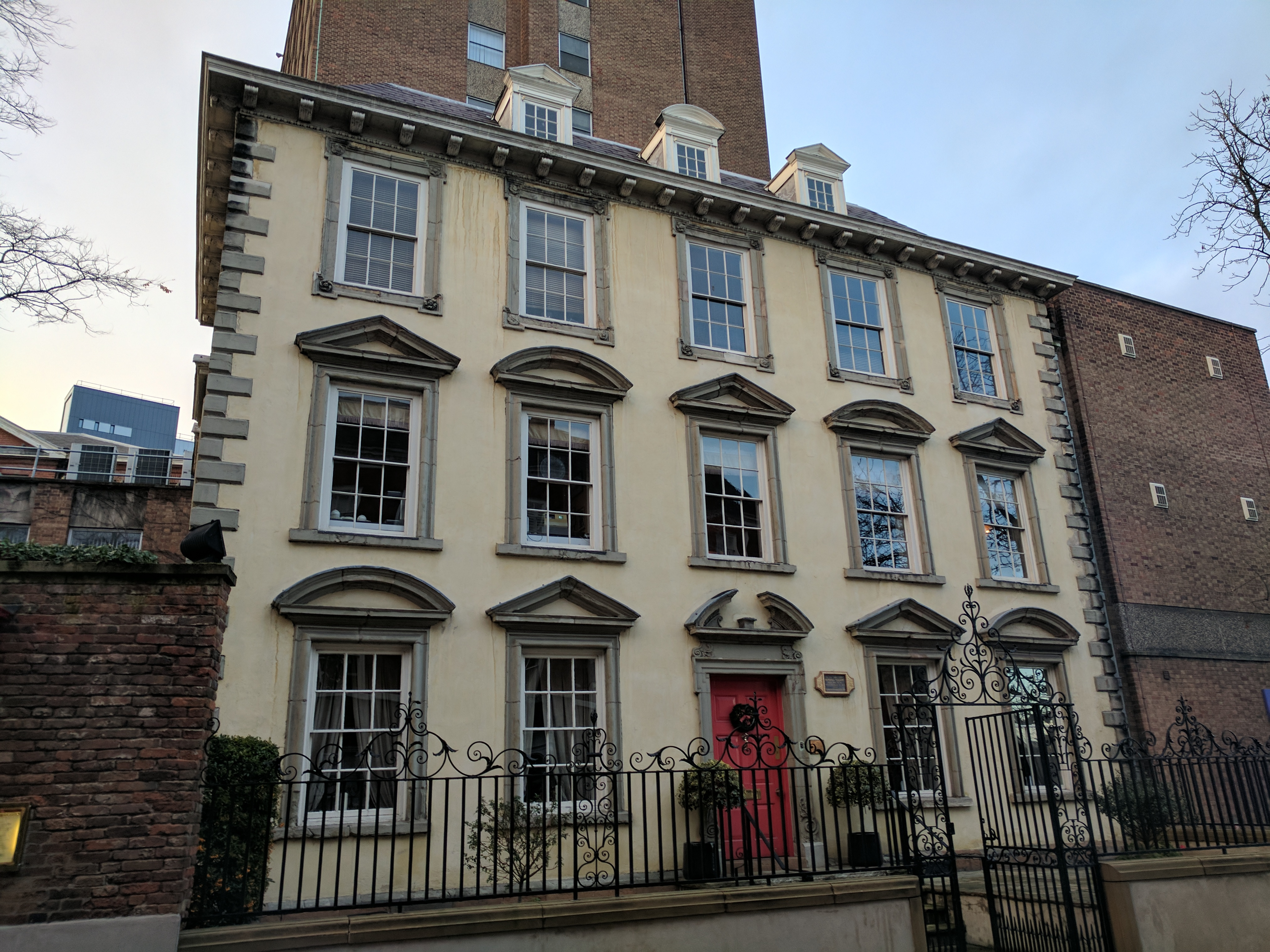

- Location in Nottingham

General information
- Location: Castle Gate, Nottingham, England
- Coordinates: 52°57′3.69″N 1°09′8.15″W
- Completed: c. 1675

Listed Building – Grade II*
- Official name: Newdigate House and attached railings and boundary wall
- Designated: 11 August 1952
- Reference no.: 1271185

Newdigate House is a Grade II* listed building on Castle Gate, Nottingham, England.

The house was built for Thomas Charlton the younger, of Chilwell. He sold it in 1683 to Samuel Staples of Nottingham who leased it to Camille d'Hostun, duc de Tallard, who was effectively kept prisoner in it from 1705 to 1711 after defeat in the Battle of Blenheim in 1704.

In 1716 the house was sold to Thomas Newdigate, the sixth son of Sir Richard Newdigate, 1st Baronet, of Arbury Hall, Warwickshire. He commissioned Francis Foulgham to make the wrought-iron screen and gates which survive at the front of the house, enclosing the court yard. It was lived in by subsequent members of the Newdigate family until 1790 when it was sold to Mrs Thomas Wright. She arranged for William Stretton to make some changes. The house was sold again in 1817.

In 1905 the building was being used by W. Lee, an antiques dealer, and was put up for sale.

In 1915 the house was used by the Domestic Workers' Sub-Committee of the War Relief Fund as an office.

In 1960 the house became the United Services Club, and the ground floor was used by World Service restaurant from 2000 until its closure in 2024.

== See also ==
- Grade II* listed buildings in Nottinghamshire
- Listed buildings in Nottingham (Radford and Park ward)
