= Priory Church of St Anthony, Lenton =

Church in Lenton, England

Coordinates: 52°56′37″N 01°10′43″W

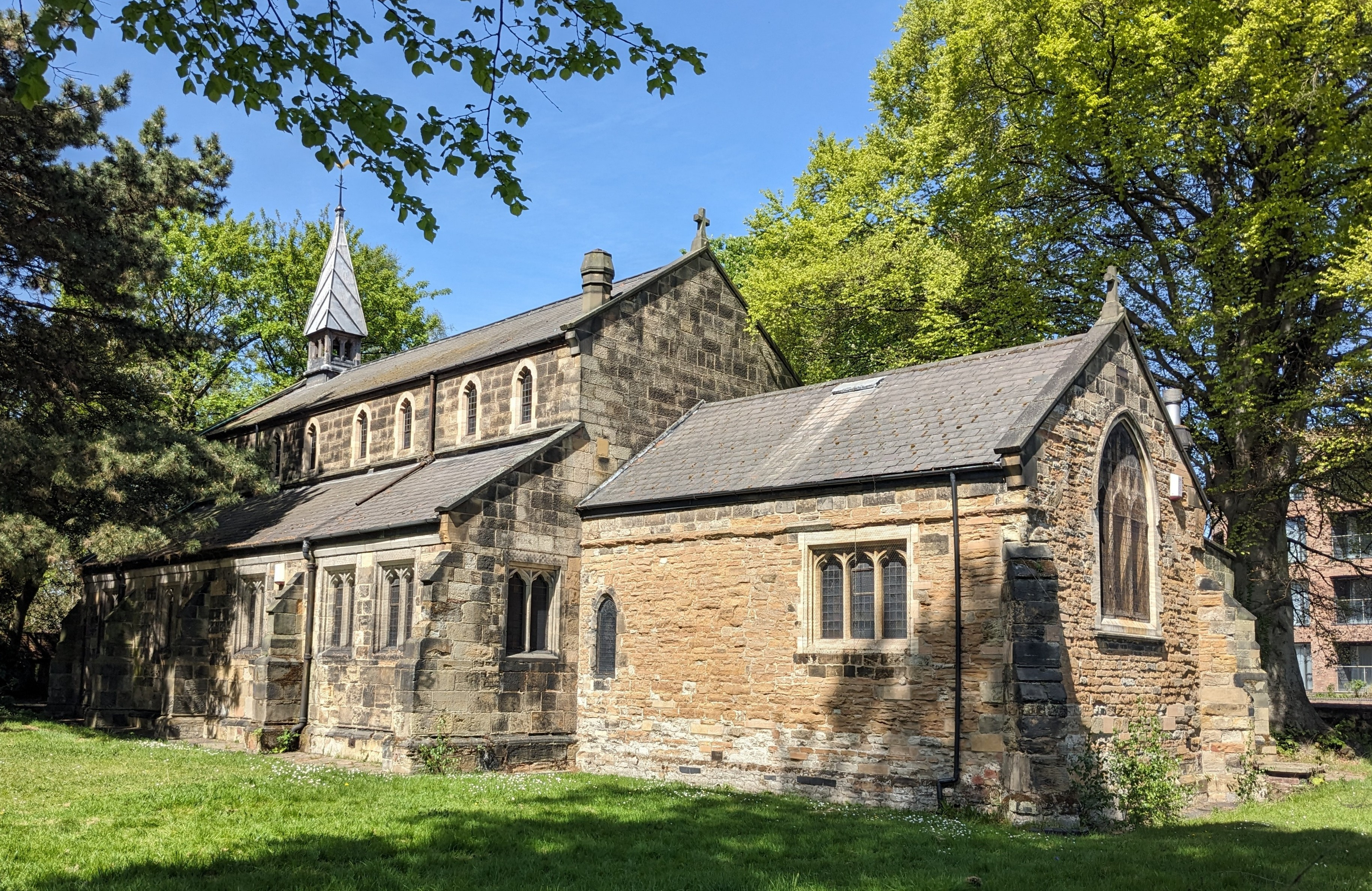
- Priory Church of St Anthony, Lenton
- Denomination: Church of England
- Churchmanship: Broad Church
- Website: www.lentonparish.org.uk

History
- Dedication: St. Anthony

Administration
- Province: York
- Diocese: Southwell and Nottingham
- Parish: Lenton, Nottingham

Clergy
- Vicar: Revd Garreth Frank

The Priory Church of St Anthony, Lenton, also known as The Priory, is a parish church in the Church of England in Lenton, Nottingham.

== History ==
Elements of the church, in particular the chancel walls, are thought to date back to the 12th century chapel of the Hospital of St Anthony, which formed part of Lenton Priory.

This church, originally dedicated to the Holy Trinity, served as the parish church for Lenton, until it was deemed inadequate to the needs of the parish, leading to the building of a new church between Old and New Lenton in 1842, to which was transferred the dedication of Holy Trinity Church. The church standing on the current site of The Priory was subsequently left in a partly-demolished state for 40 years.

The restoration of the church began in 1883 and on 22 November a memorial stone was laid by the Lady of the Manor, Mrs. J. Sherwin Gregory, consecrated by Christopher, Bishop of Lincoln, being dedicated the following year to the Church of St. Anthony, commonly known as the Priory Church. The work was carried out by Evans and Jolley and it was re-opened on 4 December 1884

The Priory now forms part of the benefice of Lenton, alongside Holy Trinity Church, Lenton.

== Organ ==
The church has a pipe organ by Ernest Wragg and Son, installed in 1924.

== See also ==
- Listed buildings in Nottingham (Dunkirk and Lenton ward)
