= Colwick Hall =

Listed building in Nottinghamshire, England

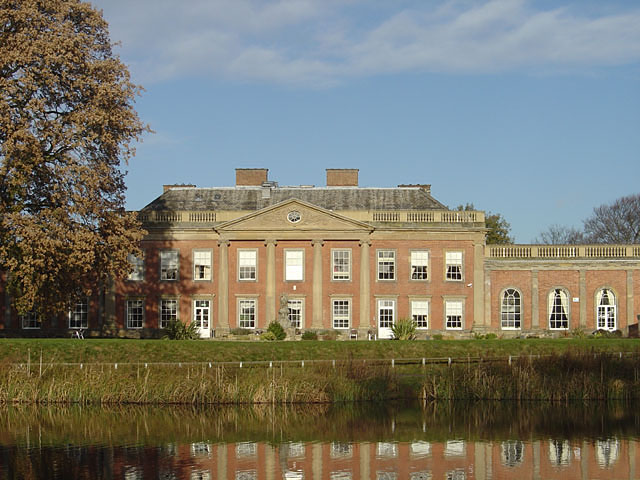

- Location within Nottinghamshire

General information
- Type: English country house
- Location: Colwick, Nottingham, England
- Coordinates: 52.945203°N 1.106014°W
- Current tenants: Pearl Hotels and Restaurants
- Year built: Early 18th century
- Renovated: 1776 (remodelled)
- Client: John Musters

Design and construction
- Architect: John Carr
- Civil engineer: Samuel Stretton

Website
- colwickhallhotel.com

Listed Building – Grade II*
- Official name: Colwick Hall
- Designated: 11 August 1952
- Reference no.: 1254981

Colwick Hall was an English country house in Colwick, Nottinghamshire, England. It is now an hotel. The building is Grade II* listed.

Colwick Hall is constructed of red brick, with ashlar dressings and hipped slate roofs with a 2-storey central block and single-storey wings. The frontage has four Ionic pillars surmounted by a pediment.

== History ==
The earliest references to the estate occur on the death of William de Colwick in 1362, when it passed by the marriage of his daughter Joan to Sir Richard Byron, into the Byron family. The Byrons lived here for over 150 years until about 1660, when they moved to Newstead Abbey and Colwick Hall came into the ownership of the Musters family.

John Musters replaced all of the older buildings with the present hall in 1775–1776. The new house was built by local builder, Samuel Stretton, from designs of John Carr of York. It was enclosed with a moat, crossed by drawbridge on the north side.

In 1805 John Musters's son Jack married Mary Chaworth, Byron's childhood love-interest from Annesley Hall. In 1827 Jack inherited Colwick Hall from his father, but in 1831, during the Second Reform Bill disturbances, it was sacked and partly burned by rioters. Mary Chaworth Musters spent the night in pouring rain with her daughter Sophia, crouched beneath the shrubbery and died at Wiverton Hall some four months later from the shock.

Jack and Mary's eldest son, John George Chaworth Musters (1807–1842), predeceased his father. He had married Emily Hamond, the youngest daughter of Philip Hamond of Westacre, Norfolk. Both of them died of tuberculosis, leaving three orphaned children. The eldest son, John Chaworth Musters (1838–1887), inherited the estates from his grandfather Jack in 1847. He in turn was succeeded in 1887 by his son John Patricius Musters (1860–1921), who in 1888 obtained licence to add the surname Chaworth to his own.

In 1896 the hall was sold to the Nottingham Racecourse Company - the racecourse opened in 1892, the hall became a public house and the rest of the buildings were used to accommodate grooms and jockeys.

Nottingham Corporation acquired the hall from the Racecourse Company in 1965. The building then fell into disrepair until it was saved by Chek Whyte, who won a competition to restore it. It was then sold to Pearl Hotels and Restaurants.

== See also ==
- Grade II* listed buildings in Nottinghamshire
- Listed buildings in Nottingham (Dale ward)
