= Albert Ball Memorial Homes =

Historical building in Nottingham, England

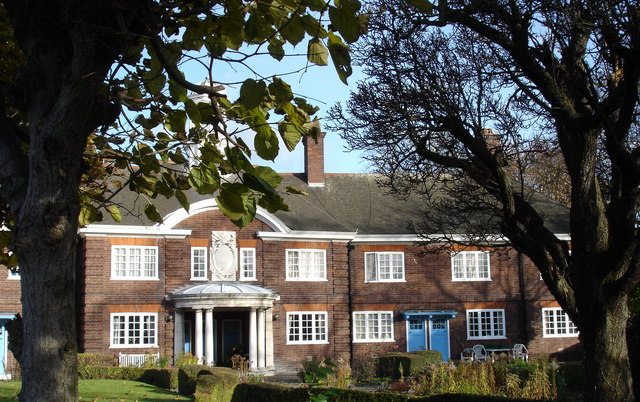
- Adams Building - principal entrance at night

- Location within Nottinghamshire

General information
- Architectural style: Renaissance Revival
- Location: Lenton, Nottingham, England
- Coordinates: 52°56′48″N 1°10′42″W
- Year built: 1922
- Client: Alderman Albert Ball

Listed Building – Grade II*
- Official name: The Albert Ball Memorial Homes, including boundary walls, railings and gateways
- Designated: 30 November 1995
- Reference no.: 1246781

Listed Building – Grade II*
- Official name: Lenton War Memorial, adjacent to The Albert Ball Memorial Homes
- Designated: 30 November 1995
- Reference no.: 1246782

The Albert Ball Memorial Homes were erected in 1922 in Lenton, Nottingham, England.

Alderman Albert Ball commissioned the building of the Albert Ball Memorial Homes in Lenton to house the families of local servicemen killed in action, in memory of his son, Albert Ball, a fighter pilot who had been killed in World War I.

Opened on 7 September 1922, the homes featured some unusual design elements. The building, containing eight residences, was created to evoke an aircraft, with the homes the wings, and the central porch reminiscent of a cockpit. The two centre homes had curving doors, windows, and walls that also fit the theme. Windows on the row are suggestive of propellers. They were also built with ease of use for the elderly in mind. The Albert Ball Memorial Homes were Grade II* listed in 1995.

== War memorial ==
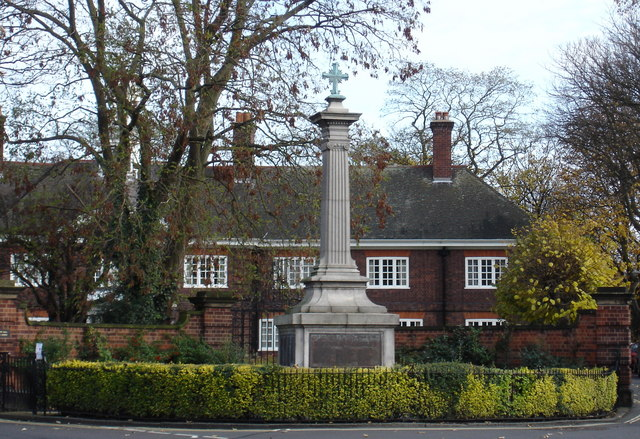
War memorial in front of the memorial homes

The Lenton War Memorial, located in front of the homes, includes Ball's name and was also paid for by the Ball family. It is also Grade II* listed.

== See also ==
- Grade II* listed buildings in Nottinghamshire
- Listed buildings in Nottingham (Dunkirk and Lenton ward)
