= Sempronius Stretton =

British Army officer (1781–1842)

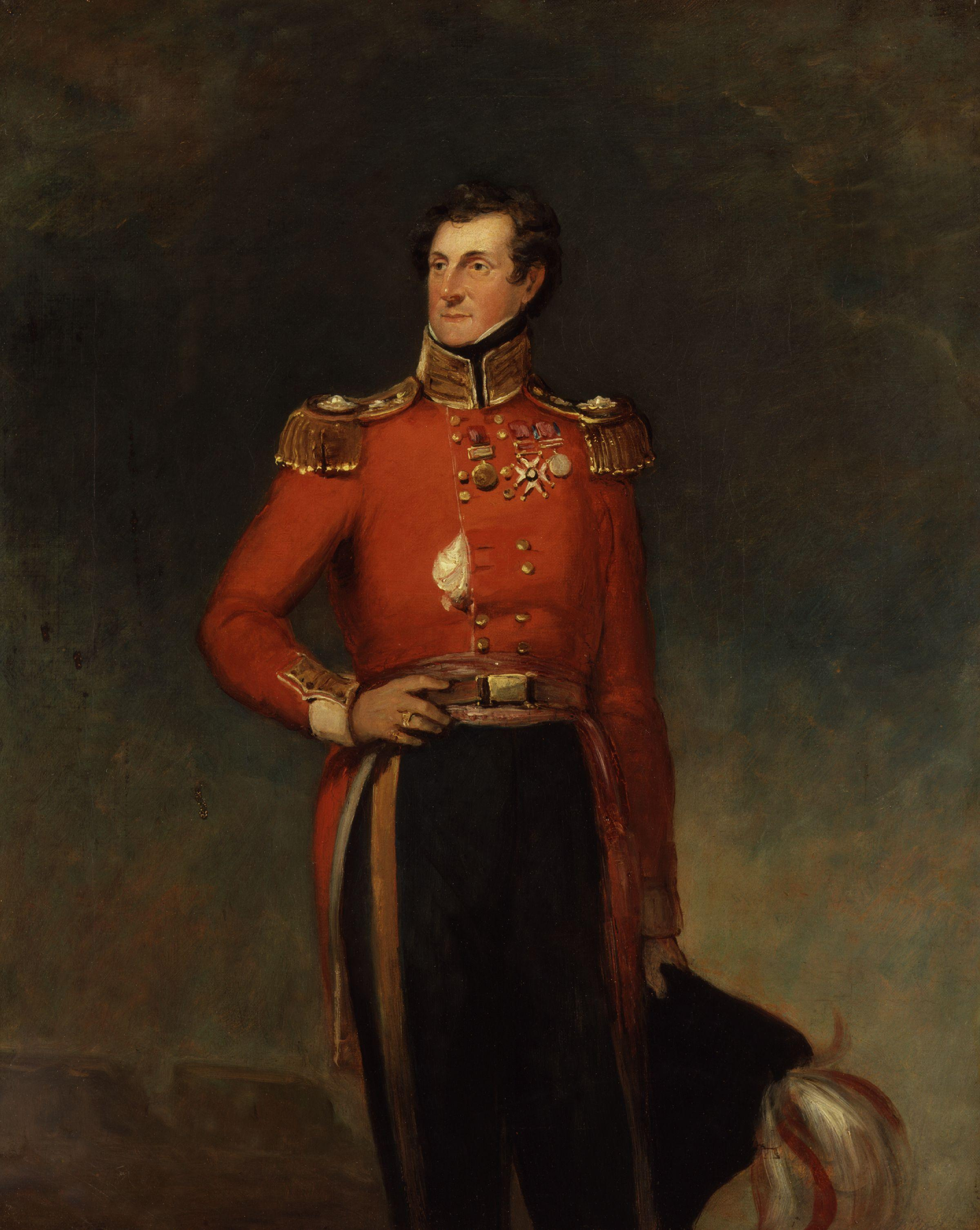
- Sempronius Stretton's portrait by William Salter (a study for his painting of the Duke of Wellington's banquet)
- Born: 15 May 1781; Nottingham, England
- Died: 6 March 1842 (aged 60); Croydon, England
- Relatives: William Stretton (father); Severus William Lynam Stretton (brother)
- Military career
- Allegiance: British Empire
- Rank: Colonel
- Units: 40th (the 2nd Somersetshire) Regiment of Foot; 68th (Durham) Regiment of Foot (Light Infantry)
- Other work: Painting

Sempronius Stretton CB (15 May 1781 – 6 March 1842) was a British Army officer who served in numerous campaigns including the Battle of Waterloo. He is also known for his sketches that recorded early Canadian life.

== Early life ==
Stretton was the eldest son of William Stretton, a builder and antiquarian. He was born in Nottingham on 15 May 1781, and baptised nine days later at St Mary's Church, Nottingham He was given an unusual name beginning with "s" which was a common feature of all his siblings.

== Artist and the military ==
He entered the army at an early age, commencing his military career in the Nottinghamshire Militia, which he joined at Dumfries, in April 1800. In the following November, he entered the 6th Regiment of Foot at Chatham as an ensign.

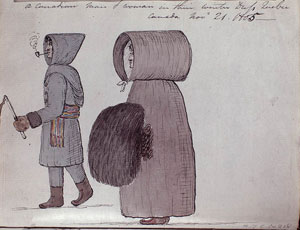
Canadian Man and Woman in their Winter Dress, Quebec, 1805, by Stretton

In April 1801, he was promoted to a lieutenancy in the 49th Regiment, and shortly afterwards sailed for Quebec. Whilst he was in Canada he used his artistic skills to sketch not only landscapes but also made a valuable record of the wildlife and the local dress. Stretton's 1804 sketch of "York Barracks, Lake Ontario, Upper Canada, 1804" is credited as being one of the earliest pictures of what was to become the city of Toronto. Lieutenant Stretton served under Colonel Isaac Brock, who selected him to act as his aide-de-camp.

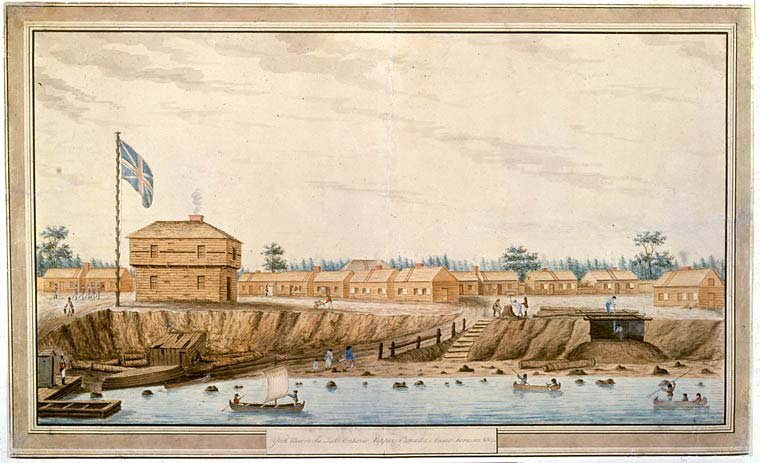
York Barracks in 1805 by Stretton (this would become the city of Toronto).

Later he was promoted to a company in the 40th Regiment. He returned to England and undertook duties in the recruiting service. Stretton ability as a draughtsman was acknowledged by his father and many of his sketches were included in his father's records.

== Military ==
In 1812, Captain Stretton sailed for Lisbon, where he met his brother, then an ensign in the 68th (Durham) Regiment of Foot (Light Infantry) and the two brothers proceeded to join the army under Lord Wellington. Captain Stretton's first engagement with the enemy was at the Battle of Vittoria, 21 June 1813. This battle ended the rule of Bonaparte's eldest brother and Stretton returned from the battle with Joseph Bonaparte's Forrage Cap Top which was kept in the regimental museum.

On 28 July 1813, Captain Stretton received the thanks of Lord Wellington, conveyed to him through William V, Prince of Orange, for the gallant defence made by the 40th, under his command, supported by two Portuguese regiments, in defending the position on the heights before Pamplona. For this he was awarded the Army Gold Medal, and received the brevet rank of major. His account of his leadership in defending the heights of Pamplona were included in the history of the regiment.

He was present in the numerous actions with the enemy which ended with the battle of Toulouse, 10 April 1814. When the army was withdrawn from France, he accompanied it to New Orleans in 1814, and nearly lost his life when shipwrecked in the Baring transport in Bantry Bay on 10 October 1814. From Cork, Major Stretton sailed in the Wellington transport, and arrived on the Mississippi River on 9 January 1815.

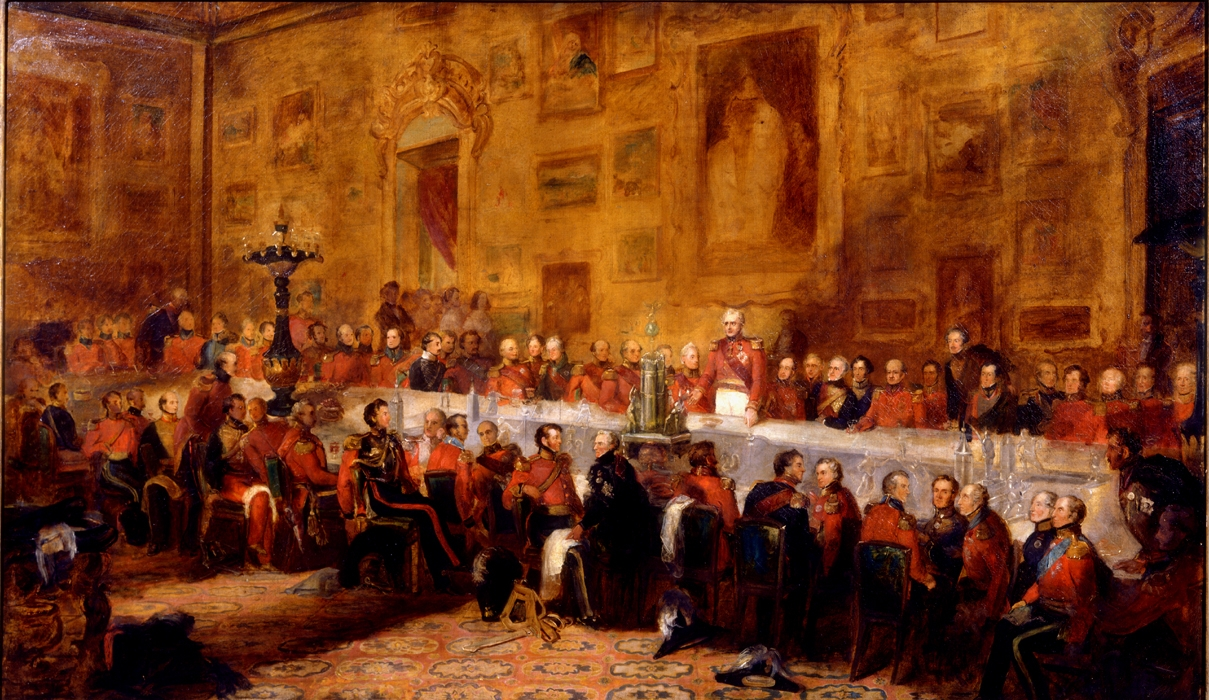
The 1836 Banquet to celebrate the Waterloo victory by William Salter

The troops returned to Portsmouth, and the 40th, with other regiments, proceeded to Flanders, and joined the army assembled near Brussels, in time to share in the memorable victory of Waterloo, during which he had a horse killed. On their arrival of the Allies in Paris, Arthur Wellesley, 1st Duke of Wellington, in acknowledgment of Major Stretton's services, appointed him commandant of the 15th arrondissement of Paris. He was awarded the silver medal for services at Waterloo.

On 21 June 1817, he obtained the brevet rank of Lieutenant-Colonel for special services.

On the corps being ordered to New South Wales, he retired on half-pay and spent several years travelling in Europe, returning occasionally to Lenton. Colonel Stretton was given a Companionship of the Order of the Bath. Stretton was a guest at the Duke of Wellington annual banquet which took place on the anniversary of the battle of Waterloo. Stretton and all the other invitees are included in William Salter's 1836 painting of The Waterloo Banquet at Apsley House. The National Portrait Gallery in London has a three quarter length portrait of Stretton which was painted in preparation for William Salter's painting of the Duke of Wellington's annual banquet.

== Family ==
Stretton married twice. On 3 March 1821, he married the Honourable Catherine Jane Massey William, who was elder daughter of General the Right Hon. Nathaniel William, second Baron Clarina. She died four months after their marriage. He married again on 14 October 1830 to the Honourable Anne Handcock, whose father was 2nd Baron Castlemaine. She was to remarry after Stretton's death. There were no children as a result of either marriage.

Colonel Stretton died at Croydon on 6 February 1842, and was buried in St Peter and St Paul, Bromley, in Kent, where a plain monument marks his grave. The house in Lenton, Nottingham, that he had inherited from his father and never made his residence was left to his brother Severus.
