= Holy Trinity Church, Lenton =

Church in Nottingham, England

Coordinates: 52°56′54″N 01°10′35″W

Holy Trinity, Lenton
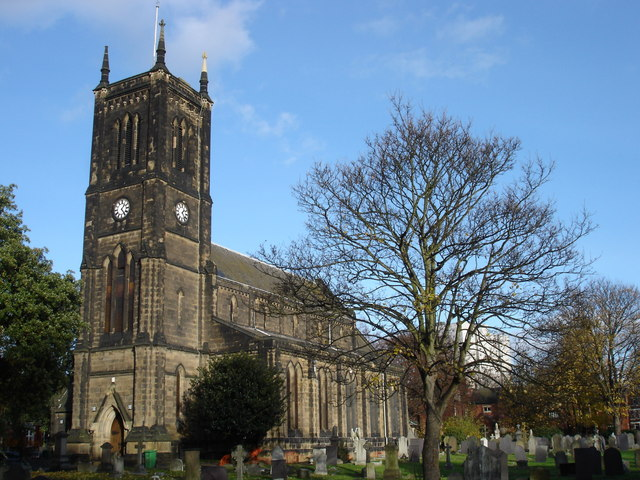
- Holy Trinity, Lenton
- Denomination: Church of England
- Churchmanship: Evangelical
- Website: www.lentonparish.org.uk

History
- Dedication: Holy Trinity

Administration
- Province: York
- Diocese: Southwell and Nottingham

Clergy
- Vicar: Revd Garreth Frank

Holy Trinity Church, Lenton is a parish church in the Church of England Diocese of Southwell, located in Lenton, Nottingham.

The church is Grade II* listed by the Department for Digital, Culture, Media and Sport as it is a particularly significant building of more than local interest.

== History ==
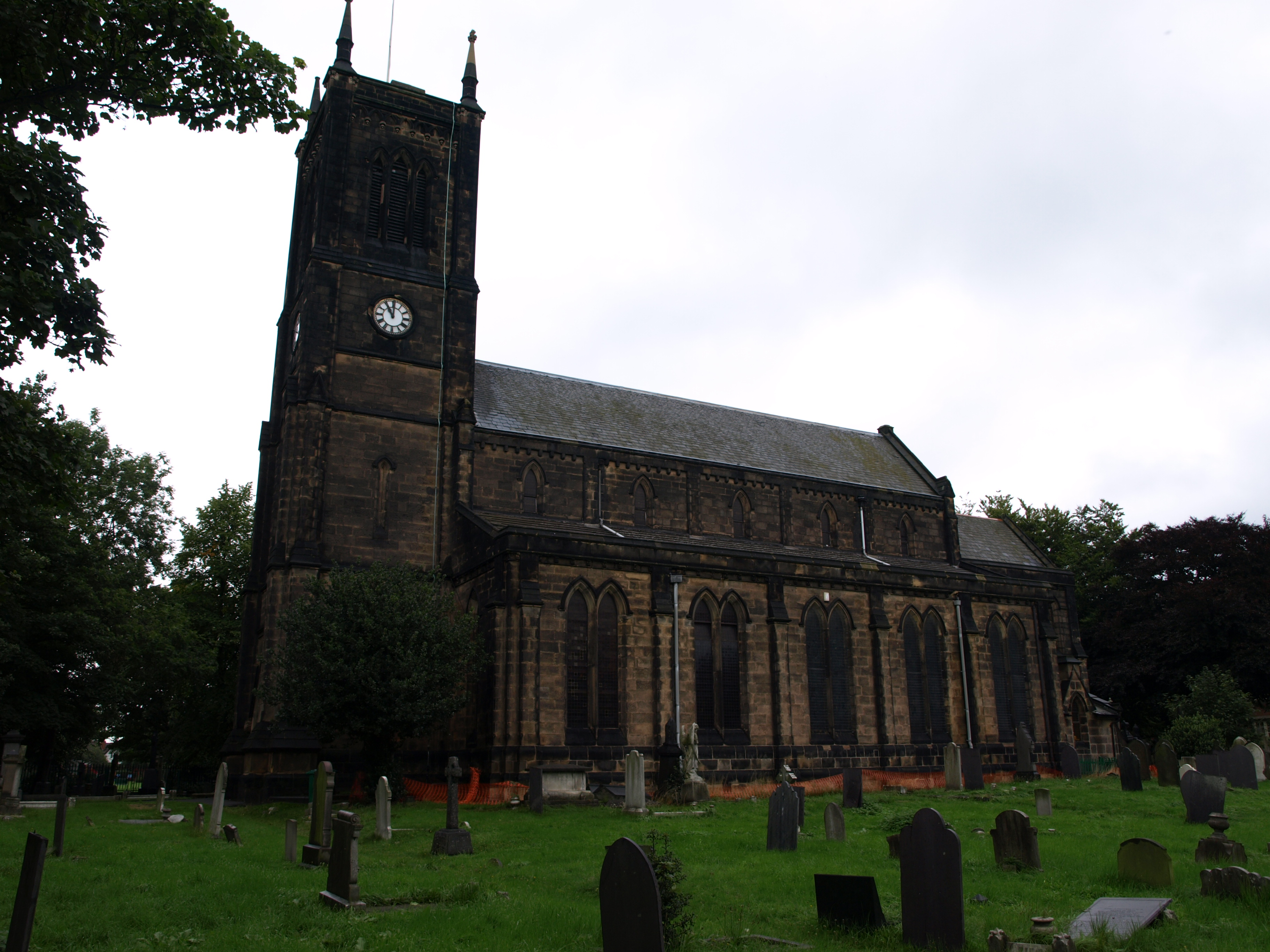
Holy Trinity Church

Holy Trinity was designed by the architect Henry Isaac Stevens and opened in 1842. It was consecrated on 6 October 1842 by the Lord Bishop of Lincoln (the Right Reverend John Jackson D.D.).

The architectural style is early English. Built in stone with a high pitched roof, it consists of a nave with clerestory, aisles to north and south, a chancel, vestry, organ-chamber, and a west end pinnacled tower. The chancel screen was designed by John Rigby Poyser and installed in 1935.

Its dimensions are 123 feet long and 57 feet wide. When opened it had seating for 660 people.

Holy Trinity now forms part of the benefice of Lenton, alongside The Priory.

== Features ==
Holy Trinity is famous for its twelfth century font which was originally built for Lenton Priory and was given to the church by Severus William Lynam Stretton in 1842.

== Memorials ==
- Albert Ball on the north wall. Captain in the Royal Flying Corps who was awarded the Victoria Cross.

== List of incumbents ==
- George Brown MA 1840 - 1886
- Percy Edward Smith MA 1886 - 1893
- Allan Hunter Watts 1893 - 1917 (father of suffragette activist Helen Kirkpatrick Watts)
- Felix Asher BD 1917 - 1922
- W. Aden Wright 1922 - 1928
- Rainald J.R. Skipper, CF, 1929 - 1954 (died in the pulpit of Holy Trinity Church, Trinity Square)
- George Hill, May-Nov 1956 (killed in a bicycle accident)
- R. P. Neil MA, 1957 - 1962
- L. L. Abbott, 1963 - 1967
- R. G. Dunford, 1967 - 1980
- David Williams MA, 1981 - 1987
- Lloyd Scott, 1989 - 2003
- W, Robert Lovatt MA, 1994 - 2004
- Martin Kirkbride, 2005 - 2011
- Megan Smith, 2012 - 2021
- Garreth Frank, 2022 -

== Clock and bells ==
An eight-day church clock was built in 1844 by Samuel Holland of Barker Gate, Nottingham. It was 3 ft 4in wide and 3 ft 6in high, with a dead beat escapement. This was replaced in 1950 with a new electric clock by G. & F. Cope.

The tower has a set of eight bells. The church was originally only provided with one bell, but five more were added in 1856. In 1902, two more bells were added, given by the brothers Frederick Ball and Albert Ball. The latter was the father of the First World War ace Albert Ball.

== Organ ==
The organ was built by Messrs. Bevington and Sons, and was opened on 22 October 1846, and was moved and enlarged by Charles Lloyd in 1870. A new organ by Brindley & Foster replaced this and was opened on 31 May 1906 at evensong with a recital by F.E. Hollingshead, organist of St Andrew's Church, Bath.

=== Organists ===
- Mrs. Cooper 1846 -
- Francis Marshall Ward 1865 - 1867
- Charles Rogers 1867 - ???? (formerly organist of St Mark's Church, Nottingham)
- Fred Harvey 1883 - 1919
- Vernon Sydney Read 1919 – 1922 (afterwards organist of St. Mary's Church, Nottingham)
- Charles Pickard 1924 - 1951 (Formerly organist of Hucknall Parish Church. Afterwards organist St. Andrew's Church, Nottingham)
- W. Harry Bland 1951 - 1982 ?

== See also ==
- Grade II* listed buildings in Nottinghamshire
- Listed buildings in Nottingham (Dunkirk and Lenton ward)

== Sources ==
- The Buildings of England, Nottinghamshire. Nikolaus Pevsner
