= Nottingham Castle Gate Hospital =

Castle Gate Hospital
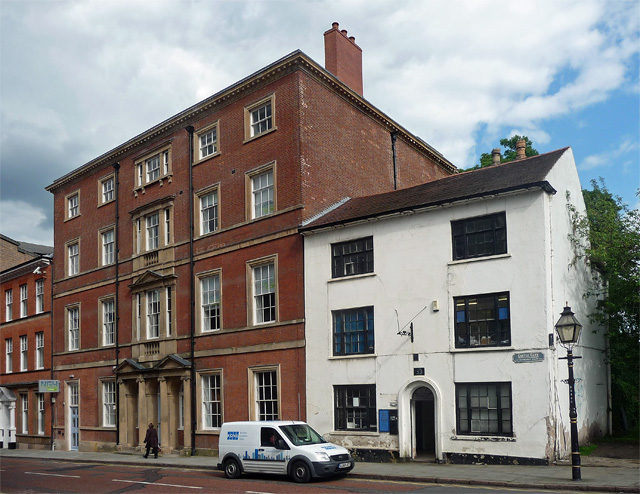
- 29-31 Castle Gate (on the left)

- Location within Nottinghamshire

Geography
- Location: Nottingham, Nottinghamshire, England, United Kingdom
- Coordinates: 52.9509°N 1.1511°W

Organisation
- Care system: NHS England
- Type: Women's Hospital

History
- Founded: 1875
- Closed: 1923

Links
- Lists: Hospitals in England

Castle Gate Hospital, also known as 29 & 31, Castle Gate or the Nottingham Hospital for Women, is a former women's hospital in Castle Gate, Nottingham, England.

== History ==
=== As a hospital ===
The hospital included an outpatient department which opened on 24 September 1875 and in the first year of opening 364 patients were seen with 2,271 attendances. There were initially only 2 inpatient beds but the number of these had increased to 8 by 1 July 1876, with reports of beds being almost completely filled thereafter for that first year with 33 admissions. All patients had to pay fees with the total revenue of £55 9s. 3d. from outpatients, £42 14s. 6d. from inpatients, making a total of £98 3s. 9d in 1875-1876. In that first year it was reported that there were no deaths. Early references to the Castle Gate hospital named it simply as the Nottingham Hospital for Women.

The hospital's opening was met with some "local professional annoyance", with the BMJ noting that "so quietly was it managed, that, until an announcement appeared one morning in the Nottingham journals stating the fact that a new Hospital for Women had been opened the day before, scarcely a medical man in the neighbourhood had heard that it was likely to come into existence".

By 1886, the year after the Samaritan Hospital for Women in Raleigh Street opened, the Annual Reports were referring to expenses exceeding income even though patients were reporting coming from as far as Leicester and Derby. The outpatient department had 697 patients with 3,975 attendances and 75 inpatients.

In 1923 the hospital merged with Samaritan Hospital to become the Nottingham Women's Hospital in Peel Street.

=== Subsequent history ===
The buildings were grade-II listed on 11 August 1952 and housed the Radio Trent and Trent FM from 1975 to 2007. Following an investment of over £5m and 2 years of work, NGY myplace opened on 10 April 2012 offering a range of services for young people including a fitness suite, recording studio, counselling and health services.

29-31 Castle Gate is reputedly haunted by several ghosts including a woman resembling a matron, an elderly woman dressed in black, a man in military uniform, young officers of the cavalry regiment and a soldier riding a white horse through the stairwells. In the 1990s, whilst Trent FM broadcast it was reported that the heavy soundproof doors would open and close themselves.
