= William de Ferrers =

William de Ferrers or Guillaume de Ferrières may refer to:

- William de Ferrers, 3rd Earl of Derby (d. 1190)
- William de Ferrers, 4th Earl of Derby (c. 1198–c. 1247)
- William de Ferrers, 5th Earl of Derby (1193–1254)
- Guillaume de Ferrières (c. 1150 – ?April 1204), the Vidame de Chartres, a French trouvère

== See also ==
- William de Ferrers School, a secondary school in South Woodham Ferrers, Essex
