= William Stretton =

English architect

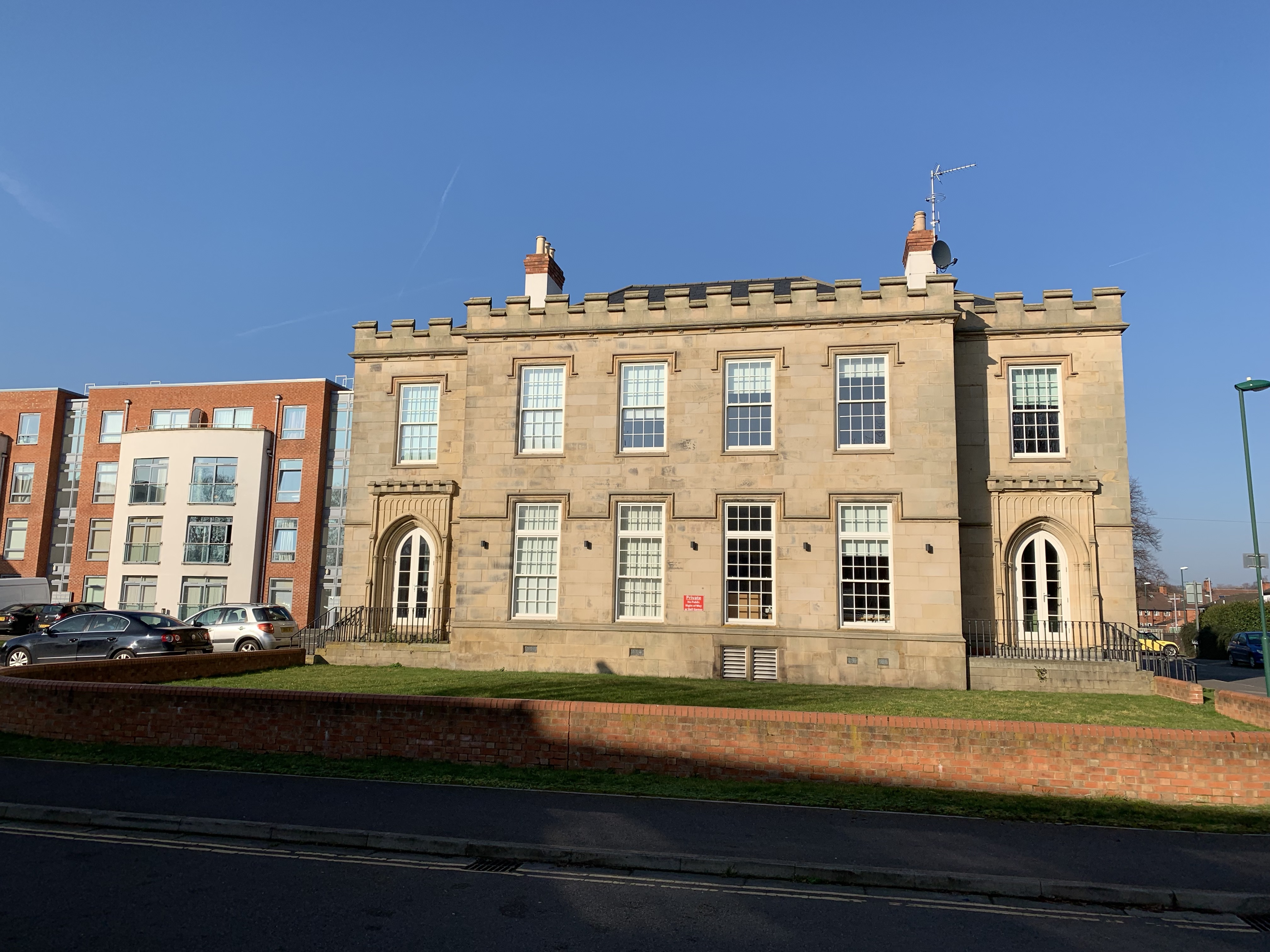
Bishops House (originally known as Lenton Priory) ca. 1802

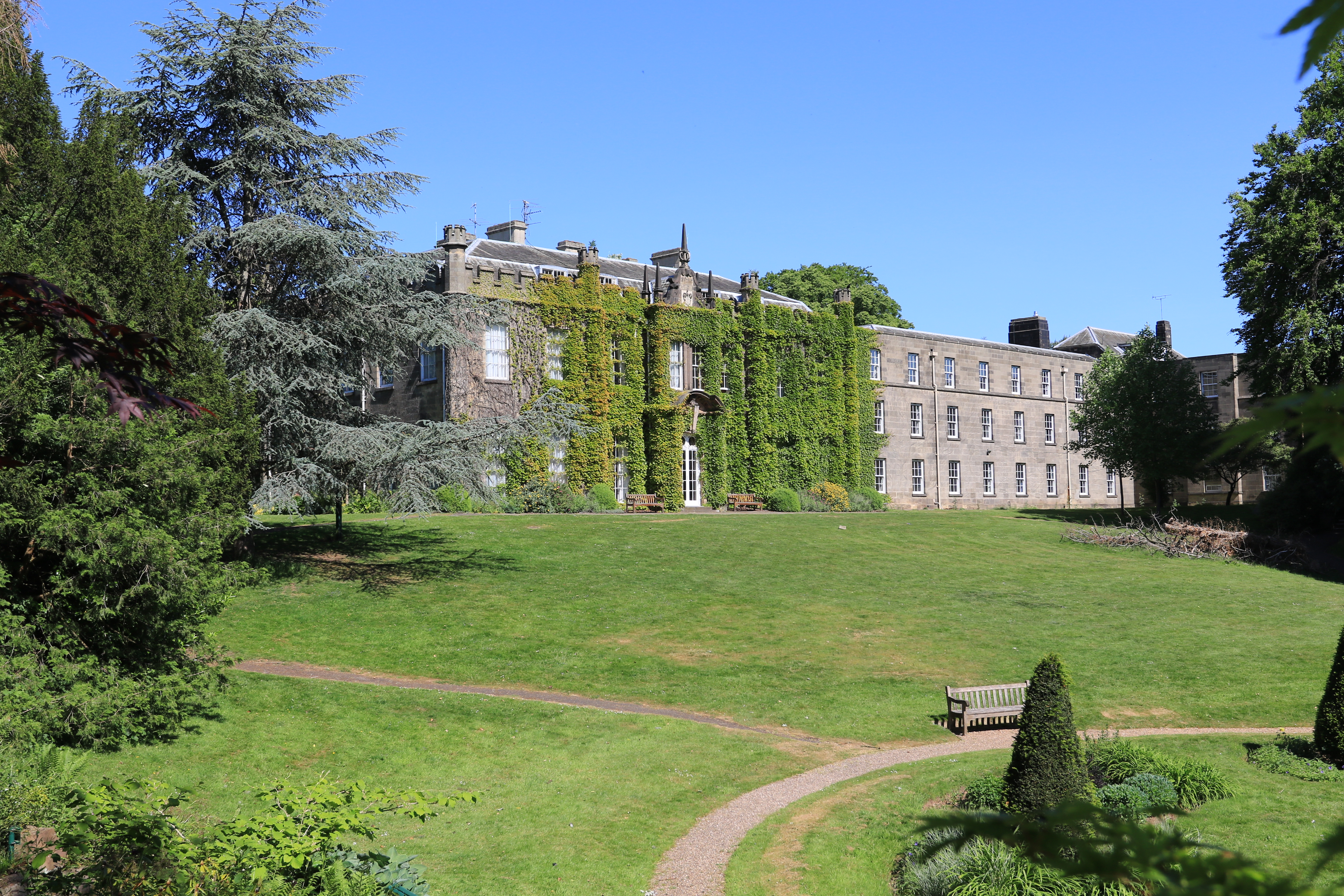
Hugh Stewart Hall (originally known as Lenton Hall), ca. 1804

William Stretton (April 1755 – 12 March 1828) was a builder and architect based in Nottingham.

== Family ==
He was the eldest child of Samuel Stretton and was baptised at Lenton on 20 April 1755.

He married Suzanna Lynam, daughter of William Lynam, of Eakring, on 22 June 1778 in Eakring. The marriage produced six children.

He died in his house at Lenton Priory on 12 March 1828. His death was announced in the Nottingham Journal

“On Wednesday, the 12th inst, in the 73 rd year of his age, after a long and painful affliction, sustained with true Christian fortitude and resignation, William Stretton, Esq., of Lenton Priory. Words would but faintly convey the deep grief which his irreparable loss has occasioned to those who knew his worth. In him antiquarians have lost a fund of general and useful knowledge, and the poor a warm and benevolent friend.

== Business ==
He started as an architect and builder in Nottingham in partnership with his father, and took over the business when his father retired. In 1788 he built what is now 43, 45 and 47 in Castle Gate. In the 1790s he made some changes to Newdigate House. In 1799 he is listed as a builder on the Long Row,

He rebuilt the Nottingham Exchange and restored St Mary's Church, Nottingham and St Peter's Church, Nottingham. He built St. James' Church, Standard Hill in 1808 and three houses between 1810 and 1814 on Standard Hill when this area was first developed.

He acquired a portion of land which had previously been the site of Lenton Priory and built a house there which he called Lenton Priory. This was occupied by the Sisters of Nazareth from 1880 who extended it.

He made a series of excavations on the site of Lenton Priory and discovered a magnificent Norman font which is now housed in Holy Trinity Church, Lenton.
