= Samaritan Hospital Nottingham =

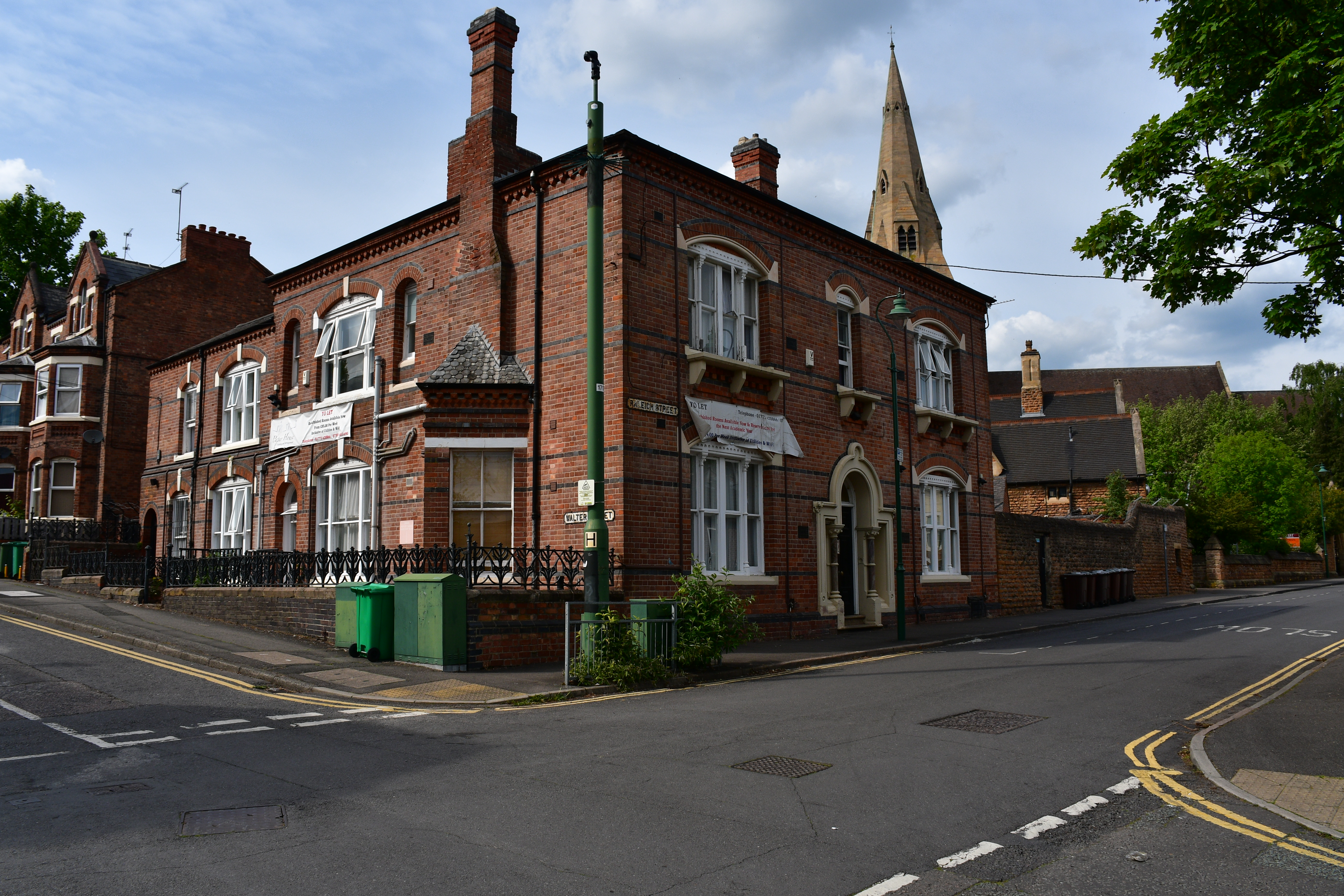
- St Mary's House in May 2021. The Samaritan Hospital was located in this building until 1923.

- Location within Nottinghamshire

Geography
- Location: Nottingham, Nottinghamshire, England, United Kingdom
- Coordinates: 52.9594°N 1.1622°W

Organisation
- Type: Women's Hospital

History
- Founded: 1885
- Closed: 1923

Links
- Lists: Hospitals in England

The Samaritan Hospital (or Nottingham Samaritan Hospital) was a hospital in Raleigh Street, Nottingham, England.

== History ==
The hospital opened in March 1885 in a building which had originally been known as Sandfield House. The Raleigh Bicycle Company was founded on the same street, just two years later, in 1887.

In the 1894 White's Directory of Nottinghamshire the following was listed in relation to the hospital:

The Samaritan Hospital for women in Raleigh Street was founded in 1885 for in-patients, and a department for out-patients at 5 Broad Street, during which time to December. 31, 1892, 16,278 patients have received medical advice. President, the Duke of Portland; honorary medical officers, Mr. George Elder, M.D., Mr E. B. Truman, M.D., and Mr H Michie, M.B., C.M.; honorary secretary, Mr J. A. Simpson; matron, Miss Paget.

In 1923 it merged with Nottingham Castle Gate Hospital, 29-31 Castle Gate, to become the Nottingham Women's Hospital in Peel Street. The building in Raleigh Street became a private nursing facility known as St Mary's Nursing Home which closed in 1972.
