= Nottingham Women's Hospital =

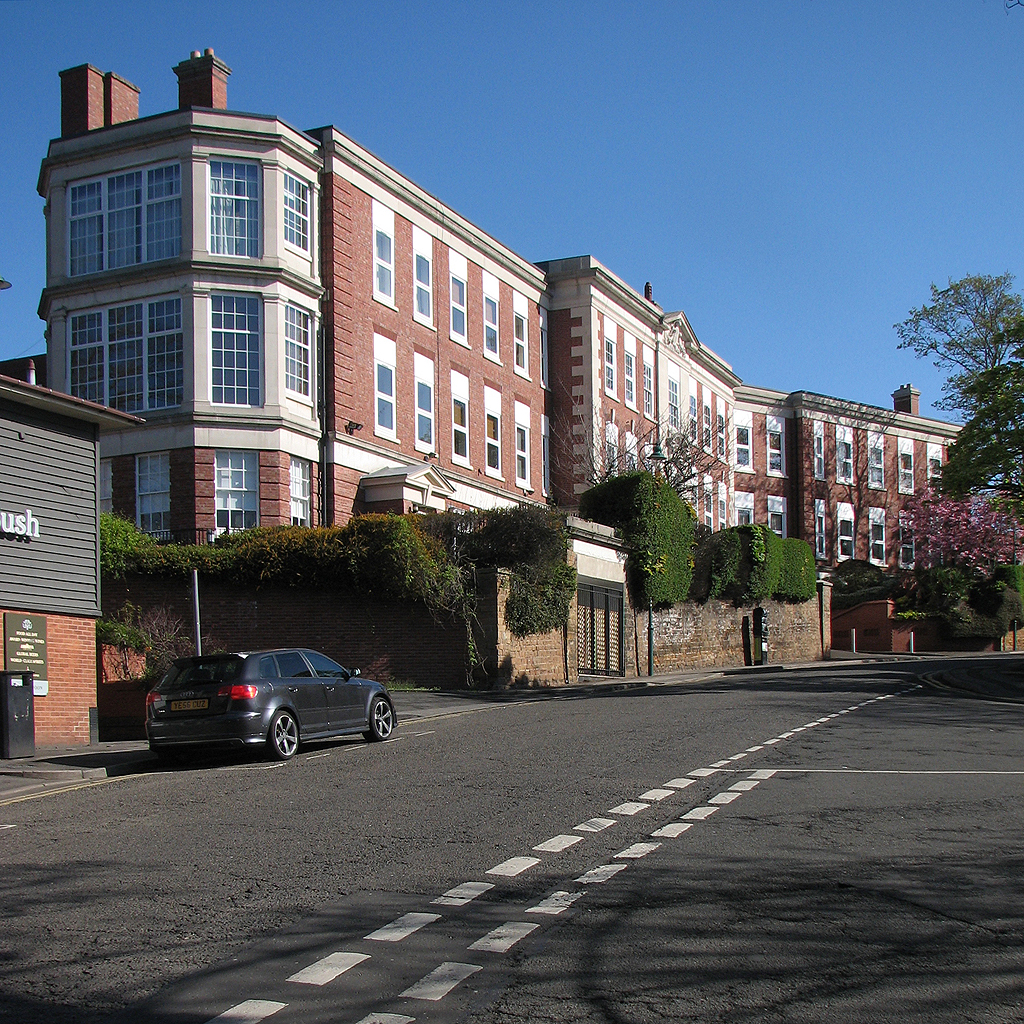
- Nottingham Women's Hospital (now converted into flats)

- Location within Nottinghamshire

Geography
- Location: Nottingham, Nottinghamshire, England, United Kingdom
- Coordinates: 52.9599°N 1.1555°W

Organisation
- Care system: NHS England
- Type: Women's Hospital

History
- Founded: 1923
- Closed: 1981

Links
- Lists: Hospitals in England

Nottingham Women's Hospital, colloquially known as "Peel Street", was a maternity hospital which closed in November 1981. Its records are held at the Manuscripts and Special Collections, The University of Nottingham.

== History ==
The hospital was inaugurated as a result of a merger between Nottingham Castle Gate Hospital and Samaritan Hospital Nottingham. It was thought that the two hospitals unnecessarily duplicated work. The new hospital, which was built on a site previously occupied by a building known as Southfield House, became operational in 1923, and then officially opened on 5 November 1929. Patients began to enter in 1930.

After medical services had been transferred to Queen's Medical Centre, Nottingham, the hospital closed in November 1981 and the site was partly cleared. The main building was converted into flats, now called Charleston House, in 1982. In June 2011 another building on the site was refurbished, extended and occupied by public house chain Wetherspoons. The licensed premises is called The Gooseberry Bush, after the traditional humorous description of where babies come from. The licensed premises opened on 12 July 2011.
