= Lenton, Nottingham =

Area of Nottingham, England

Coordinates: 52.949°N 1.175°W

Lenton
- Suburb
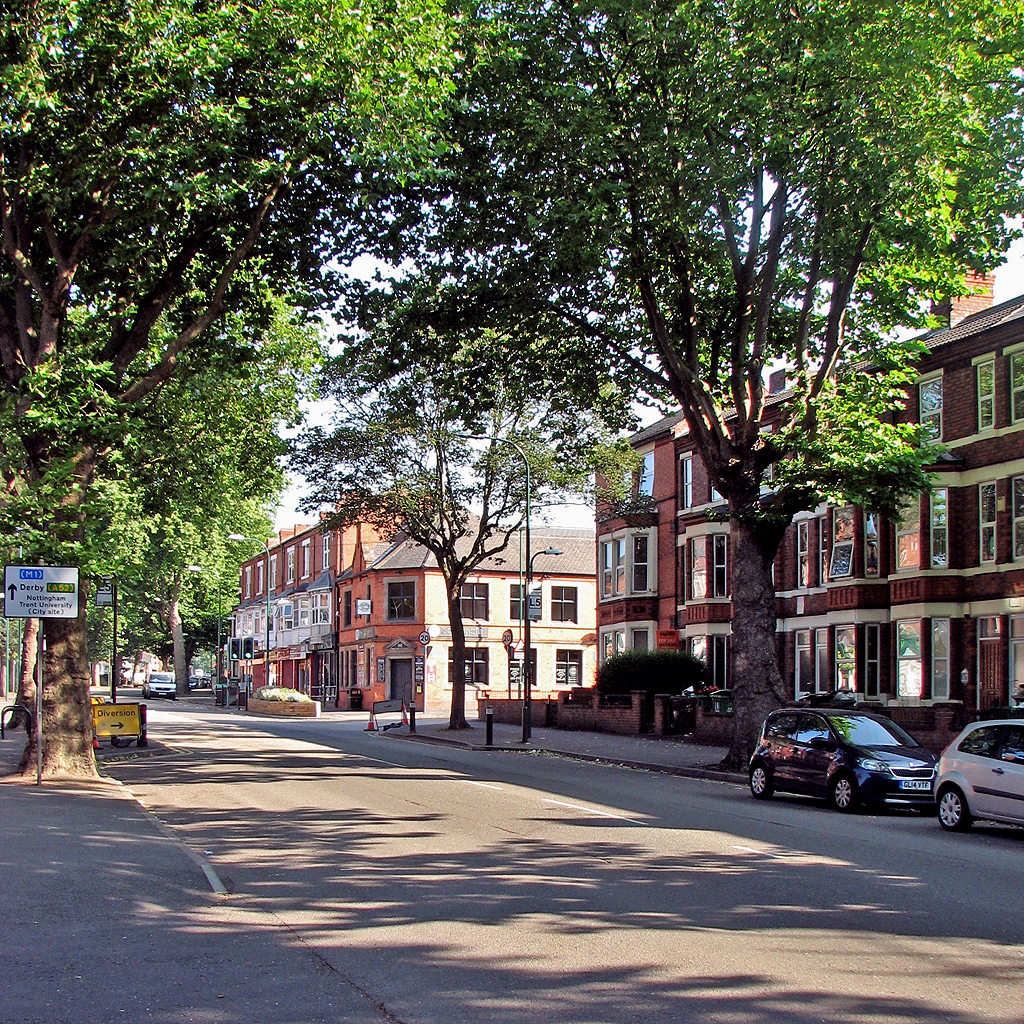
- Lenton Boulevard

- Location within Nottinghamshire
- OS grid reference: SK 55425 39422
- Unitary authority: Nottingham
- Ceremonial county: Nottinghamshire
- Region: East Midlands
- Country: England
- Sovereign state: United Kingdom
- Post town: NOTTINGHAM
- Postcode district: NG7
- Dialling code: 0115
- Police: Nottinghamshire
- Fire: Nottinghamshire
- Ambulance: East Midlands
- UK Parliament: Nottingham South

Lenton is an area and suburb of the city of Nottingham, in the Nottingham district, in the ceremonial county of Nottinghamshire, England. Most of Lenton is situated in the electoral ward of 'Dunkirk and Lenton', with a small part in 'Wollaton East and Lenton Park'.

Originally a separate agricultural village, Lenton became part of the town of Nottingham in 1877, when the town's boundaries were enlarged. Nottingham became a city as part of the Diamond Jubilee celebrations of Queen Victoria in 1897.

== History ==
The name Lenton derives from the River Leen, which runs nearby.

Lenton and its mills on the Leen get a mention in the Domesday Book in the late 11th century: "In Lentune 4 sochmen and 4 bordars have two ploughs and a mill."

=== Lenton Priory ===
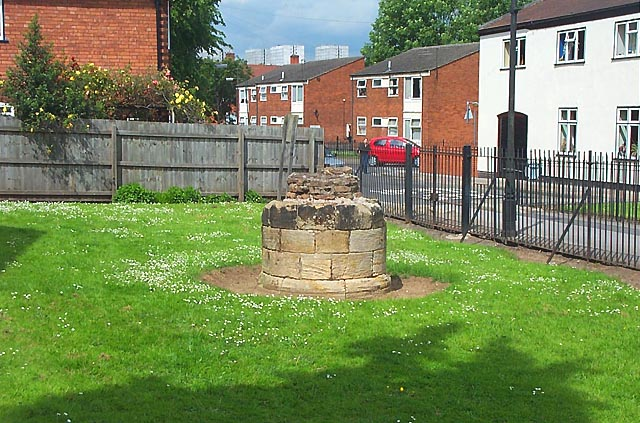
The remains of a stone column from the priory

Lenton Priory was founded in the village by William Peverel at the beginning of the 12th century. A Cluniac monastery, the priory was home to mostly French monks until the late 14th century, when it was freed from the control of its French mother-house, Cluny Abbey. From the 13th century, the priory struggled financially and was noted for "its poverty and indebtedness". The priory was dissolved in 1538, as part of King Henry VIII's dissolution of the monasteries.

Following dissolution, the priory was demolished and its lands passed through private hands. The Priory Church of St. Anthony is thought to incorporate elements of the chapel of the priory's hospital.

In 2005, Lenton celebrated the 900th anniversary of the foundation of the Priory. The centrepiece of the celebrations was a special festival held in the grounds of the Priory Church of St. Anthony, on 21 May 2005.

=== Lenton Fair ===
King Henry II granted permission for the priory to hold an annual fair on The Feast of Saint Martin: 11 November. Lenton Fair originally ran for 8 days before being extended to 12 days. The fair caused numerous disputes with the mayor and burgesses of the town of Nottingham as no markets could be held within Nottingham during the period in the Lenton fair. In return, the people of Nottingham were given special rates to hire booths at the fair. The Fair continued after the demise of the Priory, though its length was gradually reduced. Its emphasis slowly changed and, in 1584, it was described as a horse-fair when servants of Mary, Queen of Scots attended. By the 17th century, the Fair had acquired a reputation as a great fair for all sorts of horses. In the 19th century, it was largely frequented by farmers and horse dealers. The Fair finally ceased operating at the beginning of the 20th century.

=== 16th-20th centuries ===
From the closure of the priory in 1538 until the late 18th century, Lenton was primarily a rural agricultural village.

In the 1790s, the Nottingham Canal was constructed, passing through the village. This led to industrialisation and population growth, with a number of factories built and the population increasing from 893 to 3077 between 1801 and 1831. The area known as New Lenton was developed on agricultural land separate from the village, to accommodate the expanding residential and industrial needs both from the village and the neighbouring town Nottingham. As with many other villages surrounding Nottingham, many of the residents were involved in the manufacture and trade of lace.

Originally a separate village, Lenton became part of the town of Nottingham in 1877, when the town's boundaries were enlarged. Nottingham became a city as part of the Diamond Jubilee celebrations of Queen Victoria in 1897.

Both the University of Nottingham and Queen's Medical Centre are within Lenton. This has increased the amount of student accommodation available, hence making the location heavily populated with students.

=== Civil parish ===
In 1891 the parish had a population of 10,957. On 26 March 1897 the parish was abolished and merged with Nottingham.

== Geography ==
Administratively, Lenton falls within the Nottingham South constituency. Most of the area lies within the electoral ward of Dunkirk and Lenton. The "Lenton Triangle" area (bounded by Derby, Faraday and Ilkeston Roads) is considered by most residents to be part of Lenton, due to its similar character; it falls into a neighbouring ward Radford and Park.

Lenton is largely a residential area and is popular with students at the nearby University of Nottingham who choose to live off-campus. Indeed, the high proportion of students has led some local residents in recent years to campaign against what they perceive as the studentification of the area.

=== Neighbouring areas ===
- Dunkirk to the south and west
- Radford to the north
- The Park Estate to the east

== Notable buildings ==
=== Marcus Garvey Ballroom ===
The Marcus Garvey Ballroom is a local West Indian community centre managed by West Indian Cavaliers, and located on Lenton Boulevard. Named after Marcus Mosiah Garvey, this venue is famous for its large music hall, the Ballroom, which has a capacity of around 1000. Events include clubnights run by students from the universities and live acts.

The Marcus Garvey Day Care Centre also hosts day care facilities for African Caribbean elders, with a wide range of activities including bingo, raffle, needlework, dominoes, arts and crafts and a prayer meeting held on Friday mornings. Fresh meals are available for a small charge. The centre has a library, an organ, music system, TV and video facilities. The building is wheelchair accessible.

This building was formerly part of the Raleigh bicycle company's development in Lenton, now largely demolished to make way for a new University of Nottingham campus. For much of the twentieth century, it was the largest bicycle factory in the world.

=== The Lenton Centre ===
The Lenton Centre in Willoughby Street is a local community centre with gym and swimming pool. Previously a council facility, it was bought by local residents in 2004 for £10 when it was threatened by closure.

=== Other institutions ===
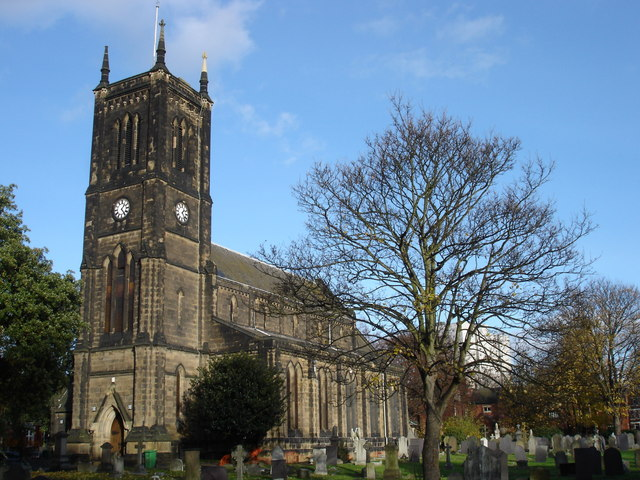
Holy Trinity Church

- Lenton is home to the Queen's Medical Centre, one of the largest teaching hospitals in Europe.
- Holy Trinity Church, Lenton
- Priory Church of St. Anthony, Lenton
- William Woodsend Memorial Homes
- Albert Ball Memorial Homes
- Lenton Methodist Church
- Savoy Cinema, Nottingham

== Notable residents ==
Albert Ball VC (1896 –1917), Britain's first and probably still its best known 'Air Ace' was born at 32 Lenton Boulevard and went to school at the Lenton Church School. The Albert Ball Memorial Homes in Church Street are a striking and lasting monument to the brief life of Albert Ball. After a series of moves to houses throughout Lenton, his family settled at 43 Lenton Road. His father Sir Albert Ball, rose in status from a plumber to become Lord Mayor of Nottingham.

Helen Kirkpatrick Watts (1881 – 18 August 1972) was brought up in Lenton where her father was the vicar. She achieved local notoriety when she was first arrested for protesting about women's suffrage outside the Houses of Parliament in 1909.

== See also ==
- Listed buildings in Nottingham (Dunkirk and Lenton ward)
