= Golden Cross, Cardiff =

Listed pub in Wales

Golden Cross
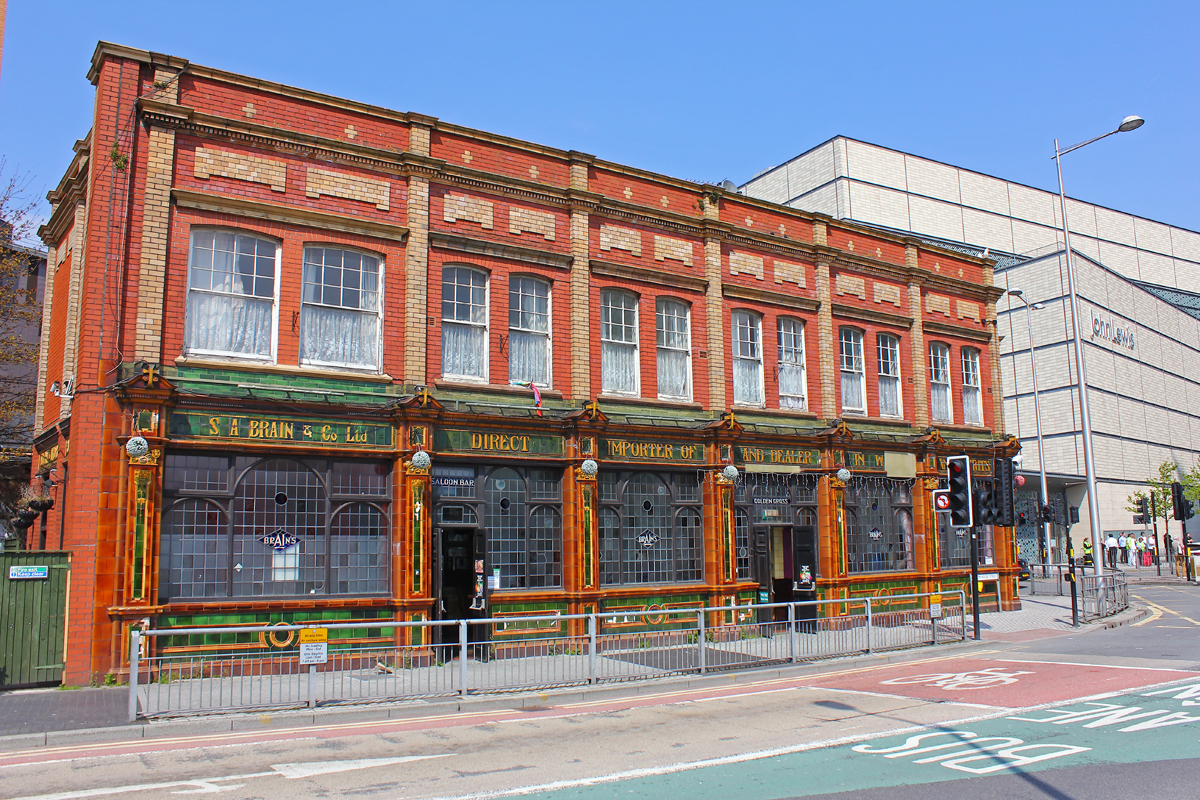
- The pub in 2014

General information
- Type: Public house
- Location: 283 Hayes Bridge Road, Cardiff, Wales
- Coordinates: 51°28′37″N 3°10′28″W
- Completed: c. 1903; 123 years ago
- Client: Brains Brewery
- Owner: Song Capital

Design and construction
- Designations

Listed Building – Grade II
- Official name: Golden Cross public house
- Designated: 19 May 1975
- Reference no.: 13647

Website
- cardiffgoldencross.com

The Golden Cross is a Grade II listed public house at the junction of Customhouse Street and Hayes Bridge Road in the centre of Cardiff, Wales. Although a pub has occupied the site since 1849, the present building dates from around 1903, when it was rebuilt for Brains Brewery. Its historic interior has led to its inclusion on the Campaign for Real Ale (CAMRA)'s National Inventory of Historic Pub Interiors and recognition as one of the CAMRA Pub Heritage Group's ten most unspoilt pubs.

== History ==
A public house has occupied the site since 1849, when it was known as the Shields and Newcastle Tavern. It was renamed the Castle Inn in 1855 and adopted its present name in 1863. According to the Cardiff historian Brian Lee, the Golden Cross "developed a reputation as the smartest brothel in town" during the 19th century. In 1903–04, the building was rebuilt in its present form for Brains Brewery.

The Golden Cross has been linked to an alleged fight involving the future world heavyweight boxing champion Rocky Marciano while he was stationed in Wales with the United States Army during the Second World War. Before the war, the British Union of Fascists leader Oswald Mosley attempted to hold a meeting at the pub, but opposition forced him to abandon the event and return to London.

On 19 May 1975, Cadw designated the Golden Cross a Grade II listed building. In 1979 it was threatened with demolition as part of a road-widening scheme, but was reprieved following a campaign led by the South Wales Echo. In 2010, the pub was included on the Campaign for Real Ale (CAMRA)'s National Inventory of Historic Pub Interiors and was named as one of the CAMRA Pub Heritage Group's ten most unspoilt pubs.

The Golden Cross is known as a gay-friendly venue and hosts regular drag acts and other entertainment. In 2004, it was voted the UK's best gay pub. As of September 2026, the freehold was owned by Song Capital and the pub was operated by Marston's under lease.

== Architecture ==
=== Exterior ===
A two-storey pub built in red brick, with yellow brick detailing. The principal frontage comprises six bays, including a wider bay at one end and an angled corner bay, with two further bays extending along each side. The upper floor features pairs of round-headed windows set beneath a continuous projecting band, with decorative panels below and a parapet above. At street level, the building retains an ornate tiled pub frontage with Venetian-style windows, incorporating green and gold tiles, raised lettering to the fascia, and decorative tiled panels to the pilasters and lower sections beneath the windows.

=== Interior ===
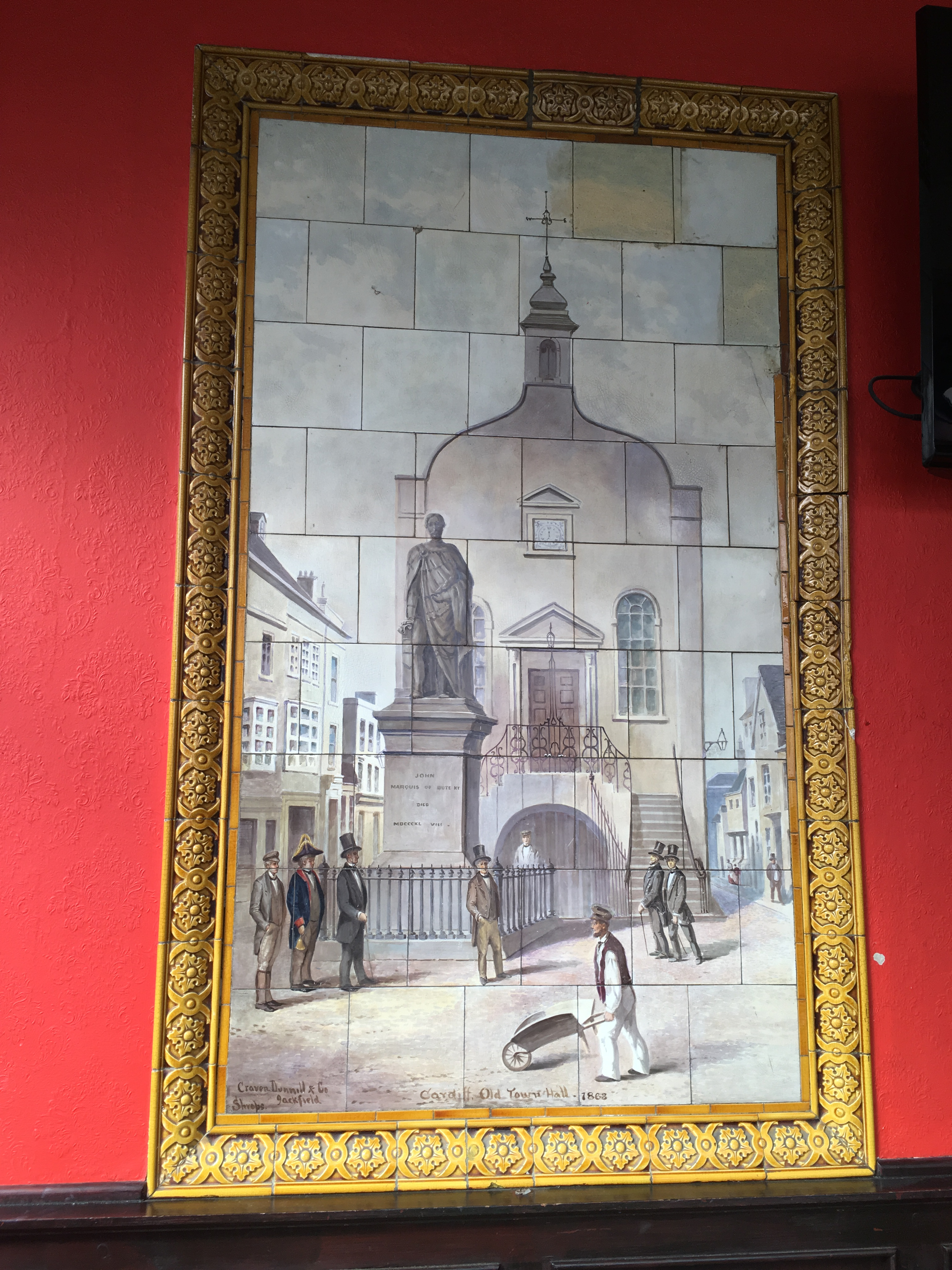
Tiled panel showing Cardiff's Old Town Hall and the statue of Lord Bute

CAMRA describes the Golden Cross as "the most spectacularly decorated of any in Wales". The bar tiles, featuring distinctive corner grotesques, were designed by Craven Dunnill of Shropshire. The interior has several decorative pictorial panels of tiles that depict Cardiff Castle, Brains Brewery in 1890, and Cardiff's Old Town hall with a statue of Lord Bute from St Mary's Street in 1863.

The Golden Cross has one of fourteen remaining ceramic bar counters in the United Kingdom. The other ceramic counter in Wales is located at the in Waterloo Hotel in the Newport district of Pillgwenlly. Dunnill replicated the design with grotesques at the Mountain Daisy pub in Sunderland, and the Gunmakers Arms in Birmingham. An almost identical tiled frieze design is at the White Swan pub in Birmingham.

== Gallery ==
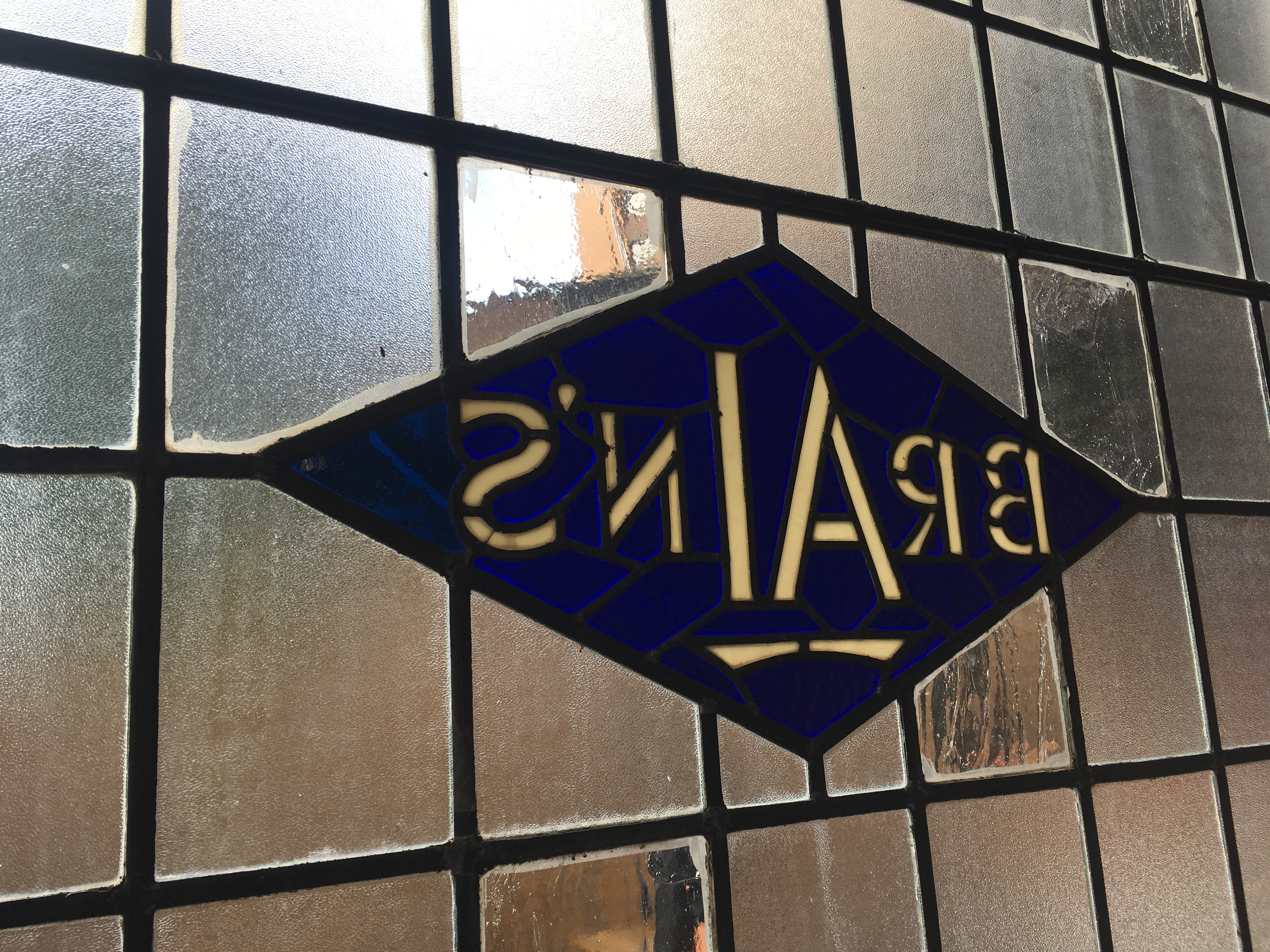
A Brains Brewery logo in stained glass

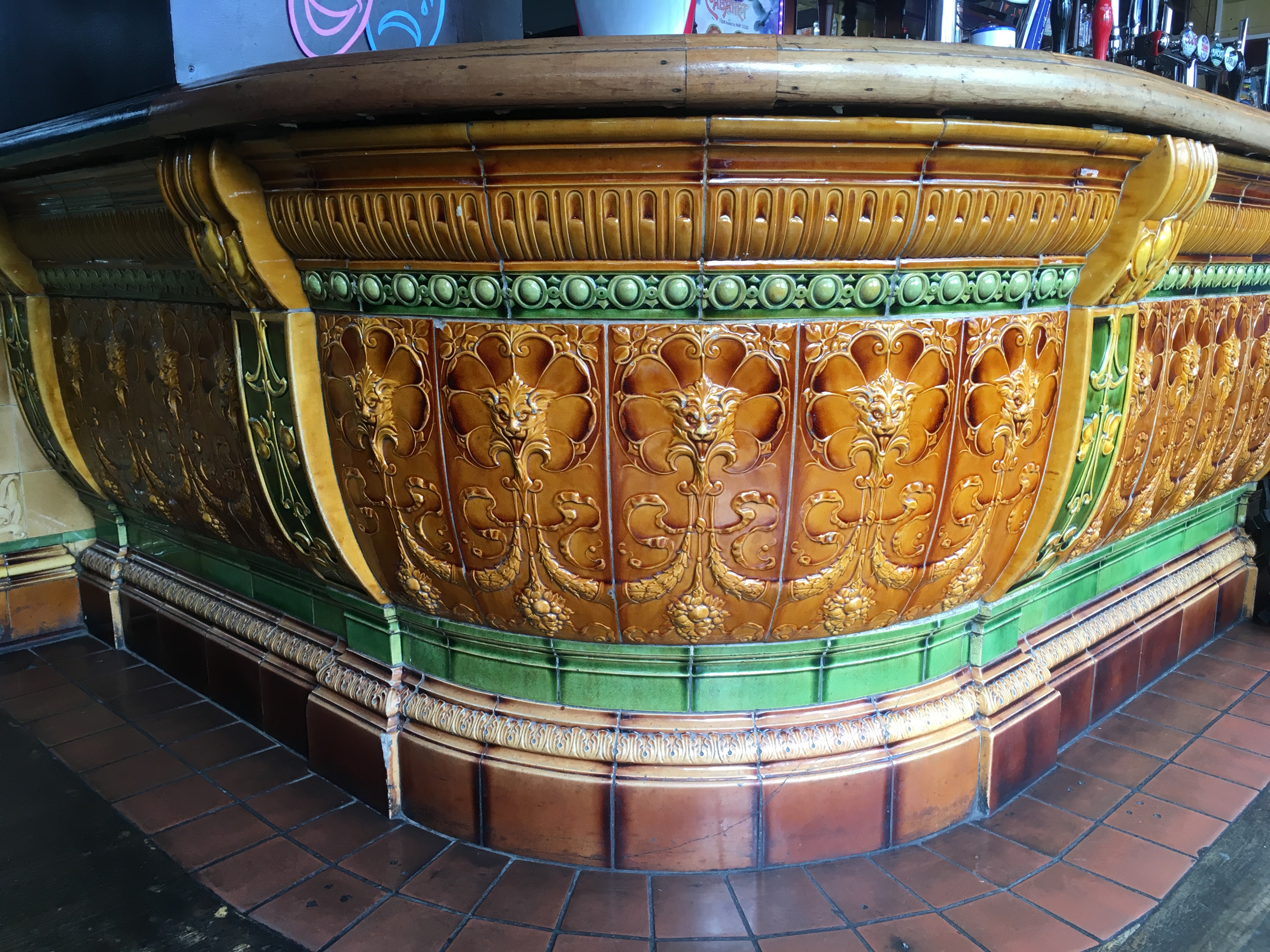
The distinctive tiled bar

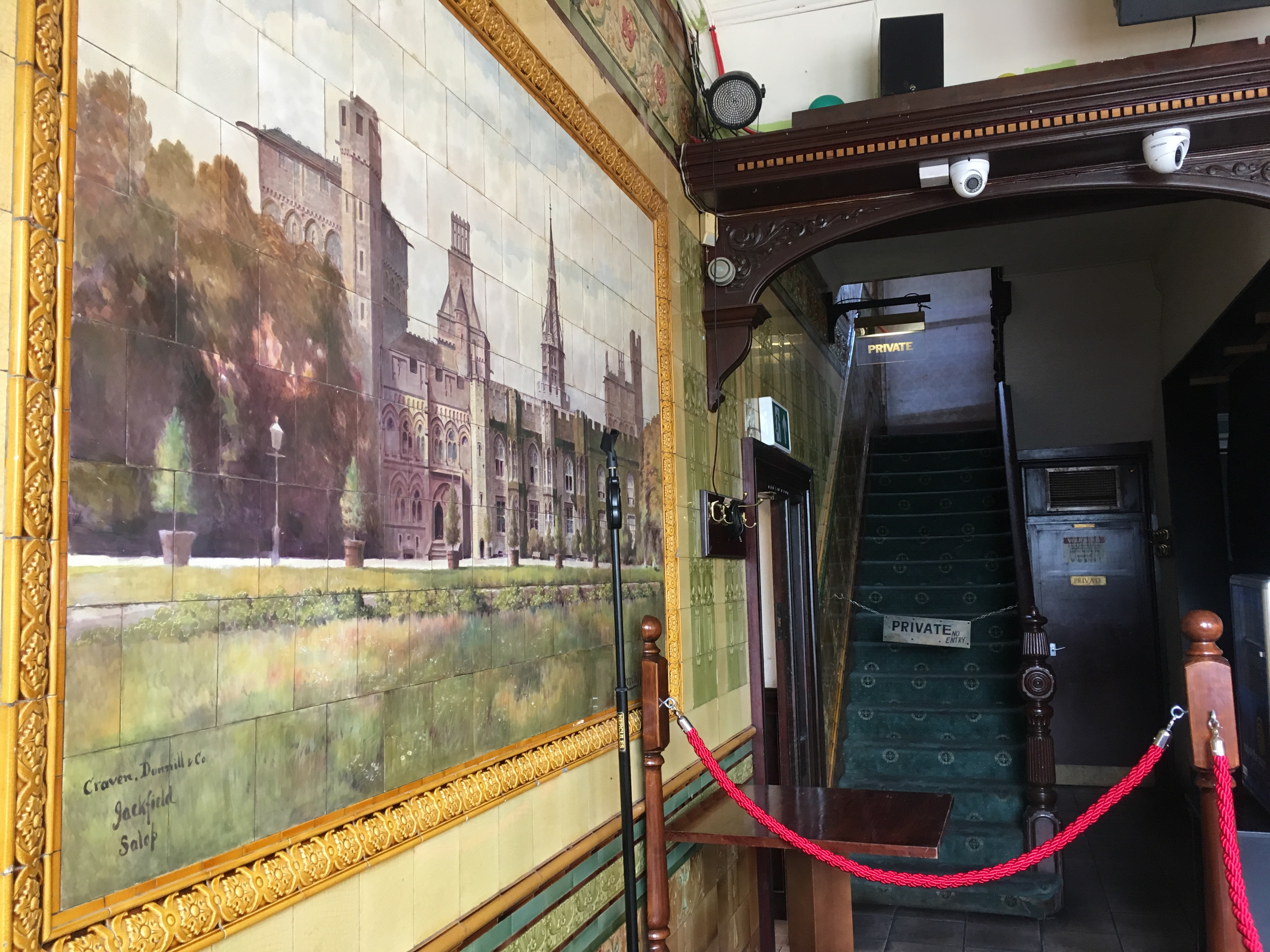
A ceramic tile display of Cardiff Castle

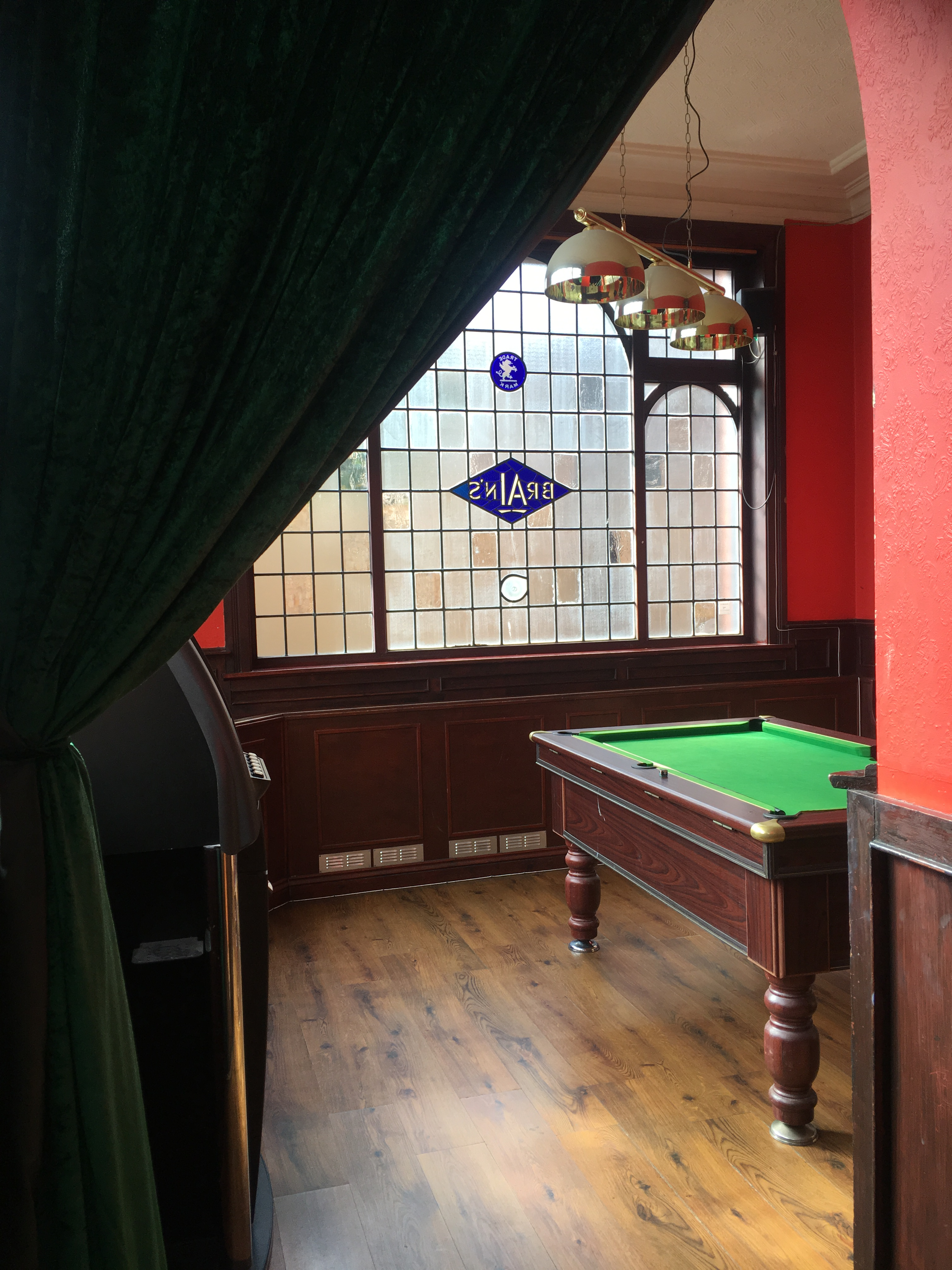
The snooker room

== See also ==
- Listed buildings in Cardiff
