= 1887 Cardiff Town Council election =

Local election in Cardiff, Wales

The 1887 Cardiff Town Council election was held on Tuesday 1 November 1887 to elect councillors to Cardiff Town Council in Cardiff, Glamorgan, Wales.

These were to be the penultimate all-Cardiff elections before the creation of the county borough in 1889. The previous elections were in November 1886 and the final town council elections were to take place on 1 November 1888.

The election saw the Liberals gain an extra four seats in Cardiff.

== Background ==
Cardiff Town Council had been created in 1836. Elections were held annually, though not all council seats were included in each contest, because the six councillors in each ward stood down for election in three-yearly rotation.

The council consisted of 30 councillors who were elected by the town's voters and ten aldermen who were elected by the councillors. Ten seats were up for election in November 1888.

== Overview of the result ==
Contests took place in four of the five Cardiff electoral wards in November 1887. In the East ward the two councillors were elected unopposed.

The weather was exceptionally poor on polling day, but the South Wales Echo reported a strong turnout of the town's Irish voters. There was also noticeably strong campaigning by the Liberal Party, with many carriages made available to transport 'lady voters' to the polling booths.

=== Council composition ===
The Liberal Party saw an increase of four seats, which made the composition of the council immediately following these elections as Conservatives 20, Liberals 19. There was one vacant alderman seat following the death of Alderman Jones. Whoever filled the post could affect the balance of the council.

== Ward results ==
=== Canton ===
Canton ward 1887
Party	Candidate	Votes	%	±%
Liberal	W. E. Vaughan *	1,381		
Liberal	J. R. James	1,366		
Conservative	J. W. A. Stevens *	935		
Liberal hold		Swing		
Liberal gain from Conservative		Swing		

=== East ===
East ward 1887
Party	Candidate	Votes	%	±%
Conservative	Sir Morgan Morgan *	Unopposed		
Liberal	P. Price *	Unopposed		
Conservative hold				
Liberal hold				

=== Roath ===
Roath ward 1887
Party	Candidate	Votes	%	±%
Liberal	E. F. Kennard	1,409		
Conservative	W. J. Trounce *	1,271		
Liberal	John Sully Stowe	1,222		
Conservative	Solomon Andrews*	721		
Liberal gain from Conservative		Swing		
Conservative hold		Swing		

In such a large ward there was only one polling station, in the schoolroom in Metal Street, but interest was much stronger than normal.

=== South ===
South ward 1887
Party	Candidate	Votes	%	±%
Liberal	F. J. Beavan	574		
Liberal	W. B. Gibbs	547		
Conservative	W. C. Hurley *	500		
Conservative	V. Trayes *	463		
Liberal gain from Conservative		Swing		
Liberal gain from Conservative		Swing		

South had been regarded as a Conservative stronghold. However, with a 79% turnout and with Irish voters supporting the Liberals almost exclusively, the retiring Conservative councillors lost their seats. New councillor Beavan had stood unsuccessfully in November 1886 (previously representing the Canton ward).

=== West ===
West ward 1887
Party	Candidate	Votes	%	±%
Liberal	J. G. Proger *	645		
Conservative	R. Price	601		
Liberal	J. H. Jones *	575		
Conservative	S. Herne	455		
Liberal hold		Swing		
Conservative gain from Liberal		Swing		

There was considerable interest in the West ward election (with very large crowds at the results) because there had been no contest in the ward for many years. Mr Proger had represented the ward for nine years without having to fight a contest.

* = 'retiring' ward councillor for re-election
