= 1892 Cardiff County Borough Council election =

Local election in Cardiff, Wales

The 1892 Cardiff County Borough Council election was held on Tuesday 2 November 1892 to elect councillors to Cardiff County Borough Council in Cardiff, Wales. These were the fourth all-Cardiff elections since the creation of the county borough. The previous elections were in November 1891 and the next elections were in November 1893.

The Liberal Party remained the largest party after the election, but with reduced numbers.

== Background ==
Cardiff had become a county borough in April 1889. The council consisted of 30 councillors who were elected by the town's voters and ten aldermen who were elected by the councillors. Elections took place every November. Not all council seats were included in each contest, because the three councillors in each ward stood down for election in three-yearly rotation.

Ten councillor seats were up for public election in November 1892.

== Overview of the result ==
Contests took place in eight of the ten electoral wards. The candidates in the Central and South wards were re-elected unopposed.

The Western Mail described the 58% turnout as making the election "the most uneventful on record in the history of the town" with interest in Cardiff elections "fallen off marvellously". The Progressive Labour candidates took some votes away from the sitting Liberal candidates, except for the Cathays ward where the Liberals put their support behind the Labour nominee.

As a result of the election, the Liberal Party lost three seats, two of which were gained by the Conservatives and one by Labour candidates. The Liberals remained the largest party on the council, with 23 seats. the Conservatives had 14 seats and Labour members held two. A vacancy remained in the Cathays ward, due to the death of a Liberal councillor, Peter Price.

== Ward results ==
=== Adamsdown ===
Adamsdown ward 1892
Party	Candidate	Votes	%	±%
Liberal	Benjamin John	396	59.5	
Labour	John Ings	259	38.9	
Liberal hold		Swing		

The retiring Liberal councillor, Philip Morel, chose not to re-stand. Turnout was lowest in the Adamsdown ward, at only 39%.

=== Canton ===
Canton ward 1892
Party	Candidate	Votes	%	±%
Conservative	J. M. Gerhold	533	42.7	
Liberal	Mr Symonds *	422	33.8	
Labour	Mr Chasey	284	22.7	
Conservative gain from Liberal		Swing		

In Canton there was a marked battle between the retiring Liberal councillor, from the Cardiff Master Builders Association; and the Labour candidate, who represented the workmen's strike committee.

=== Cathays ===
Cathays ward 1892
Party	Candidate	Votes	%	±%
Lib-Lab	William S. Crossman *	660	57.9	
Conservative	Dr Morgan Williams	475	41.7	
Lib-Lab hold		Swing		

=== Central ===
Central ward 1892
Party	Candidate	Votes	%	±%
Conservative	R. Hughes *	Unopposed		
Conservative hold		Swing		

=== Grangetown ===
Grangetown ward 1892
Party	Candidate	Votes	%	±%
Conservative	Robert Johnston	531	55.0	
Liberal	Samuel Mildon *	431	44.7	
Conservative gain from Liberal		Swing		

=== Park ===
Park ward 1892
Party	Candidate	Votes	%	±%
Conservative	Tom Hurry Riches *	748	60.6	
Labour	John Richards	486	39.4	
Conservative hold		Swing		

=== Riverside ===
Riverside ward 1892
Party	Candidate	Votes	%	±%
Liberal	Noah Rees *	658	53.1	
Conservative	George Beynon Harris	581	46.9	
Liberal hold		Swing	+1.8	

=== Roath ===
Roath ward 1892
Party	Candidate	Votes	%	±%
Liberal	Joseph Ramsdale	572	63.0	
Labour	Tom Taylor	328	36.1	
Liberal hold		Swing		

=== South ===
South ward 1892
Party	Candidate	Votes	%	±%
Conservative	James Tucker *	Unopposed		
Conservative hold		Swing		

=== Splott ===
Splott ward 1892
Party	Candidate	Votes	%	±%
Liberal	E. W. Shackell *	353	55.3	
Labour	Richard Davies	279	43.7	
Liberal hold		Swing		
