= 1888 Cardiff Town Council election =

Local election in Cardiff, Wales

The 1888 Cardiff Town Council election was held on Thursday 1 November 1888 to elect councillors to Cardiff Town Council in Cardiff, Glamorgan, Wales. They took place on the same day as other local elections in Wales and England.

These were to be the last all-Cardiff elections before the creation of the county borough in 1889. The previous elections were in November 1887. The first full elections to Cardiff County Borough Council were to take place in November 1889.

The election saw the Liberals gain an extra two seats in Cardiff.

== Background ==
Cardiff Town Council had been created in 1836. Elections were held annually, though not all council seats were included in each contest, because the six councillors in each ward stood down for election in three-yearly rotation.

The council consisted of 30 councillors who were elected by the town's voters and ten aldermen who were elected by the councillors. Ten seats were up for election in November 1888.

== Overview of the result ==
Only one contest took place in November 1888, in the West electoral ward. In the Canton, East, Roath and South wards the councillors were elected unopposed.

=== Council composition ===
The Liberal Party (or 'Radicals') saw an increase of two seats. The composition of the council following these elections was Liberals 24, Conservatives 16, giving a Radical majority of eight.

== Ward results ==
=== Canton ===
Canton ward 1888
| Party | Candidate | Votes | % | ±% |
|---|---|---|---|---|
| Conservative | Samuel A. Brain * | Unopposed | | |
| Liberal | William Lewis | Unopposed | | |
| Conservative hold | | | | |
| Liberal gain from Conservative | | | | |

=== East ===
East ward 1888
| Party | Candidate | Votes | % | ±% |
|---|---|---|---|---|
| Liberal | E. Herne * | Unopposed | | |
| Liberal | D. Richards * | Unopposed | | |
| Liberal hold | | | | |
| Liberal hold | | | | |

=== Roath ===
Roath ward 1888
| Party | Candidate | Votes | % | ±% |
|---|---|---|---|---|
| Liberal | E. Beavan * | Unopposed | | |
| Conservative | T. Reynolds * | Unopposed | | |
| Liberal hold | | | | |
| Conservative hold | | | | |

=== South ===
South ward 1888
| Party | Candidate | Votes | % | ±% |
|---|---|---|---|---|
| Conservative | T. Morel * | Unopposed | | |
| Liberal | A. Rees * | Unopposed | | |
| Conservative hold | | | | |
| Liberal hold | | | | |

=== West ===
West ward 1888
| Party | Candidate | Votes | % | ±% |
|---|---|---|---|---|
| Liberal | David Jones * | 818 | | |
| Liberal | F. Jotham | 729 | | |
| Conservative | Lascelles Carr | 618 | | |
| Conservative | J. W. A. Stevens | 578 | | |
| Liberal hold | | Swing | | |
| Liberal gain from Conservative | | Swing | | |

The Liberals made a strong campaign, including the use of a Women's Brigade to bring out the vote in Temperance Town. It was reported there were fives times more vehicles available for the Liberals to transport voters to the polling station.

* = 'retiring' ward councillor for re-election
