= South Glamorganshire =

South Glamorganshire may refer to:

- South Glamorgan, a historic county in Wales
- South Glamorganshire (UK Parliament constituency)
