= John Evan Thomas =

Welsh sculptor

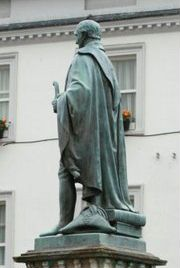
Statue of the Duke of Wellington in the centre of Brecon

John Evan Thomas, FSA (15 January 1810 – 9 October 1873) was a Welsh sculptor, notable for many sculptures both in Wales and elsewhere in the UK, such as his portrait sculptures in London. He was especially notable for the Death of Tewdrig which was exhibited at the Great Exhibition of 1851, and for his two bronze statues of Henry de Loundres and William, Earl of Pembroke in the chamber of the House of Lords.

== Biography ==
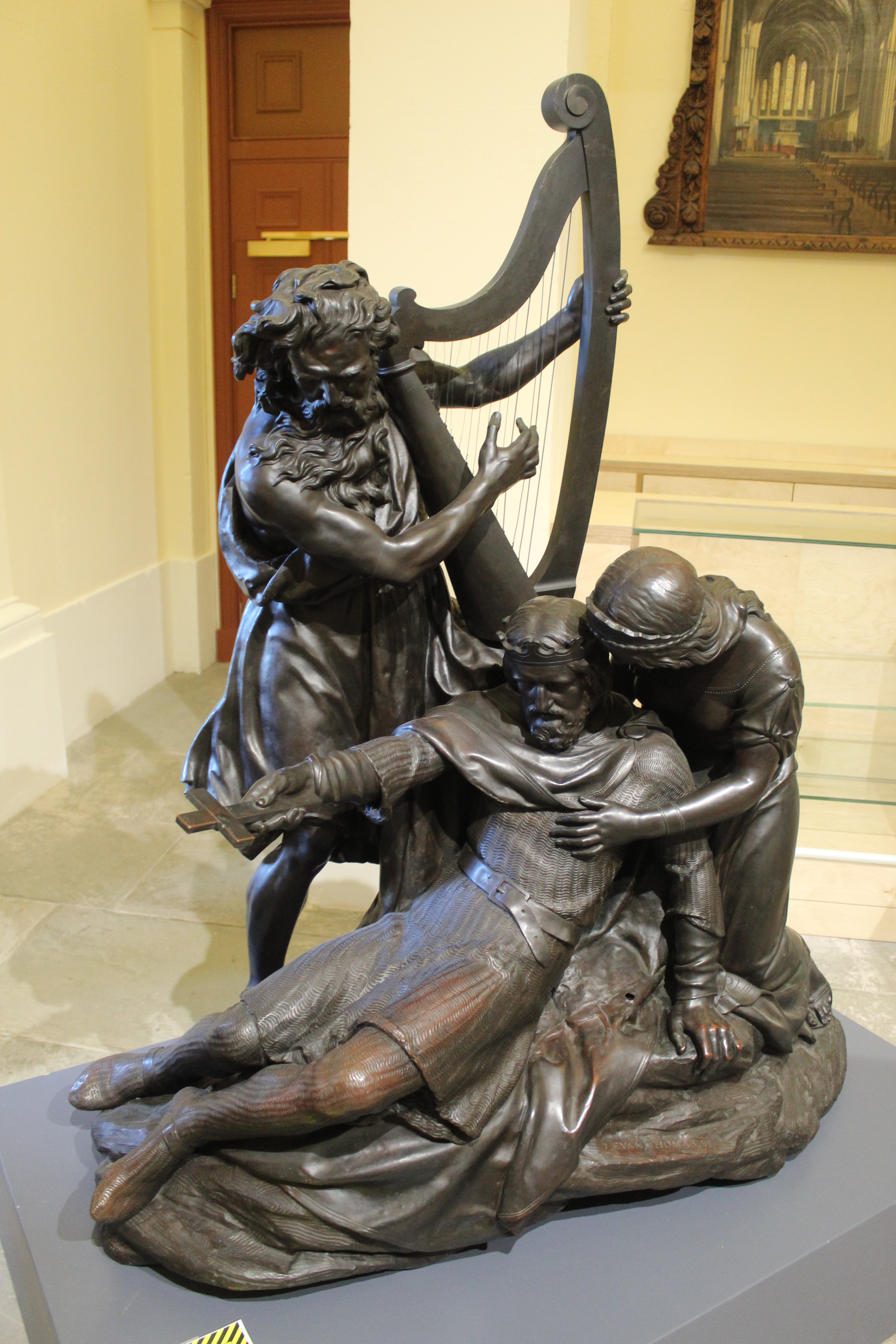
Death of Tewdrig

Thomas was born in Brecon, Wales the son of John Thomas of Castle Street in that town, and his wife Jane Evans of Aberedw in Radnor, in 1810.

In 1857 he left his London practice and bought the small mansion, Penisha'r-Pentre, at Llanspyddid. He retained a studio in Pimlico in London. He was appointed High Sheriff of Brecknockshire in 1868. As a loyal Welshman, and with the support of Benjamin Hall, he was a prominent figure in the movement to stop misuse of endowments which had been given to Christ College, Brecon. He died on 9 October 1873 in London. He is buried on the eastern section of Brompton Cemetery, south of the main east-west path. Although the area has become very overgrown, the monument is distinctive.

== Professional life ==
Thomas studied in London under Francis Leggatt Chantrey and then in Europe. He produced church monuments in Wales from 1831, and portraits in London from 1834 onwards, becoming a frequent exhibitor of his portrait busts at the Royal Academy between 1835 and 1862. At his London studio at 7 Lower Belgrave Place he retained the patronage of Welsh landed gentry, producing bust portraits for them. Many of his public works are still visible in Wales: for example his Duke of Wellington in the centre of Brecon, and his statuary in Brecon Cathedral. He also produced a lot of work outside Wales. Over the years his name has suffered confusion with that of John Thomas (1813–1862) to the extent that the English sculptor's 1855 Boadicea was transported as one of John Evan Thomas' works from Birmingham to Brecknock Museum in 1981, and suffered damage en route and after arrival, before it was realised that the sculptor was the other John Thomas. Works at the Guildhall and Lloyds Bank at Bristol are probably those of John Thomas but are attributed to John Evan Thomas.

== Works ==
=== Principal works ===
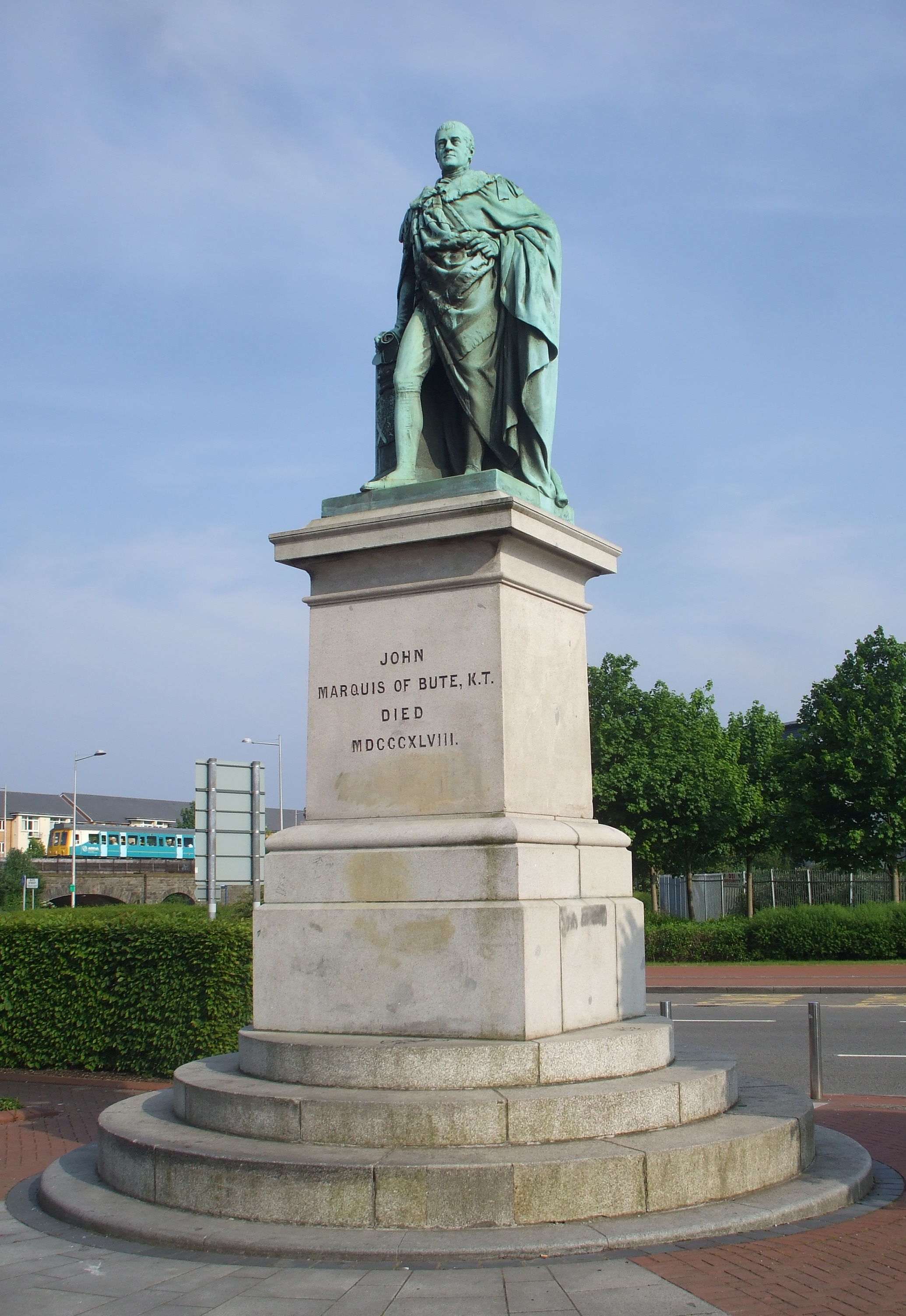
Second Marquess of Bute, 1853, in Callaghan Square, Cardiff

Two of his principal works are considered to be the Second Marquess of Londonderry at Westminster Abbey and the Second Marquess of Bute in Cardiff city centre. The latter was shown at the Great Exhibition of 1851 (originally in marble) and cast in bronze in 1853. Four more principal works are: Sir Charles Morgan at Newport, the Duke of Wellington at Brecon, the John Henry Vivian at Swansea and the 1865 Prince Consort on Castle Heights, Tenby.

=== Death of Tewdrig ===
In Y Gaer, a metal electrotype of his 1848 plaster sculpture, Death of Tewdrig, depicts the dying fifth-century king Tewdrig and saint of Glamorgan. It was designed by Thomas and modelled by his brother W. Meredyth Thomas in response to a patriotic competition at the 1848 Abergavenny Eisteddfod. This was shown again at the Royal Academy in 1849, and again as an electrotype at the Great Exhibition of 1851. This sculpture is associated with the Welsh national revival of the 1830s and 1840s.

=== House of Lords statuary and maquettes ===
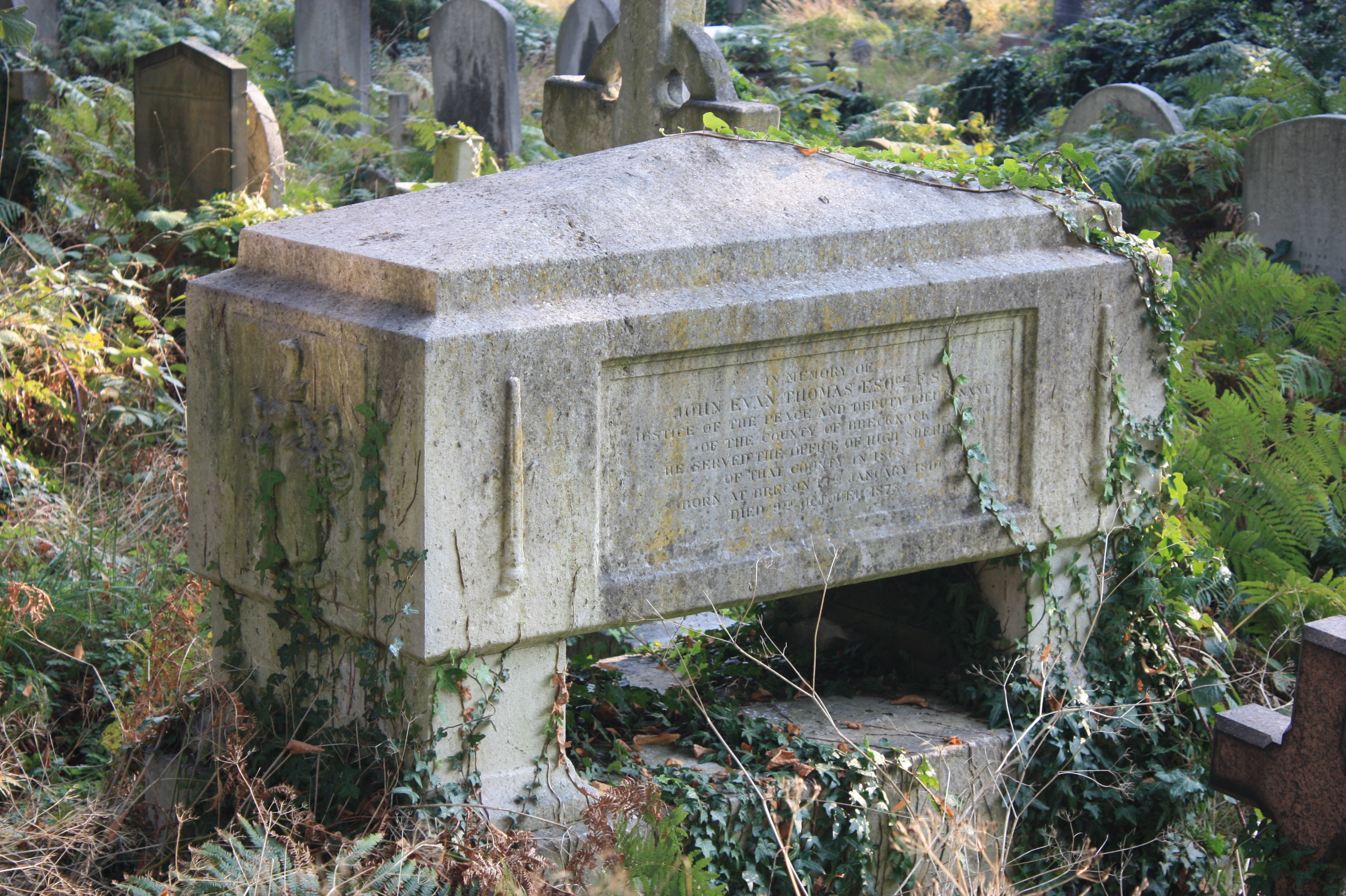
Thomas' grave, Brompton Cemetery, London

In 1844 Thomas exhibited a model of Lord Londonderry in Westminster Hall. In 1850 this was carved in marble and placed on permanent display in Westminster Abbey. Thomas produced two of the life-sized bronze statues, depicting the fifteen barons and two bishops who signed Magna Carta, which line the walls of the Lords' Chamber at the House of Lords and were cast in 1847–1851. The original maquettes for these have languished for a hundred years, hidden in the bottom of the north tower of the medieval Westgate, Canterbury. The statues which make up Thomas' contribution to this set are Henry de Loundres, Archbishop of Dublin, and William, Earl of Pembroke.
