= 1890 Cardiff County Borough Council election =

Local election in Cardiff, Wales

The 1890 Cardiff County Borough Council election was held on Saturday 1 November 1890 to elect councillors to Cardiff County Borough Council in Cardiff, Wales. These were the second all-Cardiff elections since the creation of the county borough. They were first to take place since the increase in number of electoral wards from four to ten.

== Background ==
Cardiff had become a county borough on 1 April 1889 as a result of the Local Government Act 1888. With its municipal year running from November, the November 1889 elections were the first all-Cardiff elections in the town since becoming a county borough. In July 1890 the town's ward boundaries were redrawn, increasing the number of electoral wards from five to ten. On 25 July the General Purposes Committee of the council had redistributed the existing councillors over the ten wards.

The November 1890 elections were the second all-Cardiff elections in the county borough. Not all council seats were up for election, because councillors stood down for election in three-yearly rotation. The next all-Cardiff election took place in November 1891.

The council consisted of 30 councillors who were elected by the town's voters and ten aldermen who were elected by the councillors.

== Overview of the result ==
Contests took place in all ten electoral wards, namely Adamsdown, Canton, Cathays, Central, Grangetown, Park, Riverside, Roath, South and Splott. One council seat was up for election in all wards except for Riverside, where two seats were up for election because of the recent death of a sitting councillor. Prior to the election, seven of the eleven seats were held by the Liberal Party and four by the Conservatives. The election resulted in the Liberals increasing their overall representation by one. The Liberals received 6,518 votes in comparison with 5,535 for the Conservative candidates.

Notable defeats included Sir Morgan Morgan in the Park ward, who lost to the Liberal candidate by 98 votes.

=== Council composition ===
Following these elections, the council's Liberal majority increased by two, with 25 Liberal members and 15 Conservatives.

== Ward results ==
=== Adamsdown ===
Adamsdown ward 1890
Party	Candidate	Votes	%	±%
Liberal	Edward Thomas *	727		
Conservative	L. S. Bickley	287		
Liberal hold		Swing		

=== Canton ===
Canton ward 1890
Party	Candidate	Votes	%	±%
Liberal	W. E. Vaughan *	548		
Conservative	H. Butler	382		
Liberal hold		Swing		

=== Cathays ===
Cathays ward 1890
Party	Candidate	Votes	%	±%
Liberal	Peter Price *	621		
Conservative	H. White	561		
Independent Labour	A. Good	262		
Liberal hold		Swing		

=== Central ===
Central ward 1890
Party	Candidate	Votes	%	±%
Conservative	Walter Raleigh Parker	617		
Liberal	J. Guy Proger *	615		
Conservative gain from Liberal		Swing		

Mr Proger had represented the ward for the previous 12 years.

=== Grangetown ===
Grangetown ward 1890
Party	Candidate	Votes	%	±%
Lib-Lab	John Jenkins	484		
Conservative	Robert Upham	260		

John Jenkins, a shipwright and a nominee of Cardiff Trades Council, was declared to be the first genuine working man's representative elected to the council.

=== Park ===
Cathays ward 1890
Party	Candidate	Votes	%	±%
Liberal	Charles Shepherd	747		
Conservative	Sir Morgan Morgan *	649		
Independent	Rees Enoch	36		
Liberal gain from Conservative		Swing		

Despite trailing by 100 votes after the first count, Sir Morgan Morgan's supporters demanded two recounts before conceding defeat.

=== Riverside (two seats) ===
Riverside ward (1) 1890
Party	Candidate	Votes	%	±%
Liberal	Dr James	638		
Conservative	R. Price *	615		
Liberal gain from Conservative		Swing		

An election was held on the same date, for the seat of Conservative councillor Smith, who had recently died.

Riverside ward (2) 1890
Party	Candidate	Votes	%	±%
Liberal	Noah Rees	635		
Conservative	Mr Evans	605		
Liberal gain from Conservative		Swing		

=== Roath ===
Roath ward 1890
Party	Candidate	Votes	%	±%
Conservative	W. J. Trounce *	746		
Liberal	J. Sully Stowe	378		
Conservative hold		Swing		

=== South ===
South ward 1890
Party	Candidate	Votes	%	±%
Conservative	J. H. Cory	512		
Liberal	F. J. Beavan *	456		
Conservative gain from Liberal		Swing		

=== Splott ===
Splott ward 1890
Party	Candidate	Votes	%	±%
Liberal	Thomas Andrews	397		
Conservative	Charles Jenkins	301		

* = 'retiring' ward councillor for re-election
