= Williamstown, Rhondda Cynon Taf =

Coordinates: 51.606989°N 3.441819°W

Williamstown: Welsh: Trewiliam
- Location within Rhondda Cynon Taf
- OS grid reference: ST002907
- Principal area: Rhondda Cynon Taf
- Preserved county: Mid Glamorgan
- Country: Wales
- Sovereign state: United Kingdom
- Post town: TONYPANDY
- Postcode district: CF40
- Dialling code: 01443
- Police: South Wales
- Fire: South Wales
- Ambulance: Welsh
- UK Parliament: Rhondda and Ogmore
- Senedd Cymru – Welsh Parliament: Afan Ogwr Rhondda

Williamstown (Welsh: Trewiliam) is a village in the Rhondda Valley in the county borough of Rhondda Cynon Taf, within the historic county boundaries of Glamorgan, Wales. Williamstown was founded in the 1870s, is located at the foot of Mynydd Dinas and is a district of neighbouring village Penygraig.

== Early history ==
Before the Rhondda was industrialised in the mid to late 19th century, the area where Williamstown now resides, was made up of woodlands occupied by sparsely populated farmlands. The area which would become Williamstown was called Hendre Gwilym and that name was later reduced to a street name within Williamstown. Williamstown exhibits very little evidence of early habitation, a few Bronze Age cairns have been discovered on Mynydd Dinas, but most hafodi and farm houses tended to group around the River Rhondda located lower down the valley.

Much of the land in the Rhondda, once controlled by individual farmers, had been bought up by wealthy absentee landlords by the start of the 19th century. The land which would become Williamstown was bought by Walter Coffin, the pioneer of coal mining in the Rhondda, around the 1850s. In 1867 this land was inherited by the Williams family, through their father, a cousin of Coffin. The Williams family gave their name to the town that was built on their land and among the trustees of the family was Caroline Elizabeth Williams, Arthur John Williams and Morgan Bransby Williams.
