= 1889 Cardiff County Borough Council election =

Local election in Cardiff, Wales

The 1889 Cardiff County Borough Council election was held on Friday 1 November 1889 to elect councillors to Cardiff County Borough Council in Cardiff, Wales. These were the first all-Cardiff elections since the creation of the county borough. The previous full elections were to Cardiff Town Council in November 1888.

== Background ==
Cardiff had become a county borough on 1 April 1889 as a result of the Local Government Act 1888. With its municipal year running from November, the November 1889 elections were the first all-Cardiff elections in the town since becoming a county borough. Not all council seats were up for election, because councillors stood down for election in rotation. The next all-Cardiff election took place on 1 November 1890.

In 1889 the council consisted of 30 councillors who were elected by the town's voters and ten aldermen who were elected by the councillors.

== Overview of the result ==
Contests took place in only two wards, the West ward and the Canton ward, which both elected two councillors. There were contrasting results in these wards, which the South Wales Daily News put down largely to the winning side being better organised, generally with more vehicles available to carry voters to the polling stations. In the West ward, Conservative candidate Mr E.J. Smith was president of the local Lincensed Victuallers Association, so secured the support of every publican.

The correspondent in the South Wales Daily News points to the recent South ward by-election, which had happened only five weeks beforehand and should have been a warning to the Liberals in the November election. The South ward by-election took place on 23 September in the docks area of the town and had been won by the Conservative candidate, their first representation in the ward since before 1886.

== Ward results ==
=== Canton ===
Canton ward 1889
Party	Candidate	Votes	%	±%
Liberal	Mr S. Mildon *	1,345		
Liberal	Mr W. Sanders *	1,272		
Independent	Mr H. Butler	837		
Liberal hold		Swing		
Liberal hold		Swing		

=== West ===
West ward 1889
Party	Candidate	Votes	%	±%
Conservative	Mr W. C Hurley	732		
Conservative	Mr E. J. Smith	700		
Liberal	Mr Joseph Henry Jones *	652		
Liberal	Mr E. Thomas	594		
Conservative hold		Swing		
Conservative gain from Liberal		Swing		

* = 'retiring' ward councillor for re-election
