= Horace Jones (architect) =

English architect (1819–1887)

Sir Horace Jones
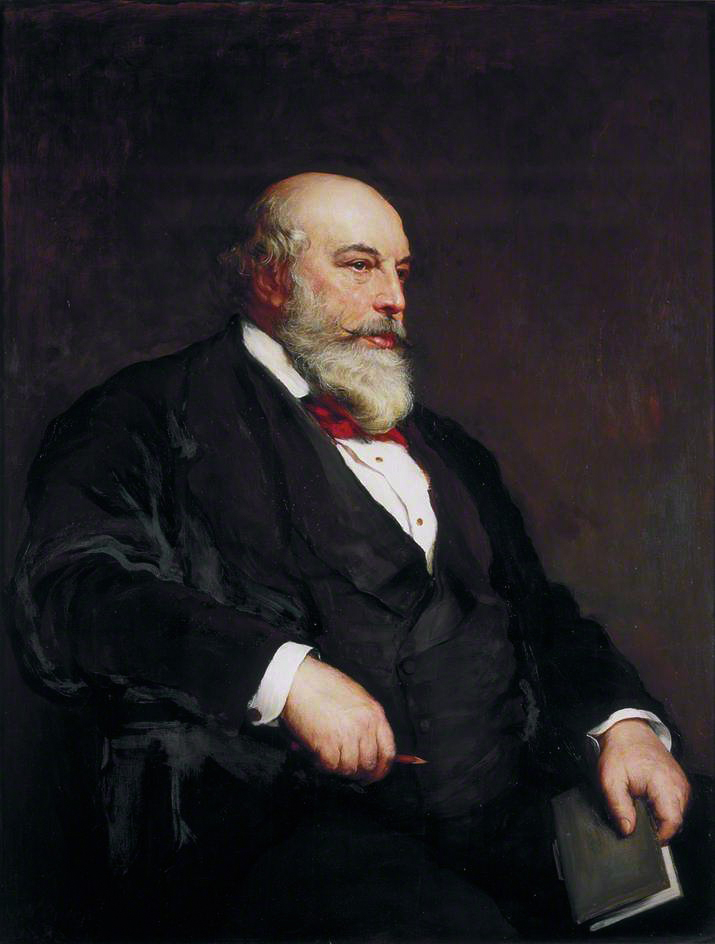
- Portrait by Walter William Ouless, 1886
- Born: 20 May 1819; Bucklersbury, London
- Died: 21 May 1887 (aged 68); London
- Resting place: West Norwood Cemetery
- Spouse: Ann Elizabeth Patch (1839 - 1889)
- Children: Annie Horatia Jones (1876 - 1969)

Sir Horace Jones (20 May 1819 – 21 May 1887) was an English architect particularly noted for his work for the City of London from 1864 until his death. He served as president of the Royal Institute of British Architects from 1882 until 1884, and was knighted in 1886. His most recognised work, Tower Bridge, was completed posthumously. Although his work is widely recognised, Jones himself is relatively little known, and is often disparaged by the architectural profession because of a perceived lack of artistry.

== Biography ==
The son of David Jones, a lawyer, and Sarah Lydia Shephard, Jones was born at 15 Size Lane, Bucklersbury, London. He was articled to John Wallen, an architect and surveyor, of 16 Aldermanbury, and subsequently in 1841–42 travelled to Italy and Greece studying ancient architecture.

In 1843 he commenced practice as an architect at 16 Furnival's Inn, Holborn. Beginning with Cardiff Town Hall (c. 1850–53) and Caversham Park (from c. 1850), he designed and carried out many important buildings, soon coming to concentrate on work in London. He was surveyor for the Duke of Buckingham's Tufnell Park estate, for the Barnard estate, and the Bethnal Green estate.

On 26 February 1864 he was elected architect and surveyor to the City of London, succeeding James Bunstone Bunning. Jones completed projects begun by his predecessor, such as the City Lunatic Asylum at Dartford, and was in charge of several renovations and additions to the Guildhall. He designed and built some of London's most famous markets, in particular Smithfield, Billingsgate and Leadenhall. He also designed the memorial at Temple Bar, replacing Wren's arch which was a notorious traffic obstacle. Jones also claimed that the chosen design for Holborn Viaduct was his, though he later lost a piracy case against William Haywood, Engineer to the City of London, who is now credited with the work.

Jones' final legacy is one of the most recognised buildings in the world, Tower Bridge. It was designed in collaboration with the civil engineer John Wolfe Barry, who was brought in as an expert to devise the mechanism for the bascule bridge. Following Jones' death during the initial stages of construction, the execution lay in the hands of Barry.

Jones became an associate of the Royal Institute of British Architects in 1842, a fellow in 1855. Despite his prominence in the profession, he was voted down for the Presidency in 1881 on the grounds that his work did not show sufficient artistry, and that he was a local authority employee rather than an independent practitioner. Jones protested strongly and was elected President at the next election in 1882. He was knighted on 30 July 1886. Jones was also a freemason, and from 1882 until his death was Grand Superintendent of Works in which capacity he oversaw the rebuilding of the Freemasons Hall in Covent Garden after it was destroyed by fire in 1883.

Jones married Ann Elizabeth Patch, the daughter of John Patch, a barrister, on 15 April 1875 and had one daughter, Annie Horatia (1876-1969). He died at 30 Devonshire Place, Portland Place, London, on 21 May 1887, and was buried in West Norwood Cemetery on 27 May. A portrait of Jones by Walter William Ouless RA was exhibited at the Royal Academy Exhibition in 1887.

== Works ==
All in London unless otherwise stated.

=== Destroyed ===
- Cardiff Town Hall, c. 1850–53, demolished 1913.
- Marshall & Snelgrove's department store, Oxford Street, 1850s.
- Surrey Music Hall, Newington, 1856.
- Sovereign Life Assurance offices, Piccadilly, 1857.
- British and Irish Magnetic Telegraph Company's office, Threadneedle Street, 1859. A contemporary account refers to the building's "rather fanciful, and very ornate French Renaissance facade, crowned by a lofty clock-tower."
- Council Chamber, Guildhall, 1884.
- Bishopsgate Police Station, 1866, demolished 1930s

=== Extant ===
- Caversham Park, Oxfordshire, c. 1850 (now within the borough of Reading, Berkshire).
- The Hurd Estate: five remaining "gentlemen's houses" of a development in Kentish Town, North London, c.1855.
- Smithfield Market. Built in three stages: Central Meat Market, 1866–67; Poultry and Provision Market, 1873–75 (burnt 1958); Fruit and Vegetable Market, 1879–83.
- Foreign Cattle Market, 1871. Conversion of Convoys Wharf, Deptford.
- Library and Museum, Guildhall, 1872 (now fulfilling different functions).
- Billingsgate Market, 1874-78 (1985-89 converted into offices by Richard Rogers).
- Temple Bar Memorial, 1880. The elaborate pedestal in a Neo-Renaissance style, decorated with some reliefs as well as statues of Queen Victoria and The Prince of Wales, serves as the base for Charles Bell Birch's Griffin (but really a dragon), the symbol of the City of London.
- Leadenhall Market, 1880–81.
- former Guildhall School of Music and Drama, John Carpenter Street, completed in 1886.
- Tower Bridge, approved design 1884, construction by John Wolfe Barry 1886–94. Jones' stonework in the Baronial Style, supposed to be in harmony with the nearby Tower of London, is pure facade which disguises the metal structure underneath.

== Gallery ==
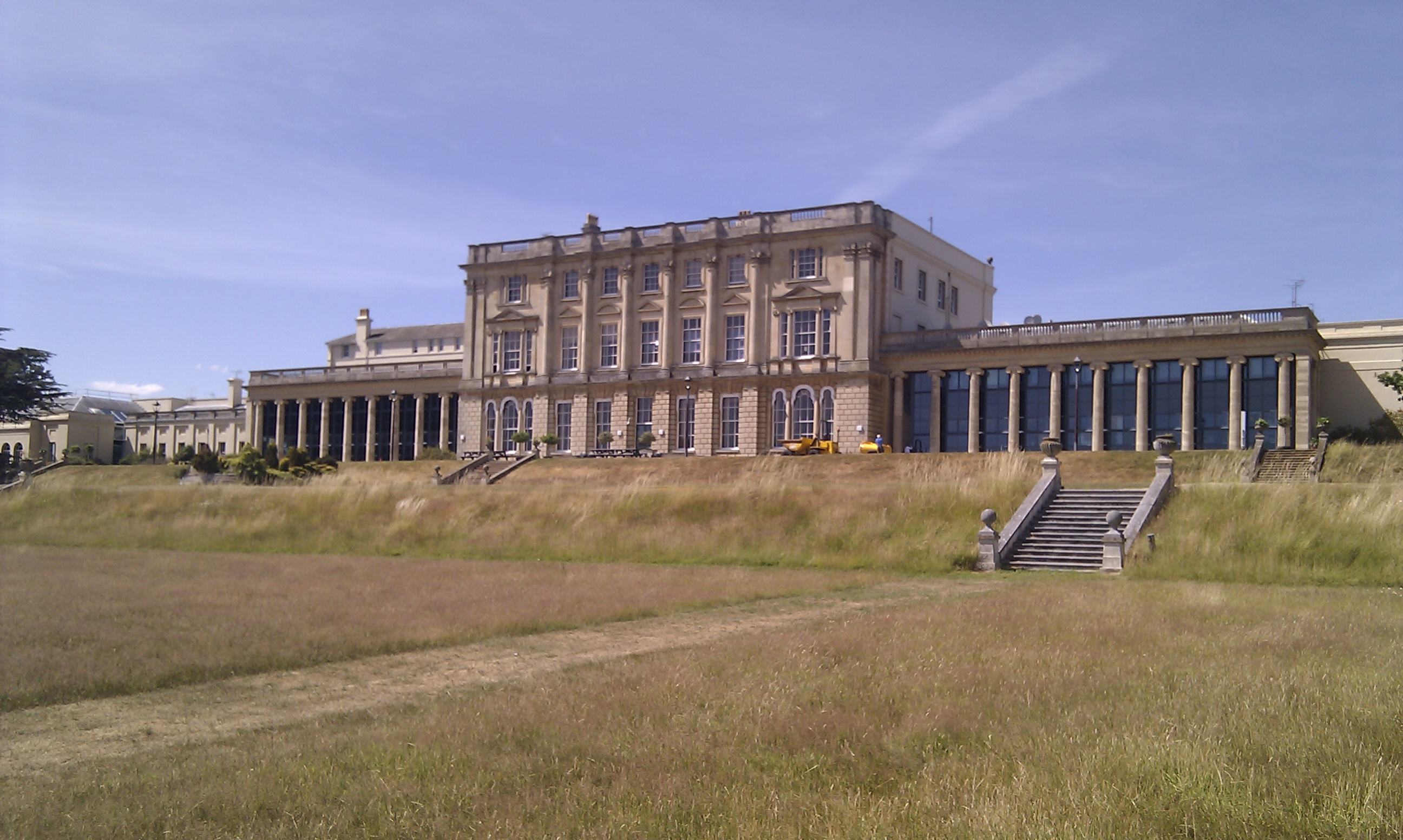
Caversham Park

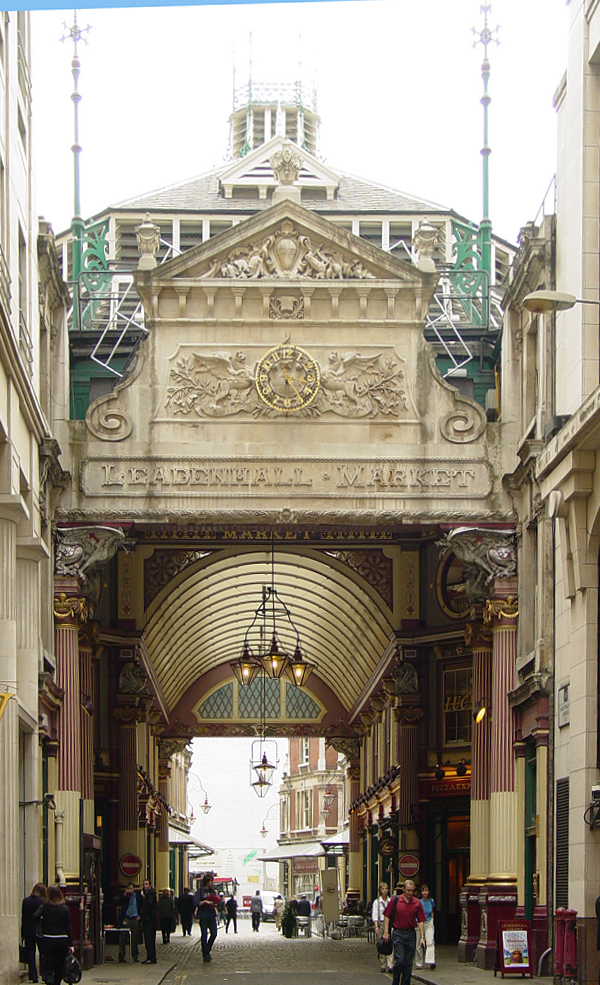
Leadenhall Market

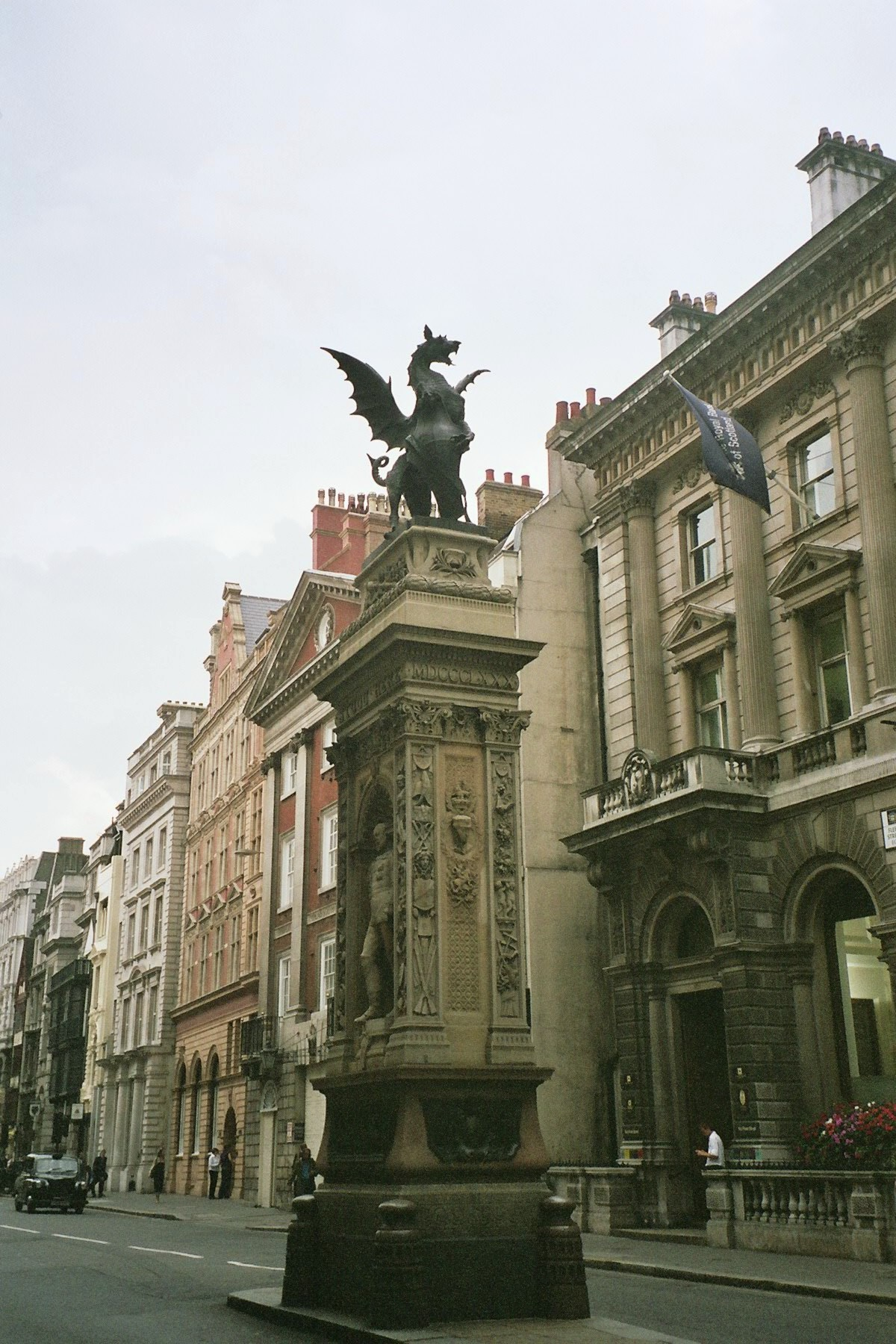
Temple Bar Memorial

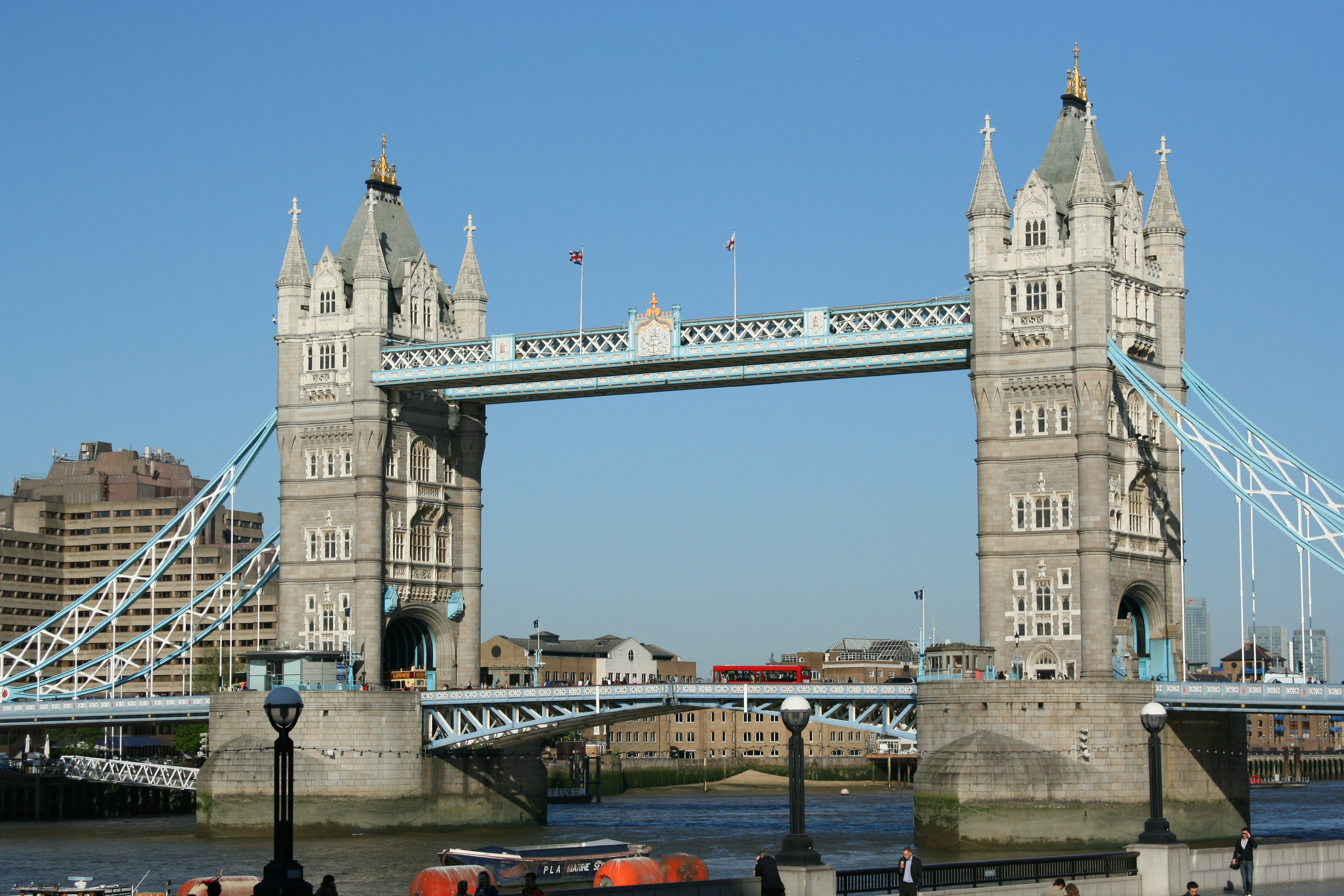
Tower Bridge

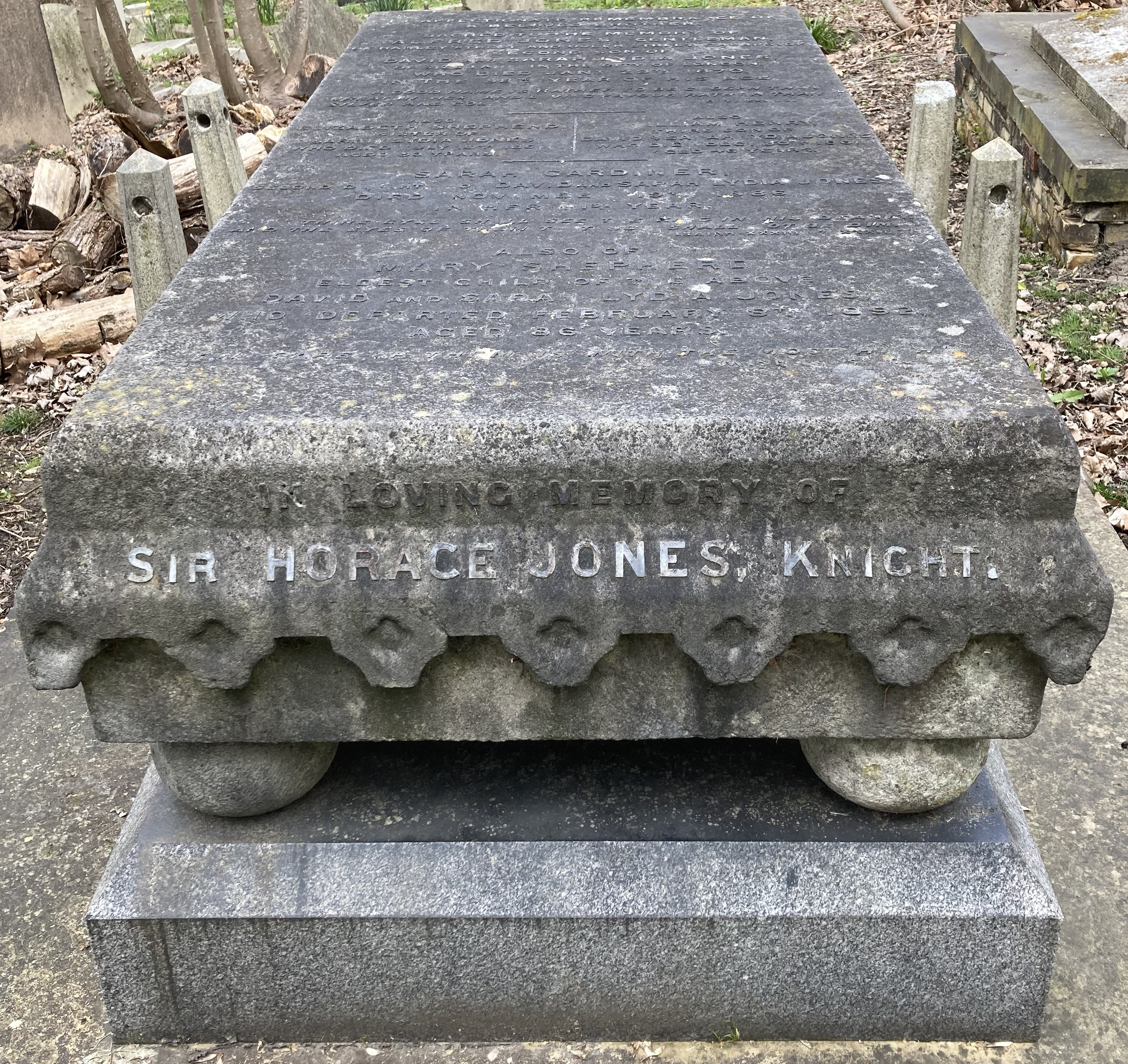
Grave of Sir Horace Jones in West Norwood Cemetery

== Sources ==
- This article incorporates text from a publication now in the public domain: "Jones, Horace". Dictionary of National Biography. London: Smith, Elder & Co. 1885–1900.
- Lascelles, David. Horace Jones, Architect of Tower Bridge. Profile Editions, 2024. ISBN 9781800819504.
