= 1891 Cardiff County Borough Council election =

Local election in Cardiff, Wales

The 1891 Cardiff County Borough Council election was held on Monday 2 November 1891 to elect councillors to Cardiff County Borough Council in Cardiff, Wales. These were the third all-Cardiff elections since the creation of the county borough. The previous elections were in November 1890 and the next elections were in November 1892

The result of the election saw no overall change in composition of the council.

== Background ==
Cardiff had become a county borough in April 1889. In July 1890 the town's ward boundaries were redrawn, increasing the number of electoral wards from five to ten. On 25 July the General Purposes Committee of the council had redistributed the existing councillors over the ten wards. Not all council seats were included in each contest, because the three councillors in each ward stood down for election in three-yearly rotation.

Elections normally took place on 1 November each year. Because 1 November 1891 fell on a Sunday, the 1891 elections took place on 2 November.

The council consisted of 30 councillors who were elected by the town's voters and ten aldermen who were elected by the councillors. Ten seats were up for election in November 1891.

== Overview of the result ==
Contests took place in seven of the ten electoral wards, namely Canton, Cathays, Central, Grangetown, Riverside, Roath and South. In three wards - Adamsdown, Park and Splott - the (Liberal) councillors were elected unopposed.

Prior to the election, three of the seven contested seats were held by the Liberal Party and four by the Conservatives. This remained the case after the results were announced. In comparison with 1890, the Liberals had an overall increase in votes of 299, in comparison with 127 for the Conservatives.

The Conservatives concentrated their campaigning in the Central and South wards, though in the South ward the retiring Conservative councillor only won by one vote.

=== Council composition ===
Following these elections, the council's Liberal majority remained, with 26 Liberal members, 13 Conservatives and one Liberal Unionist.

== Ward results ==
=== Adamsdown ===
Adamsdown ward 1891
Party	Candidate	Votes	%	±%
Liberal	James Munn	Unopposed		
Liberal hold		Swing		

=== Canton ===
Canton ward 1891
Party	Candidate	Votes	%	±%
Liberal	William Lewis *	592		
Conservative	R. Worthy Blake	503		
Liberal hold		Swing		

=== Cathays ===
Cathays ward 1891
Party	Candidate	Votes	%	±%
Conservative	Henry White	569		
Liberal	Charles Merrett	511		
Labour	Alfred Good	306		
Liberal hold		Swing		

=== Central ===
Central ward 1891
Party	Candidate	Votes	%	±%
Conservative	W. Evans	627		
Liberal	F. H. Jotham *	623		
Conservative gain from Liberal		Swing		

=== Grangetown ===
Grangetown ward 1891
Party	Candidate	Votes	%	±%
Conservative	Samuel A. Brain *	544		
Lib-Lab	John Gardner	286		
Conservative hold		Swing		

Fireworks were let off after the result was announced, celebrating Brain's re-election.

=== Park ===
Park ward 1891
Party	Candidate	Votes	%	±%
Liberal	Ebenezer Beavan *	Unopposed		
Liberal hold		Swing		

=== Riverside ===
Riverside ward 1891
Party	Candidate	Votes	%	±%
Liberal	Frank J. Beavan	767		
Conservative	Dr Morgan Williams	459		
Liberal gain from Conservative		Swing		

Beavan had previously lost his council seat in the South ward in November 1890.

=== Roath ===
Roath ward 1891
Party	Candidate	Votes	%	±%
Liberal	Augustus Lewis	625		
Conservative	Mr Waring	510		
Liberal gain from Conservative		Swing		

=== South ===
South ward 1891
Party	Candidate	Votes	%	±%
Conservative	Thomas Morel *	529		
Liberal	Dr Alfred Rees	528		
Conservative hold		Swing		

Morel, a ship owner, had been the sitting councillor for six years. There was more than one recount and the results were not announced until 10 p.m. The winning candidate was not present at the count, being ill with pleurisy.

=== Splott ===
Splott ward 1891
Party	Candidate	Votes	%	±%
Liberal	Jacob Comley	Unopposed		
Liberal hold		Swing		

* = 'retiring' ward councillor for re-election
