= Arthur John Williams =

Welsh writer and politician

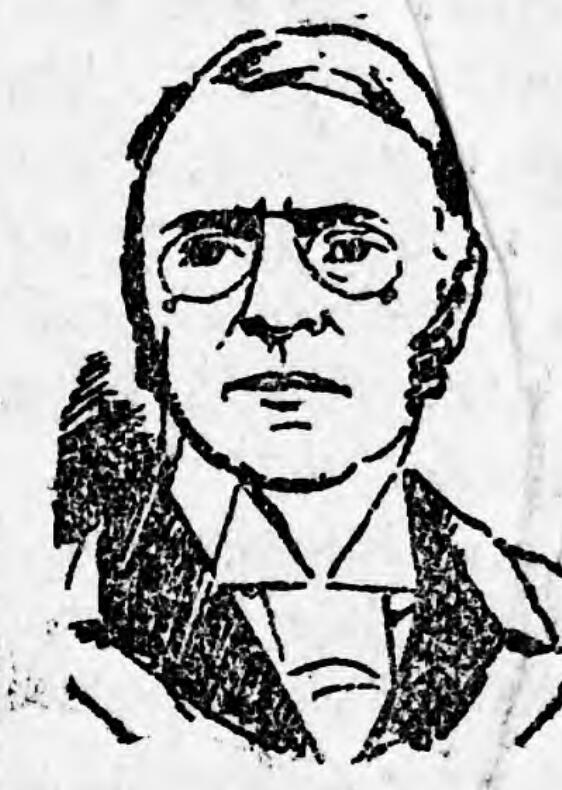
Williams in 1895

Arthur John Williams (14 April 1834 – 12 September 1911) was a Welsh lawyer, author and member of parliament for South Glamorganshire 1885–1895.

Williams was born in 1834 to Dr John Morgan Williams. Arthur John Williams was one of the trustees of the land that the village of Williamstown was built upon and that took his family name. Privately educated, Williams studied law and was called to the Bar at the Inner Temple in 1867. Williams served as an honorary secretary to the Law society and the Legal Education Association.

His first foray into politics occurred in 1880 when he unsuccessfully contested the seat of Birkenhead. In 1885 he was elected as a Liberal member of South Glamorgan and held the seat until 1895. He campaigned for proportional representation and the abolition of hereditary peers in the House of Lords. Along with David Lloyd George, he campaigned for the disestablishment of the Church of England in Wales.

== Published works ==
- The Appropriation of the Railways by the State London (1868)

Parliament of the United Kingdom
Preceded by (new constituency)	Member of Parliament for South Glamorganshire; 1885–1895	Succeeded by Windham Wyndham-Quin
