= Callaghan Square =

Public square in Cardiff, Wales

Coordinates: 51.4753°N 3.1740°W

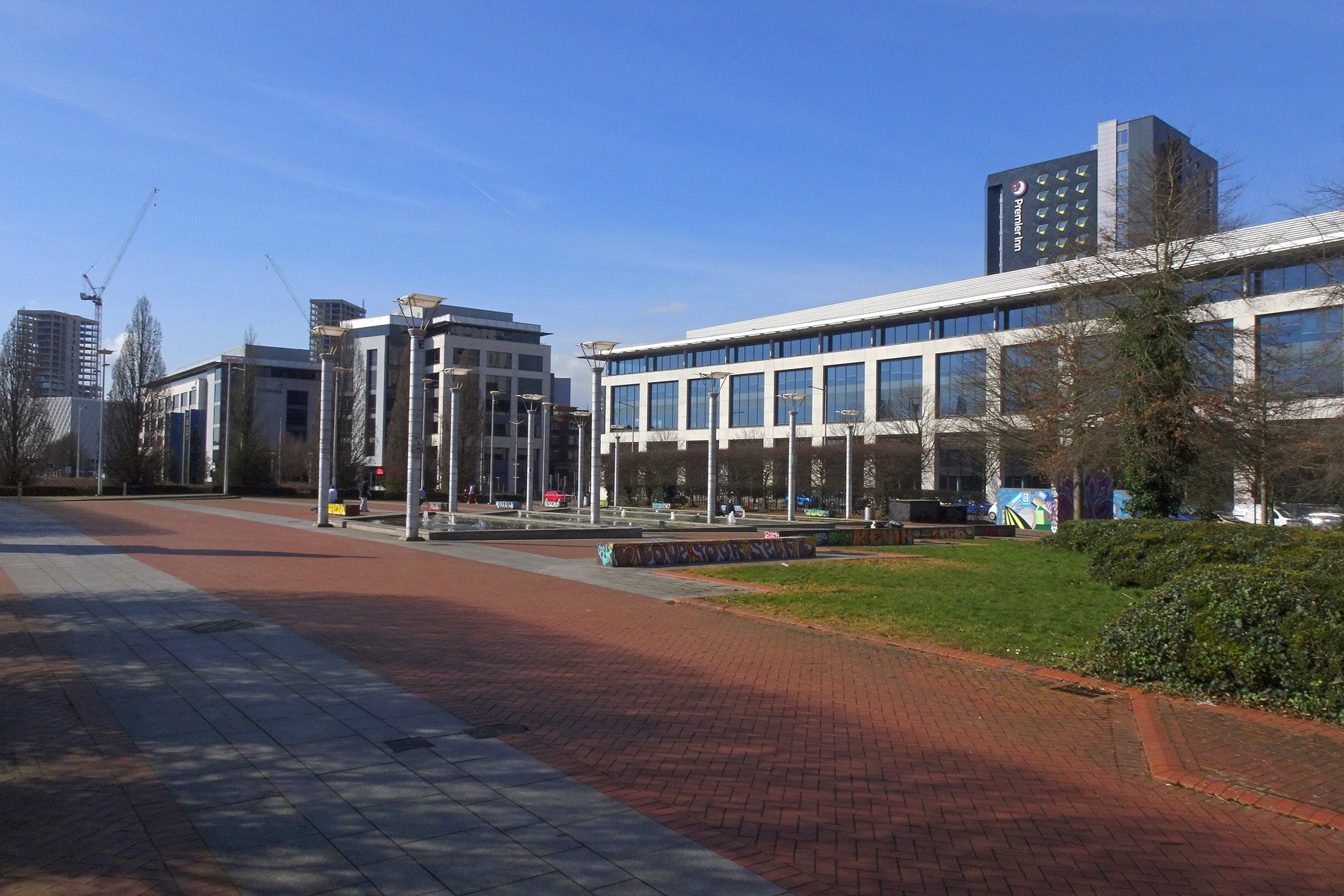
Callaghan Square, March 2025

Callaghan Square (Welsh: Sgwâr Callaghan) is a large public plaza in Cardiff, Wales, previously known as Bute Square. It was developed as part of a Private Finance Initiative (PFI) scheme to link central Cardiff with Cardiff Bay.

== History ==
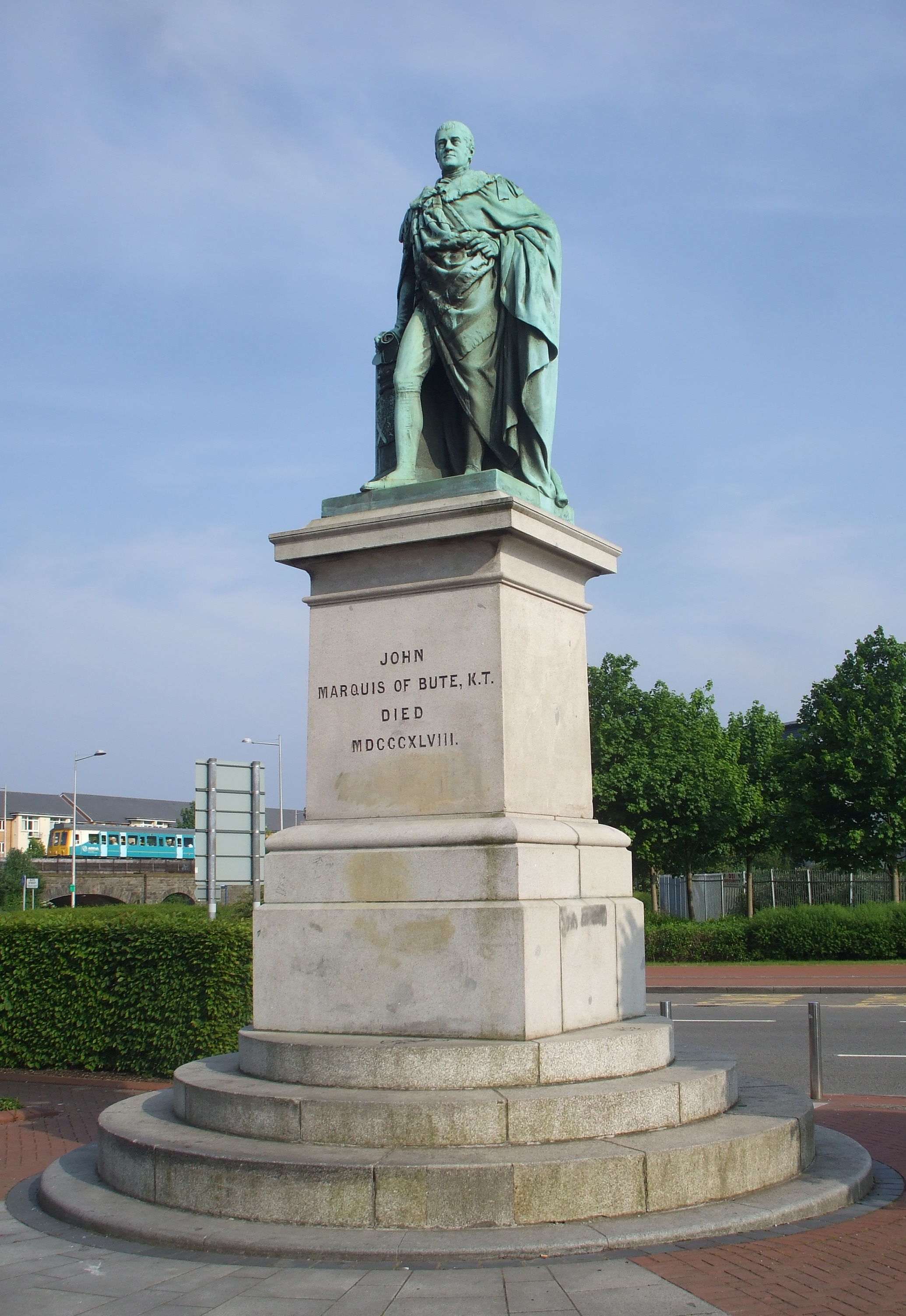
Statue of the 2nd Marquess of Bute in Callaghan Square

Cardiff Bay was developed in the 1990s. A new public square and new link road, Lloyd George Avenue, were conceived by the Cardiff Bay Development Corporation (CBDC), using a PFI scheme that will cost taxpayers £189 million over 25 years. There was a commitment to provide at least 356,000 sq ft of commercial office space. Initial stages were completed by October 2000 (when Lloyd George Avenue was officially opened). When CBDC was wound up in 2000 the project became the responsibility of the Welsh Development Agency.

Initially named Bute Square, in 1998 the development had been considered as a location for the new home of the Senedd. It was rejected because of the risks associated with a complex PFI scheme. There were also concerns the site would be too small and dominated by traffic. In March 2000, there was a three-month suspension and review of the project, in which Bute Square was one of three alternative locations considered; the preferred location continued to be in Cardiff Bay next to the Pierhead Building, which became the Senedd building.

A statue of the John Crichton-Stuart, 2nd Marquess of Bute was relocated to Bute Square in 2000. The statue was originally created in 1853 and stood in front of the old town hall.

A new commercial office scheme was also developed on the square by property company MEPC. The first phase, a 145,000 sq ft office building completed by 2002, was named No 1 Bute Square.

On 1 June 2002 Bute Square was renamed Callaghan Square in honour of former UK Prime Minister (and Cardiff South and Penarth MP) Lord Callaghan.

== Future developments ==
In January 2011 it was announced that Callaghan Square could become the site for a new convention centre. In March 2011 a report revealed plans to re-route the roads and junctions surrounding the square, possibly replacing the Herbert Street railway bridge, removing the road to the north of the square and adding a dedicated bus lane. The work was expected to start within 12–18 months.

=== Metro station ===
In summer 2024, Transport for Wales announced that as part of the ongoing Cardiff Crossrail project, a new Metro station will be constructed at Callaghan Square, which is estimated to open in 2028. It is currently assumed that metro trains will serve the station at a frequency of every 10 minutes north to Radyr and the South Wales Valleys, and south to Cardiff Bay, with frequencies eventually being increased once the full project is completed with new services added to Cardiff Parkway and Creigiau.
