= South Glamorganshire (UK Parliament constituency) =

UK Parliament constituency (1885–1918)

- Former county constituency for the House of Commons

1885–1918
- Seats: one
- Created from: Glamorganshire
- Replaced by: Llandaff and Barry, Ogmore and Pontypridd

South Glamorganshire was a parliamentary constituency in Glamorganshire, Wales. It returned one Member of Parliament (MP) to the House of Commons of the Parliament of the United Kingdom, elected by the first past the post system.

== Overview ==
The constituency was created by the Redistribution of Seats Act 1885 for the 1885 general election. Of all the Glamorgan seats created by the 1885 redistribution, South Glamorgan was the only one where the Liberal Party could not be assured of victory. The Bute and Dunraven families exercised a powerful influence. The mining areas in the north of the constituency, including the lower reaches of the Rhondda, and the cosmopolitan town of Barry were strongly Liberal but these were juxtaposed against the conservatism of the Vale of Glamorgan and the genteel settlements of Penarth and Llandaff.

The constituency was abolished for the 1918 general election.

== Boundaries ==
Created in the redistribution of seats in 1885 from the old Glamorganshire constituency which had been in existence since 1541, the seat covered a wide area that included Bridgend, Porthcawl, Coity, Ewenny, Ogmore, Llanharry, Llanharan, Llantwit Major, Dinas Powis, Pendoylan, Bonvilston, Barry, Penarth, Tonyrefail, Pontyclun and Beddau, and areas which are now part of Cardiff (including St Fagans, Radyr, Whitchurch, Llanishen and Lisvane). Cowbridge and Llantrisant were excluded from South Glamorganshire, being contributory boroughs of Cardiff District of Boroughs constituency.

The constituency was scrapped in the next redistribution of seats that took place in 1918.

== Members of Parliament ==
Election	Member	Party
1885	Arthur Williams	Liberal
1895	Windham Wyndham-Quin	Conservative
1906	William Brace	Liberal
1909	William Brace	Labour
1918	constituency abolished	

== History ==
=== Major Wyndham-Quin ===
From 1885 until 1895 the seat was held by the Liberals but in 1895 it was captured by a Conservative landowner, who held the seat with a reduced majority in 1900.

=== William Brace ===
In 1903, South Glamorgan became the focus of an internal battle within the Liberal Party around whether a labour representative should become the candidate. Although the miners composed only a fifth of the electorate, the claims of William Brace, vice president of the South Wales Miners Federation were also championed by the dockworkers of Barry. Following the intervention of the Liberal Chief Whip, Brace was duly chosen and won the seat in 1906. He held it until its abolition in 1918.

== Elections ==
=== Elections in the 1880s ===
General election 1885: South Glamorganshire
Party	Candidate	Votes	%	±%
Liberal	Arthur John Williams	3,945	54.1	
Conservative	John Dillwyn-Llewelyn	3,351	45.9	
Majority		594	8.2	
Turnout		7,296	82.9	
Registered electors		8,806		
Liberal win (new seat)				

General election 1886: South Glamorganshire
Party	Candidate	Votes	%	±%
Liberal	Arthur John Williams	3,497	61.6	+7.5
Liberal Unionist	James Mowatt	2,177	38.4	−7.5
Majority		1,320	23.2	+15.0
Turnout		5,674	64.4	−18.5
Registered electors		8,806		
Liberal hold		Swing	+7.5	

=== Elections in the 1890s ===
General election 1892: South Glamorganshire
Party	Candidate	Votes	%	±%
Liberal	Arthur John Williams	4,743	55.4	−6.2
Conservative	Morgan Morgan	3,825	44.6	+6.2
Majority		918	10.8	−12.4
Turnout		8,568	68.6	+4.2
Registered electors		12,481		
Liberal hold		Swing	-6.2	

General election 1895: South Glamorganshire
Party	Candidate	Votes	%	±%
Conservative	Windham Wyndham-Quin	5,747	53.9	+9.3
Liberal	Arthur John Williams	4,922	46.1	−9.3
Majority		825	7.8	N/A
Turnout		10,669	75.0	+6.4
Registered electors		14,227		
Conservative gain from Liberal		Swing	+9.3	

=== Elections in the 1900s ===
General election 1900: South Glamorganshire
Party	Candidate	Votes	%	±%
Conservative	Windham Wyndham-Quin	6,841	52.0	−1.9
Liberal	Walter H. Morgan	6,322	48.0	+1.9
Majority		519	4.0	−3.8
Turnout		13,163	73.2	−1.8
Registered electors		17,979		
Conservative hold		Swing	−1.9	

Brace

General election 1906: South Glamorganshire
Party	Candidate	Votes	%	±%
Lib-Lab	William Brace	10,514	63.3	+15.3
Conservative	Windham Wyndham-Quin	6,096	36.7	−15.3
Majority		4,418	26.6	N/A
Turnout		16,610	80.9	+7.7
Registered electors		20,541		
Lib-Lab gain from Conservative		Swing	+15.3	

=== Elections in the 1910s ===
General election January 1910: South Glamorganshire
Party	Candidate	Votes	%	±%
Labour	William Brace	11,612	61.0	−2.3
Conservative	Lewis Morgan	7,411	39.0	+2.3
Majority		4,201	22.0	−4.6
Turnout		19,023	82.9	+2.0
Labour hold		Swing	+2.3	

General election December 1910: South Glamorganshire
Party	Candidate	Votes	%	±%
Labour	William Brace	10,190	58.4	−2.6
Conservative	Lewis Morgan	7,252	41.6	+2.6
Majority		2,938	16.8	−5.2
Turnout		17,442	76.0	−6.9
Labour hold		Swing	+2.6	

General Election 1914–15:

Another General Election was required to take place before the end of 1915. The political parties had been making preparations for an election to take place and by July 1914, the following candidates had been selected;

- Labour: William Brace
- Liberal Roland Philipps
- Unionist: Frank Gaskell

== See also ==
- A map of Glamorganshire in 1885, showing its new divisions.
- Boundary Commission Map Report from 1885 showing detailed original maps used
- The National Library for Wales: A Dictionary of Welsh Biography (Windham Henry Wyndham-Quin, 5th Earl Dunraven and Mount-Earl)
- The National Library for Wales: A Dictionary of Welsh Biography (William Brace)

== Sources ==
=== Books and Journals ===
- Morgan, Kenneth O. (1960). "Democratic Politics in Glamorgan, 1884-1914". Morgannwg. 4: 5–27.
- Morgan, Kenneth O (1991). Wales in British Politics 1868–1922 (3rd ed.). Cardiff: University of Wales Press. ISBN 0708311245.
