= Morgan Morgan (Welsh politician) =

Welsh politician (1843–1894)

Sir Morgan Morgan (1843–1894) was a solicitor who became mayor of Cardiff, Wales, in 1886. He was also Chief Magistrate of the town.

== Background ==
Morgan was born in north Carmarthenshire on 18 July 1843, to Morgan Morgan, a farmer of Cilycwm. He was brought up by his uncle, a banker in Brecon, with his brother John (who became High Sheriff of Brecknockshire and Mayor of Brecon). Morgan attended the Priory School in Abergavenny, followed by Christ College in Brecon. Choosing to become a solicitor, he was articled in Cardiff after moving there in 1861. He became a solicitor in 1866.

In 1874 Morgan married Elizabeth Margetta Buckley, daughter of James Buckley (later High Sheriff of Carmarthenshire).

== Legal career ==
Morgan practised as a solicitor in Cardiff, later going into partnership as Morgan and Scott, with Walter Scott who had been previously articled under him.

== Politics and public service ==
Morgan was first elected to Cardiff Borough Council in 1881, as a Conservative councillor for the East ward of the town. In November 1886 he was elected as Cardiff's Chief Magistrate.

In November 1886 Morgan also became Mayor of Cardiff for the next 12 months, which included the town's celebrations of Queen Victoria's Golden Jubilee. He also hosted a banquet for the Premier of Queensland, Sir Samuel Griffith. He granted the freedom of Cardiff to UK Prime Minister, William Gladstone.

In August 1887 Morgan was given a knighthood as part of the Golden Jubilee Honours and a garden party of 2,000 people was held in Sophia Gardens later that month. As a mark of gratitude for his services to the borough, in November 1888 the council presented Morgan with a 36 piece silver dinner set (worth £1,000) and two oil paintings of himself. Lady Morgan received a diamond bracelet.

Following the creation of Cardiff County Borough in 1889, Morgan became councillor for the new Park ward, but was the most prominent casualty of the all-Cardiff elections in November 1890, when he lost to the Liberal contender. Despite trailing by 100 votes, Morgan demanded a recount, eventually losing by 649 votes to 747.

Morgan stood unsuccessfully in the 1892 United Kingdom general election for the South Glamorganshire constituency.

== Death ==
Morgan died at his house in Cathedral Road, Cardiff, on 13 December 1894. He had fallen ill on a trip to Scotland in the September, then caught a further cold staying at his house in Porthcawl in late November. After his death was announced, the muffled bells of St John's church were rung and flags were flown at half mast on some of Cardiff's important buildings.
