= Statue of the Second Marquess of Bute =

Statue in Cardiff, Wales

Coordinates: 51.47521°N 3.17358°W

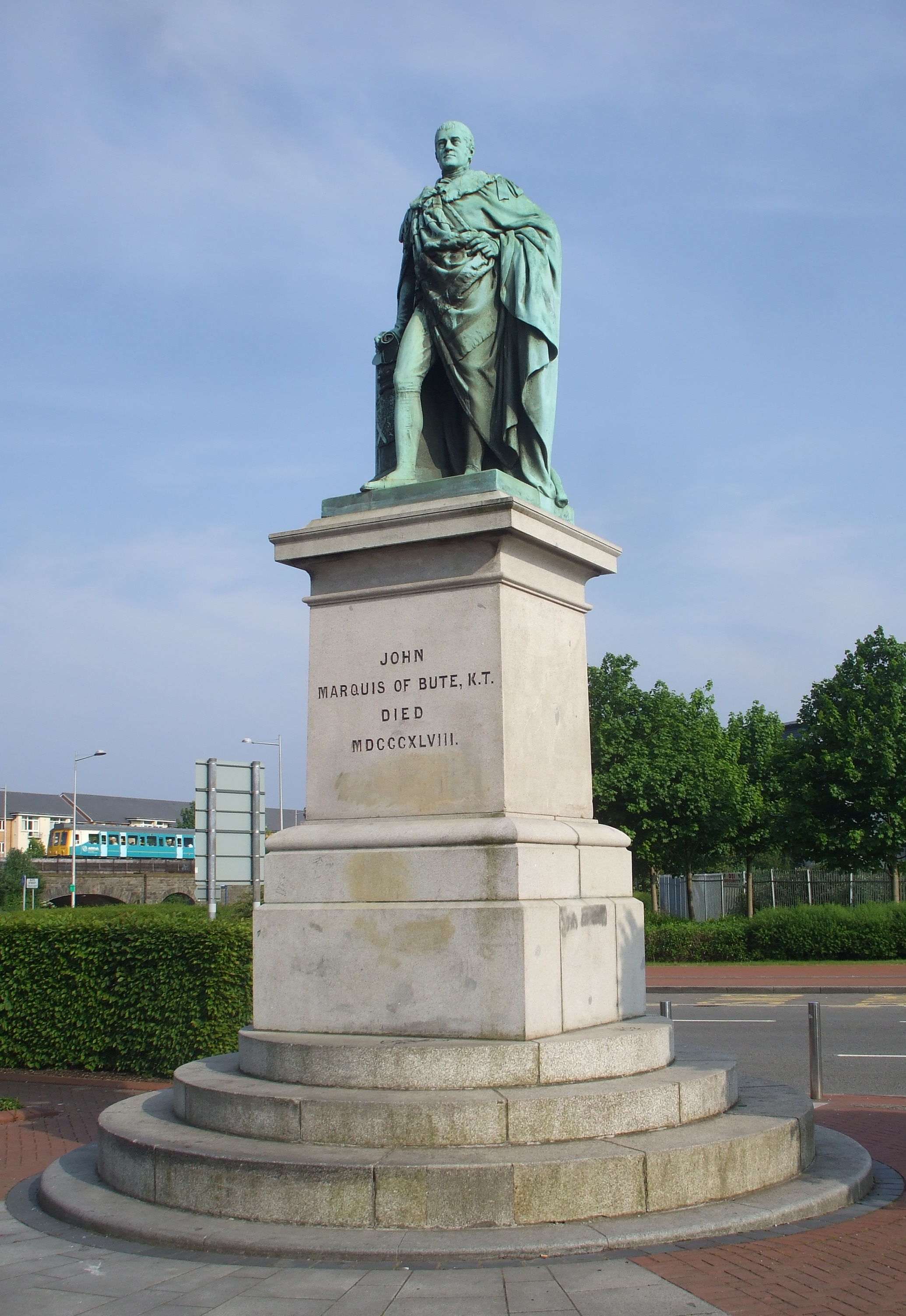
2nd Marquess of Bute, Callaghan Square, Cardiff

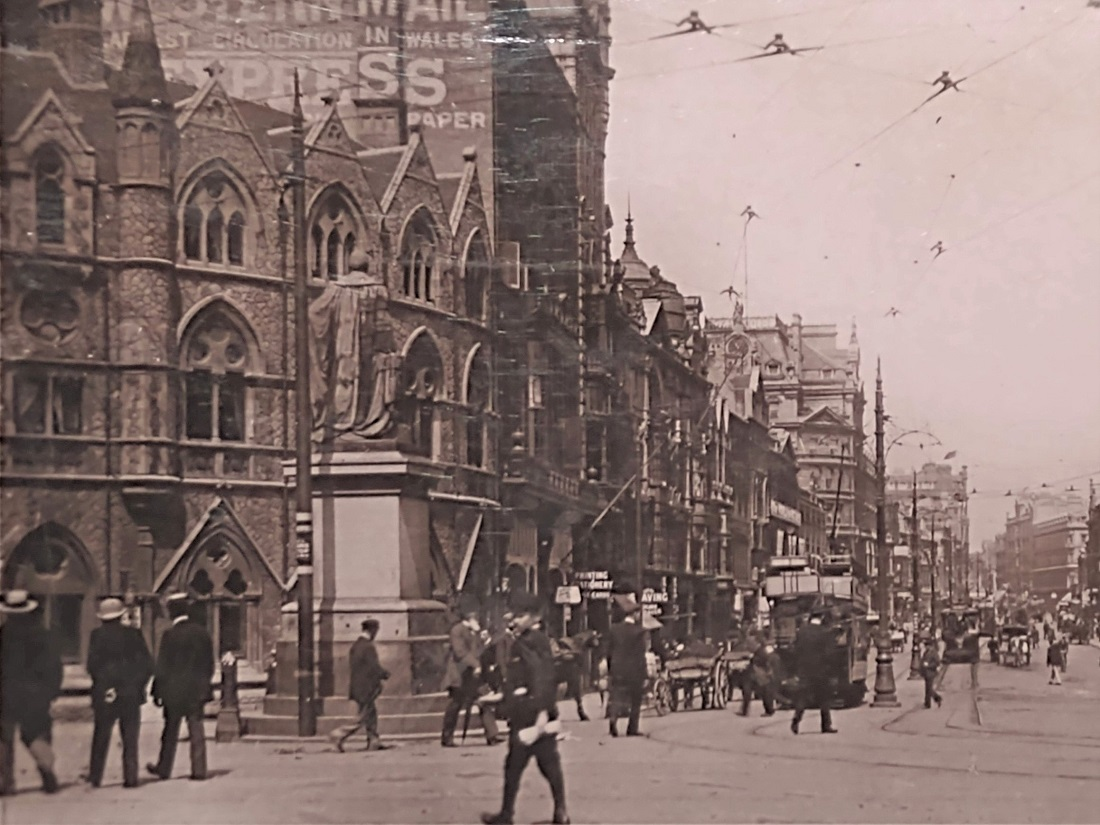
Statue at the south end of St Mary Street c. 1905

A statue of the Second Marquess of Bute stands in Callaghan Square, Cardiff, Wales in recognition of John Crichton-Stuart (1793 – 1848) who developed Cardiff Docks. The statue was originally unveiled in 1853. It was designed by J. Evan Thomas.

The statue became Grade II listed in 1975.

== Background ==
Crichton-Stuart inherited the Scottish and Welsh Bute estates following the death of his grandfather, in 1814. He became Lord Lieutenant of Glamorgan. He was responsible for the early commercial and industrical development of Cardiff, with the Bute West Dock being opened in his lifetime, on 5 October 1839. He died suddenly in Cardiff, on 18 March 1848.

== Statue ==
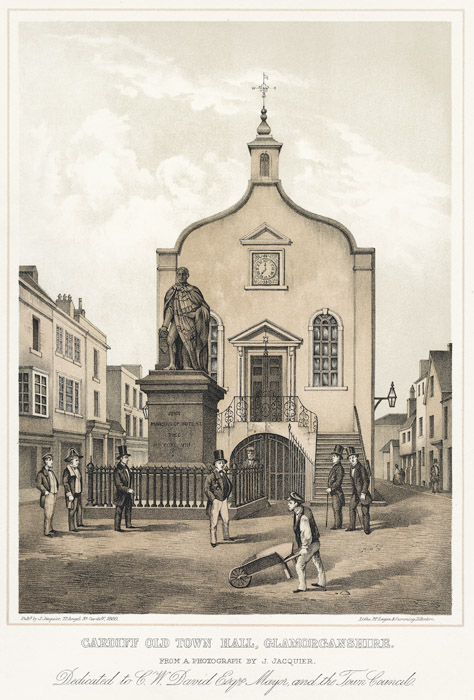
Statue of John Crichton-Stuart in front of the Town Hall (1860)

Following the death of the Marquess, a public meeting was held on 1 May 1848, which appointed a committee to arrange the creation of "a colossal statue" in his memory. It was expected to cost £2000.

The statue was designed by Welsh sculptor, J. Evan Thomas, who exhibited the statue at the London 1851 Great Exhibition, centrally in the nave of The Crystal Palace. The statue was first unveiled to the public in Cardiff in front of Cardiff Town Hall on Wednesday 13 July 1853. It was the first statue erected in Cardiff.

The figure of Crichton-Stuart is cast in bronze, showing him wearing a large flowing ceremonial robe. The bronze figure stands on a tall granite pedestal, 13 feet (4.0 m) in height. The total height of the work was 22 feet (6.7 m). It would be surrounded by an iron railing.

The statue was subsequently relocated to the southern end of St Mary Street, on an additional circular stone base, where it effectively became a roundabout at the junction.

It was moved to Bute Square (later renamed Callaghan Square) in 1999.
