= Cardiff County Borough Council =

Former council in Wales

Cardiff City Council (Cardiff County Borough Council)

History
- Founded: 1 April 1889
- Disbanded: 1 April 1974
- Preceded by: Cardiff Town Council
- Succeeded by: Cardiff City Council; South Glamorgan County Council

Elections
- First election: 1 November 1889
- Last election: 4 May 1972

Meeting place
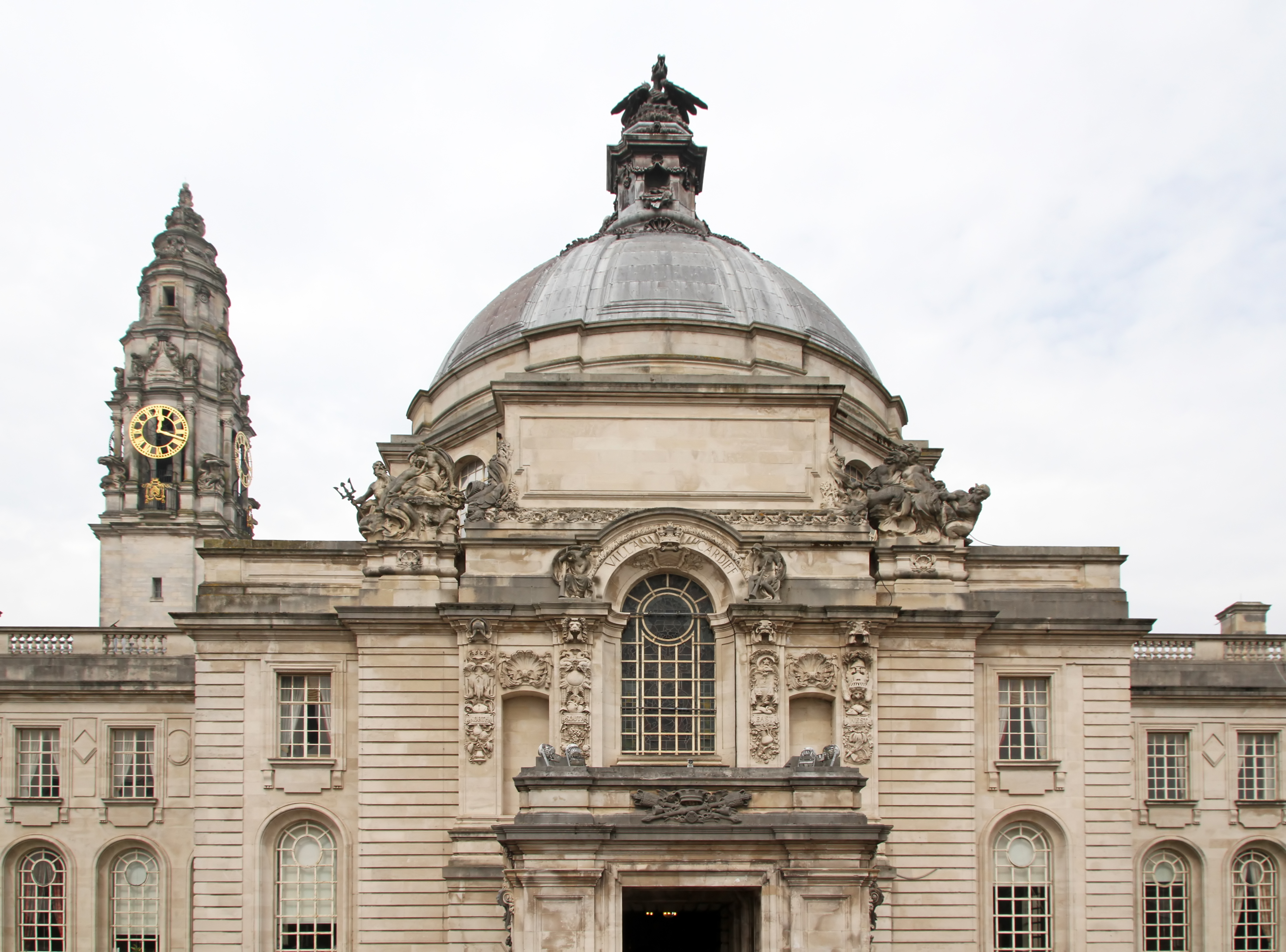
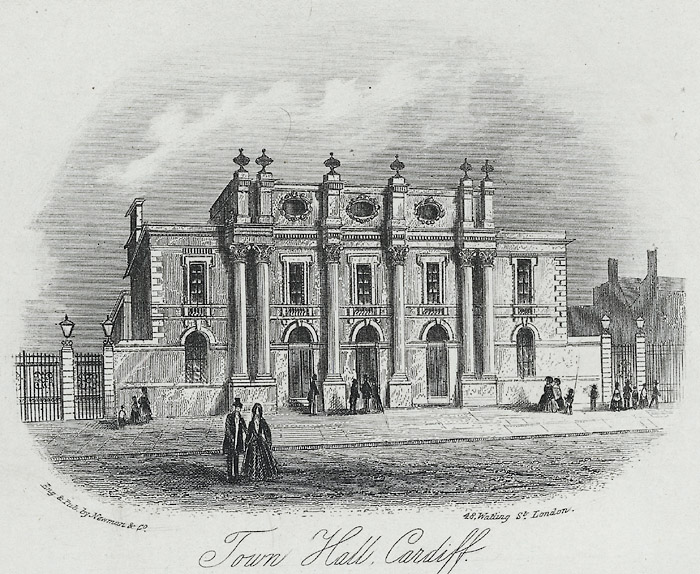
- Cardiff City Hall, headquarters of the city council Cardiff's Victorian Town Hall Cardiff Town Hall 1853-1906

Cardiff County Borough Council, known as Cardiff City Council after Cardiff achieved city status in 1905, was the elected local authority that administered the town (later city) and county borough of Cardiff, Glamorgan, Wales between 1889 and 1974. The county borough council was replaced in 1974 by a district council, covering part of South Glamorgan and also known as Cardiff City Council.

== Background ==
Cardiff had become a fully self-governing borough in 1835, with a new council becoming effective from 1 January 1836 (though it did not acquire a full-time salaried clerk until 1884). The council elected a town mayor each year.

Local government in England and Wales was reorganised following the Local Government Act 1888 with the establishment of county councils and county borough councils. Initial proposals were to give county status to all counties and ten boroughs with a population greater than 150,000. According to the 1881 census, Cardiff had a population of 123,000 and was growing rapidly. They petitioned to be given county borough status too. On 11 June 1888 the town's Member of Parliament, Sir Edward J. Reed, sent a telegram confirming the population size restriction had been reduced to 50,000.

Cardiff was given county borough status and its council became a county borough council, taking effect from 1 April 1889. The only noticeable change was the insertion of the word "County" into the council's title, Cardiff County Borough Council. The borough's municipal year began and ended each November, so legislation to increase their functions came later (this initially included education and the Poor Law).

Cardiff County Borough Council had 40 members, 30 were councillors elected by Cardiff's voters and 10 were aldermen, elected by the councillors. This pattern remained the same till the abolition of the council in 1974.

The first meeting of Cardiff County Borough Council took place at Cardiff Town Hall on Monday 8 April 1889, chaired by the Deputy Mayor (Mayor David Jones was in London on Parliamentary business). Five other Aldermen and 22 councillors were in attendance. In his introductory remarks Deputy Mayor Lewis suggested (to laughter) that councillors should be paid for their duties. Amongst items discussed were a new train station for Roath, a proposed weir for the River Taff and a report compiled by the town clerk proposing extensions to the county borough's boundaries.

=== City status ===
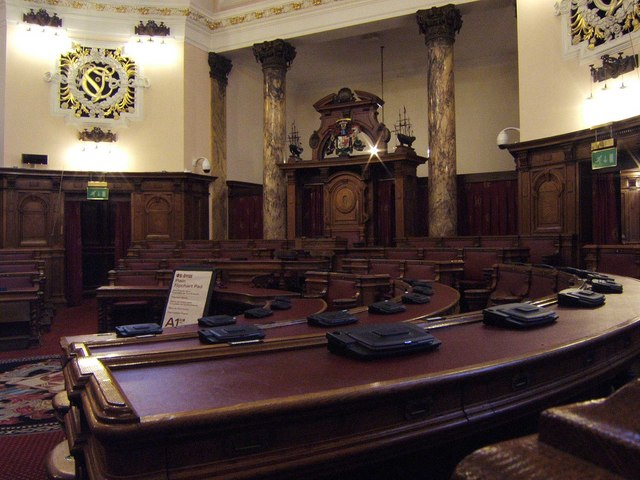
The Council Chamber at Cardiff City Hall

The council petitioned unsuccessfully in 1897 and 1902 for Cardiff to be granted city status. It was finally granted on 23 October 1905, with Cardiff's mayor becoming Lord Mayor of Cardiff. The county borough council became known as Cardiff City Council.

On Monday 29 October 1906, the new City Hall was officially opened by Lord Bute, with its new 48-seat council chamber, assembly hall and council offices.

In 1922 parts of the parishes of Caerau, Llandaff, Llanishen, Michaelston-super-Ely, St Fagans and Whitchurch were incorporated into Cardiff, together with the creation of new wards of Penylan, Llandaff and Gabalfa. The numbers of councillors increased from 30 to 39 and the number of aldermen increased from 10 to 13, giving a total representation of 52.

== Elections ==
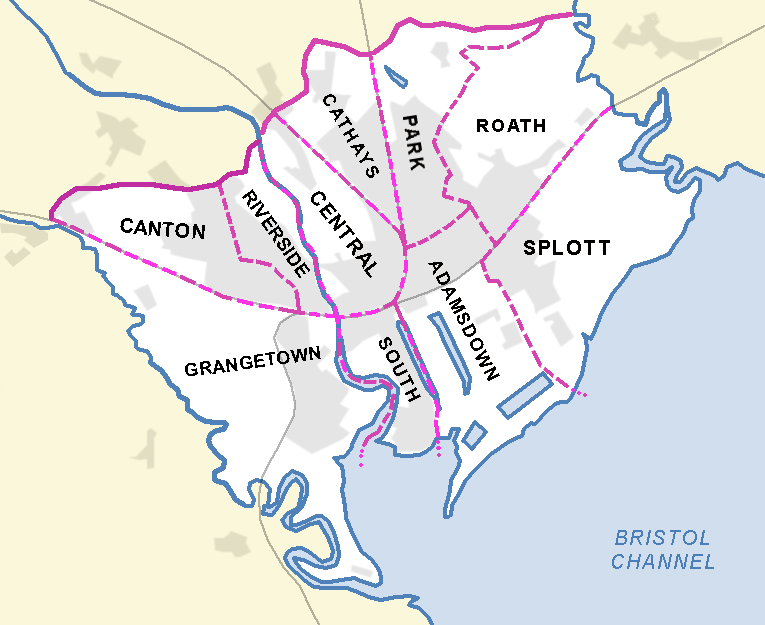
Wards of Cardiff, 1890

The first full council elections to the new county borough council took place on 1 November 1889, though contests took place in only the Canton and West electoral wards.

In 1889 there were five electoral wards - Canton, East, Roath, South and West - each with six councillors who stood down for re-election in 3-yearly rotation. From July 1890 ten electoral wards were created, of Adamsdown, Canton, Cathays, Central, Grangetown, Park, Riverside, Roath, South, Splott. Six Liberals and four Conservatives were returned at the November 1891 elections, the same composition as prior to the election.

The first elections after Cardiff's award of city status took place on 1 November 1906. Ten councillors were elected from the ten electoral wards, of Adamsdown, Canton, Cathays, Central, Grange, Park, Riverside, Roath, South and Splott. Prior to the election, five of the seats were held by the Conservative Party, four by the Liberal Party and one by the Labour Party. The new City Hall was officially opened three days beforehand.

At the local elections on 7 May 1970, Labour recovered some ground on the Conservative Party, winning back seats in Cathays and Grangetown. The Conservative Lady Mayoress, Mary Hallinan, was the most prominent casualty, losing in the Central ward. Labour also recovered a seat from Plaid Cymru in Plasmawr.

== Dissolution ==
Local government in England and Wales was again reorganised following the Local Government Act 1972. The old administrative county of Glamorgan was subdivided, with Cardiff and the Vale between Cardiff and Bridgend forming South Glamorgan.

Cardiff became a second-tier district of South Glamorgan, with a district council, known as Cardiff City Council.

== Sources ==
- B. W. Row, F. G. Squire (1974), Cardiff 1889-1974 - The Story of the County Borough, The Corporation of Cardiff, City Hall, Cardiff
