= Cardiff Town Hall =

Municipal Building in Cardiff, Wales

Cardiff Town Hall was the name given to four buildings which successively served as the centre of local government in Cardiff, the capital of Wales between the Middle Ages and Cardiff's elevation from town to city status in 1905. Upon the rise to the title city, the fourth and last town hall was replaced by Cardiff City Hall in 1906. None of the old town halls survive.

== Gild Hall ==
In the early days of Cardiff's existence, the local government would have been centred in Cardiff Castle, but as the settlement expanded, it was necessary to have purpose-built premises and Cardiff's first gild hall (a variant spelling of guild hall, sometimes referred to as Cardiff's first town hall) was subsequently built. Very little is known of this structure, which was in use until the fourteenth century.

== Medieval town hall ==
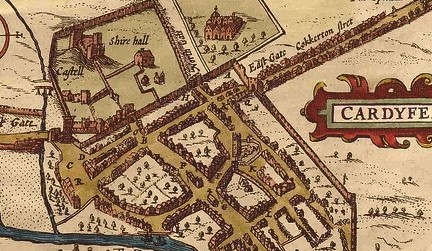
John Speed's 1610 map of Cardiff. The town hall is marked 'P'.

The gild hall was replaced by the second town hall in the 1330s. This structure, sometimes called the town house, was built on land allocated by a charter of 1331, was located in the centre of what is now St Mary Street (at 51.4803°N 3.17985°W), a site that Cardiff's town hall would occupy for the next 500 years. One of the crossroads at the town hall led down to the quay on what is now Westgate Street, another leading to St John's Church. The first meeting of the Cardiff Corporation in the building was held in 1338. Outside the town hall stood water pumps and the local stocks, which were present until the nineteenth century. Near the town hall stood a building which is believed to have been the vicarage for the old St Mary's Church. The martyr Rawlins White (c. 1485 – c. 1555) was commemorated by a plaque at the old town hall, but this was lost when the building was demolished in the 1740s.

== Georgian town hall ==
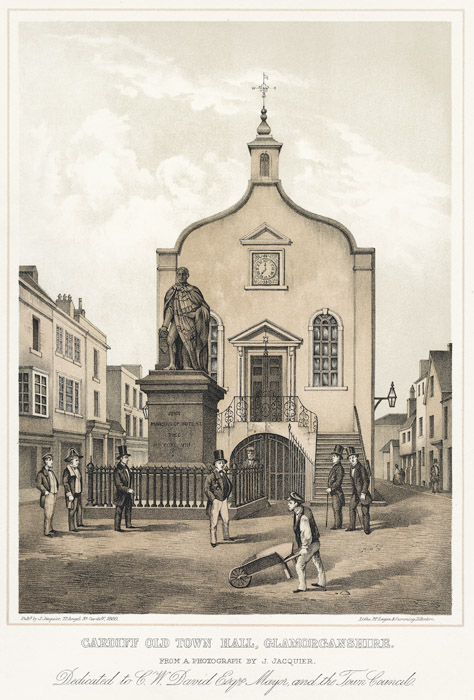
The Georgian town hall shortly before demolition.

The medieval town hall was in use for the next 403 years. By the 1730s, the building was severely dilapidated and was proving inadequate for the growing town. In addition, its location in the centre of the street was unpopular because it posed an obstruction to traffic. In 1741, the town authorities conducted a feasibility study which concluded that it would be simpler and more economically viable to replace the building rather than to repair it. In spite of the previous hall's inconvenient location, the council built the third town hall in exactly the same location as its predecessor. This was done in spite of widespread public opposition, which increased when the council asked the town's wealthier residents to contribute financially. Owing to the unpopularity of the project, the materialisation of the requested money was far from prompt, and the building was not completed until 1747 (the same year the medieval town hall was completely demolished).

The new structure was similar in design to the previous town hall: the lower floor housed the town jail (which later moved to a separate location) and also held a market. The southern end of the building also had a shop and an inn called the Shoulder of Mutton. The upper floor, accessed by a flight of steps flanked by railings, held the assembly rooms. After the jail moved to a separate location (it had been more usual for some time to house offenders in the county jail, the town hall's cells being reserved for minor delinquents), the space was occupied by the town fire brigade. John Wesley preached at the town hall in August 1788 on his last visit to the borough.

The Georgian building was never popular with the townspeople, and by the 1790s, there were already complaints that it was inconvenient and was falling into a poor condition. After the death of John Crichton-Stuart, 2nd Marquess of Bute in 1848, a statue of him (in classical attire) was erected outside the town hall. By the 1850s, Cardiff was rapidly expanding, and it was felt that the Georgian town hall needed to be replaced, and a new town hall was opened in 1853. After its replacement, the old town hall continued to be used for council meetings, concerts and other entertainments until it was sold at the end of the 1850s. It was demolished in 1861. After demolition, the statue of the Marquess of Bute was moved to the southern end of St Mary Street.

== Victorian town hall ==
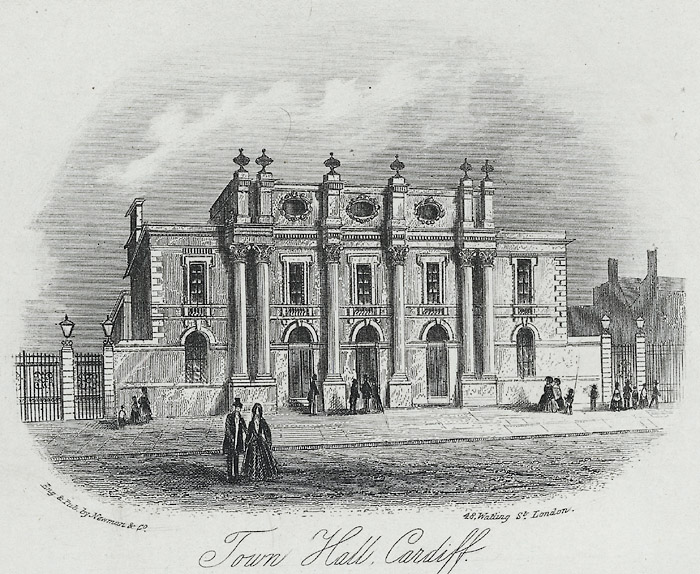
The 1853 town hall when new.

The foundation stone of the new Town Hall was laid on 27 June 1849 by the mayor of Cardiff, in front of the local MP, Dr John Nicholl, the town councillors and a small crowd.

Designed in a Palladian style by Horace Jones, it came into use in 1853. Jones later designed Tower Bridge in London. On this occasion, the new town hall was not built in the centre of the thoroughfare, but on the western side of St Mary's Street (at 51.47974°N 3.1795°W), opposite the later Cardiff Market. The building had originally been estimated to cost £10,000 but the final cost was at least £13,000 (equivalent to £1.8 million in 2024). This expensive structure housed the courts, police station, fire brigade and post office. At the time of construction, it was one of Cardiff's most impressive buildings, and was confidently predicted to last in use for many years, but was ultimately unable to meet the ever-growing needs of the expanding metropolis.

The building was expanded in 1880, and the post office moved to a separate building in 1886 to ease capacity, but in 1890, it was again decided that the building was inadequate for the rapidly growing town whose population had soared to almost 129,000. Despite the resolution, the building continued in use until the early 1900s. In 1905, when Cardiff was made a city, the accolade was officially accepted in the town hall. The new city hall was still under construction at this date – it never held the name town hall. Functions were transferred to there on its completion in 1906. After this, the redundant town hall became rundown and like its predecessors, began to deteriorate. By the 1910s, only the fire brigade was present in the building, which was eventually demolished in 1914.

== Remains ==
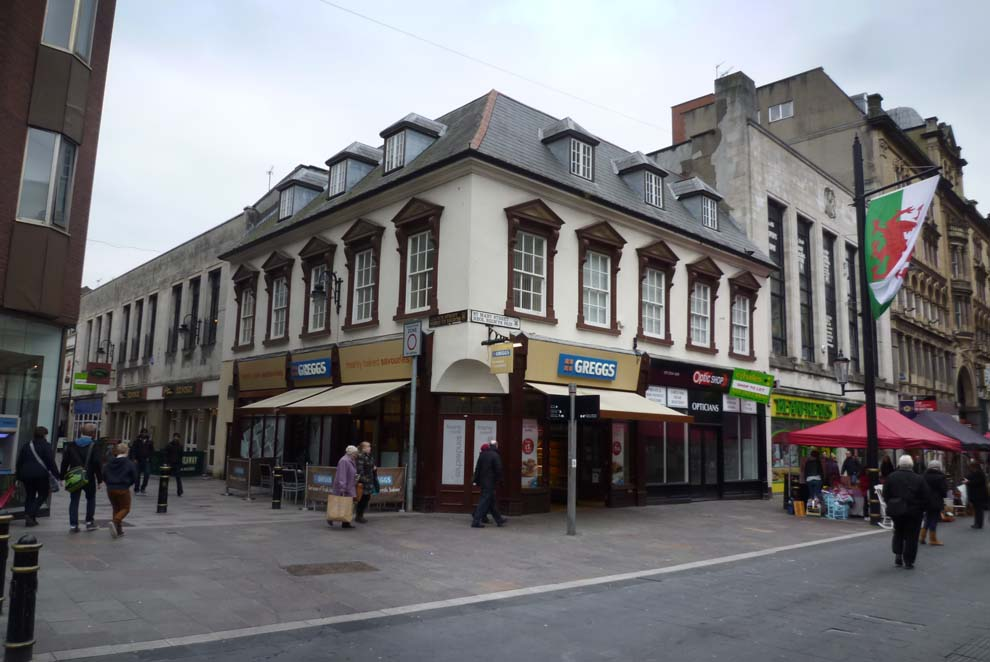
The site of the medieval town hall at the junction of High Street and St Mary Street

Today, little remains of the former town halls. The Medieval and Georgian halls are commemorated by a blue plaque, and the section of the roadway which was wider than the rest of the street (to allow traffic to pass the centrally located halls) can still be seen. A blue plaque also signifies the presence of the Victorian town hall.
