= List of public art in the London Borough of Lewisham =

This is a list of public art in the London Borough of Lewisham.

== Blackheath ==
Image	Title / subject	Location and coordinates	Date	Artist / designer	Type	Designation	Notes
	Lion	Lawn in front of Holly-Hedge House, Wat Tyler Road 51.4703°N 0.0056°W	Early 19th century	?	Sculpture	Grade II	The tablet held by the lion is inscribed NELSON/ CXXII BATTLES.
	Jubilee Memorial Drinking Fountain Diamond Jubilee of Queen Victoria	Tranquil Vale 51.4672°N 0.0066°E	1897	?	Drinking fountain	Grade II	

== Brockley ==
Image	Title / subject	Location and coordinates	Date	Artist / designer	Architect / other	Type	Designation	Notes
	Saint Mary Magdalene	St Mary Magdalen's Church, Howson Road	c. 1898–1899	?	Young Bolton	Statue in niche	—	
	War memorial	Outside St Mary Magdalen's Church, junction of Howson Road and Comerford Road 51.4593°N 0.0380°W	1917	?	—	Calvary cross	Grade II	Unveiled 7 July 1917.
More images	Deptford War Memorial	Junction of Upper Brockley Road and Lewisham Way 51.4710°N 0.0299°W	1919–1921	William Wheatley Wagstaff	William Roberts	War memorial with sculpture	Grade II	Unveiled 1921 by Major-General Sir Charles Townshend.

== Catford ==
Image	Title / subject	Location and coordinates	Date	Artist / designer	Type	Designation	Notes
More images	Catford Centre Cat	Rushey Green 51.4458°N 0.0198°W	1974	Owen Luder/Embassy Signs	Sculpture		
	Pensive Girl	Catford Town Hall	1992	Gerda Rubinstein	Sculpture		
	Water Line	Rushey Green	2006	Oliver Barratt			
	Chariot / Blue on Green	Catford	2006	Oleg Prokofiev			
	Statue of Henry Cooper	Bromley Road	2011–2019	Carl Payne	Statue		The boxer is shown holding his title belts in both hands.
	Statue of Ella Adoo-Kissi-Debrah	Mountsfield Park	2025	Hannah Stewart	Statue		A life-sized statue of the nine-year-old girl who was the first person to have air pollution recorded as a cause of death.

== Crofton Park ==
Image	Title / subject	Location and coordinates	Date	Artist / designer	Architect / other	Type	Designation	Notes
More images	War memorial	St Hilda's Church 51.4524°N 0.0394°W	1920	F. H. Greenway and J. E. Newberry	W. Richards (stonemason)	Celtic cross	Grade II	Unveiled 29 May 1920.

== Deptford ==
Image	Title / subject	Location and coordinates	Date	Artist / designer	Type	Designation	Notes
More images	War memorial	St Paul's churchyard 51.4797°N 0.0258°W	1920	?	Obelisk	Grade II	Unveiled 24 May 1920 in its original location at the Sandford Estate, Hornshay Street, New Cross. Moved here in 1986.
	Gates	Sayes Court Park	2010	?	Ornamental gates		The motifs of a mulberry stem, leaf and fruit refer to "Evelyn's Mulberry", a tree said to be from the garden of the diarist and horticulturalist John Evelyn.
	Pig sculptures	Thames Walk			Sculptures		

== Forest Hill ==
Image	Title / subject	Location and coordinates	Date	Artist / designer	Architect / other	Type	Designation	Notes
	Plaque commemorating the gift of Frederick John Horniman	Horniman Museum, London Road	1901	F. W. Pomeroy	Charles Harrison Townsend	Relief	Grade II*	
	Humanity in the House of Circumstance	Horniman Museum, London Road	c. 1902	Robert Anning Bell	Charles Harrison Townsend	Mosaic	Grade II*	
More images	Totem pole	Horniman Museum gardens	1985	Nathan Jackson	—	Totem pole	—	

== Honor Oak ==
Image	Title / subject	Location and coordinates	Date	Artist / designer	Architect / other	Type	Designation	Notes
	Bridge Parapets (southern road bridge over railway)	Honor Oak 51.4497°N 0.0462°W	c. 1960	William Mitchell				

== Lewisham ==
Image	Title / subject	Location and coordinates	Date	Artist / designer	Architect / other	Type	Designation	Notes
	Obelisk and drinking fountain	Lewisham Hill	1866	?	—	Obelisk	—	
	Prudentia	Former Prudential Building, 187–197 High Street	1908	F. W. Pomeroy	Paul Waterhouse	Statue in niche	Grade II	
	Lewisham Military Hospital War Memorial	University Hospital Lewisham, High Street 51.4572°N 0.0151°W	after 1918	?	—	Memorial stones	—	
	Lewisham War Memorial	Memorial Gardens, High Street 51.4536°N 0.0160°W	1921		E. A. Stone	Obelisk	Grade II	Unveiled 7 May 1921.
	St Stephen's Church War Memorial	St Stephen's Church 51.4641°N 0.0103°W	1921	?	—	Hooded Calvary cross	Grade II	Unveiled 3 September 1921.
	The Whisper	Bromley Road	1983	André Wallace	—	Sculptural group	—	
	Blue Well	University Hospital Lewisham	2007	Chris Marshall		Sculpture	—	Alludes to the namesake of Ladywell, a well on the medieval pilgrimage route to Canterbury which was renowned for its healing properties.
	Riverside Light Installation	Riverside Building, University Hospital Lewisham	2007	?		Light installation	—	
	Memorial to Asquith Gibbes	Lewisham Police Station	2019	Simon Smith		Relief	—	Unveiled 27 June 2019. Gibbes was the founder of the Lewisham Equality Council, in 1981. Inscribed "Race Equality/ Asquith Gibbes MBE/ 4 November 1934 – 16 July 2013"

== New Cross ==
Image	Title / subject	Location and coordinates	Date	Artist / designer	Architect / other	Type	Designation	Notes
	Statue of Robert Aske	Haberdashers' Aske's Boys' School 51.4681°N 0.0436°W	1825	William Croggon	—	Statue	Grade II	
	Francis Drake and Robert Blake	Deptford Town Hall, New Cross Road 51.4754°N 0.0379°W	1905	Henry Poole	H. V. Lanchester, James Stewart and E. A. Rickards	Architectural sculpture	Grade II*	
	Admiral Lord Nelson and an admiral of 1905	Deptford Town Hall, New Cross Road 51.4754°N 0.0379°W	1905	Henry Poole	H. V. Lanchester, James Stewart and E. A. Rickards	Architectural sculpture	Grade II*	
	Water and Wine	Goldsmiths, University of London	1990	Michael Kenny	—	Sculpture	—	
	Black Door	Goldsmiths, University of London		Svein Møxvold	—	Sculpture	—	

== Sydenham ==
Image	Title / subject	Location and coordinates	Date	Artist / designer	Type	Designation	Notes
	Livesey Hall War Memorial South Suburban Gas Company	Perry Hill, Lower Sydenham 51.4314°N 0.0372°W	1920	Sydney March	War memorial with sculpture	Grade II	

== Telegraph Hill ==
Image	Title / subject	Location and coordinates	Date	Artist / designer	Type	Designation	Notes
	Memorial to Olaudah Equiano	Telegraph Hill Lower Park	2008	Pupils of Edmund Waller Primary School, and the Friends of Telegraph Hill Park	Memorial	—	
