= Third Church of Christ, Scientist, London =

Mansion block development in London

Third Church of Christ, Scientist
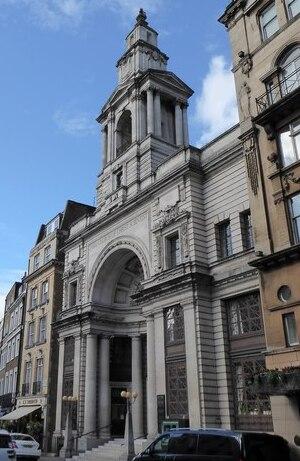
- Third Church of Christ, Scientist

General information
- Type: Church
- Architectural style: Edwardian
- Location: London, England
- Coordinates: 51°30′26″N 0°08′47″W
- Completed: 1912

Design and construction
- Architects: Lanchester and Rickards

Listed Building – Grade II
- Official name: Third Church of Christ Scientist
- Designated: 9 January 1970
- Reference no.: 1066941

The Third Church of Christ, Scientist is a former church whose building survives on Curzon Street in Mayfair, London.

== History ==
The Church of Christ, Scientist was established by Mary Baker Eddy in 1879. The building was built between 1910 and 1912 by the architectural partnership of Edwin Rickards and Henry Lancaster. The central tower would be added in the 1930s.

Parts of the church were demolished in 1980 to make way for offices and a central courtyard designed by Graherme Herbet Associates. The church itself continued to function but closed in the 2020s, the historic facade remains.

== Design ==
The church is built in an Edwardian Baroque style. Notable features include the niche entrance and tower inspired in design by Christopher Wren. It was Grade II listed in 1970 for its architectural interest.

The building sits on Curzon Street between other listed buildings. To its west are the barber Geo F. Trumper and Heywood Hill and to the east is the office block of One Curzon Street. Its position allows it to act as the terminating vista when looking north on Half Moon Street.
