= Half Moon Street =

Half Moon Street may refer to:

- Half Moon Street, London, a street in Mayfair, London
- Half Moon Street (film), a 1986 film
