= Statue of Captain Albert Ball =

Statue in Nottingham, England

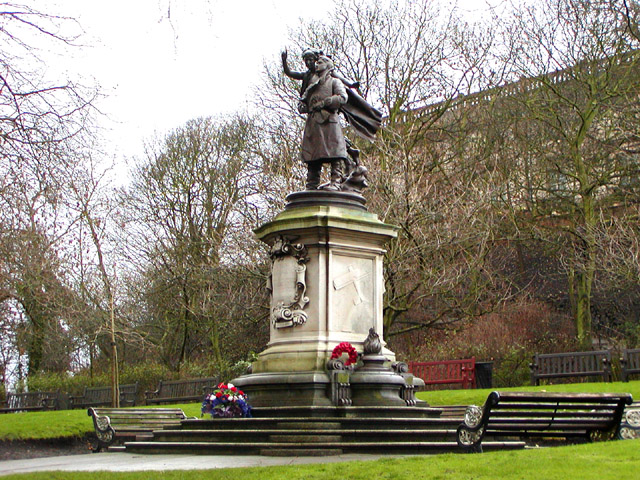
- The statue

- Artist: Henry Poole
- Year: 1921
- Medium: Bronze
- Subject: Captain Albert Ball
- Designation: Grade I
- Location: Nottingham Castle Gardens, Nottingham
- 52.94973°N 1.1541°W

A statue of Captain Albert Ball stands in Nottingham Castle Gardens, in Nottingham, England. It comprises a bronze sculpture by Henry Poole which depicts the British fighter pilot Captain Albert Ball VC DSO & Two Bars, MC accompanied by an allegorical female figure, standing on a stone pedestal by the architect Edwin Alfred Rickards. The memorial was unveiled in 1921, was listed at Grade II in 1972, upgraded to Grade I in 2017.

== Background ==
Albert Ball was born in Nottingham in 1896. His father, also Albert Ball, was a businessman and local politician. In September 1914, soon after the outbreak of the First World War, Ball enlisted in the 2/7th (Robin Hood) Battalion of the Sherwood Foresters (Nottinghamshire and Derbyshire Regiment) and he was quickly commissioned as a second lieutenant.

After some private flying tuition, he transferred to the Royal Flying Corps and qualified as a pilot in January 1916. He flew reconnaissance missions in France from February 1916 with No. 13 Squadron. He moved to a fighter unit, No. 11 Squadron, in May 1916 and soon recorded his first aerial victory. Within 12 months, he achieved 44 confirmed "kills", and a further 25 unconfirmed.

Ball became famous for his martial achievements, and he was described by Germany aviator Manfred von Richthofen (the "Red Baron") as "by far the best English flying man". He was promoted to acting captain in August 1916, and moved to No. 60 Squadron. He was formally recognised by the award of the Military Cross, and the Distinguished Service Order with two Bars. Ball was killed when his aircraft crashed on 7 May 1917. A month later, he was posthumously awarded the Victoria Cross. Ball was also created a Chevalier of the French Légion d’Honneur, and the Russian Order of St George (4th Class).

Ball was buried in the communal cemetery at Annœullin in France. His father bought the field where his aircraft crashed and erected a separate memorial there.

== Design ==
The bronze memorial statue by Henry Poole stands in the grounds of the Grade I listed Nottingham Castle, amidst a number of other Grade I listed buildings and structures. Also nearby are a Grade II listed war memorial sundial, and a Grade II listed war memorial obelisk.

The memorial was commissioned by Nottingham City Council and funded by public subscription. It includes a life-size statue of Ball, depicted in a standing position, wearing in his flying uniform, with his hands on his belt, looking up towards the sky. Behind him stands a robed woman standing on clouds: this allegorical figure representing "Air" is resting one hand on Ball's shoulder and pointing upwards with the other hand. The composition draws on Christian depictions of the raising of saints, drawn upwards towards heaven.

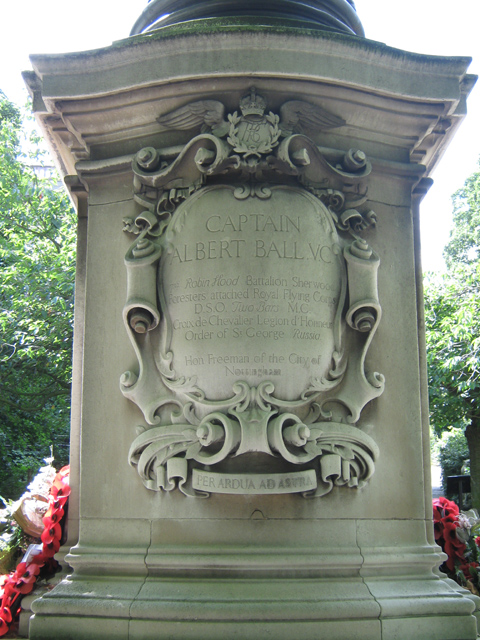
Plinth inscription

The sculpture stands on a Portland stone plinth, designed by the architect Edwin Alfred Rickards, two sides of which have relief carvings depicting an S.E.5a biplane, one flying over trenches and the other flying above clouds. The other two sides bear inscriptions within cartouches. Each inscription includes a reference to the motto of the nascent RAF, "Per ardua ad astra" ("By labour to the stars"). One inscription reads: "CAPT. ALBERT BALL V.C. / 7TH ROBIN HOOD BATTALION SHERWOOD FORESTERS / ATTACHED ROYAL FLYING CORPS, DSO (2 BARS) MC / CROIX DE CHEVALIER, LEGION D'HONNEUR, / ORDER OF ST GEORGE (RUSSIAN) / HON. FREEMAN OF THE CITY OF NOTTINGHAM / PER ARDUA AD ASTRA". And the other inscription reads "IN THE AIR / HE GAVE MOST CONSPICUOUS / AND GALLANT SERVICE TO / HIS COUNTRY AND WAS KILLED / IN ACTION FIGHTING GLORIOUSLY / MAY 7TH 1917 AGED 20 YEARS / PER ARDUA AD ASTRA".

The plinth rests on a tiered grey granite base, with three lobed steps. The base has bronze fittings, including eternal flames, a feather, a laurel wreath, and architectural feet.

The memorial was unveiled by Air Marshal Sir Hugh Trenchard on 8 September 1921. Trenchard had served as [[Hugh Trenchard as commander of the Royal Flying Corps in France|commander of the Royal Flying Corps in France]] from August 1915 to January 1918, and then Chief of the Air Staff. The ceremony included a flypast by a squadron of RAF aircraft.

A bronze cast of Poole's model for the statue is held by the National Portrait Gallery, London, donated by Ball's parents in 1929.

The statue inspired the song "Brave Captain" by English progressive rock band Big Big Train on their 2017 album Grimspound.

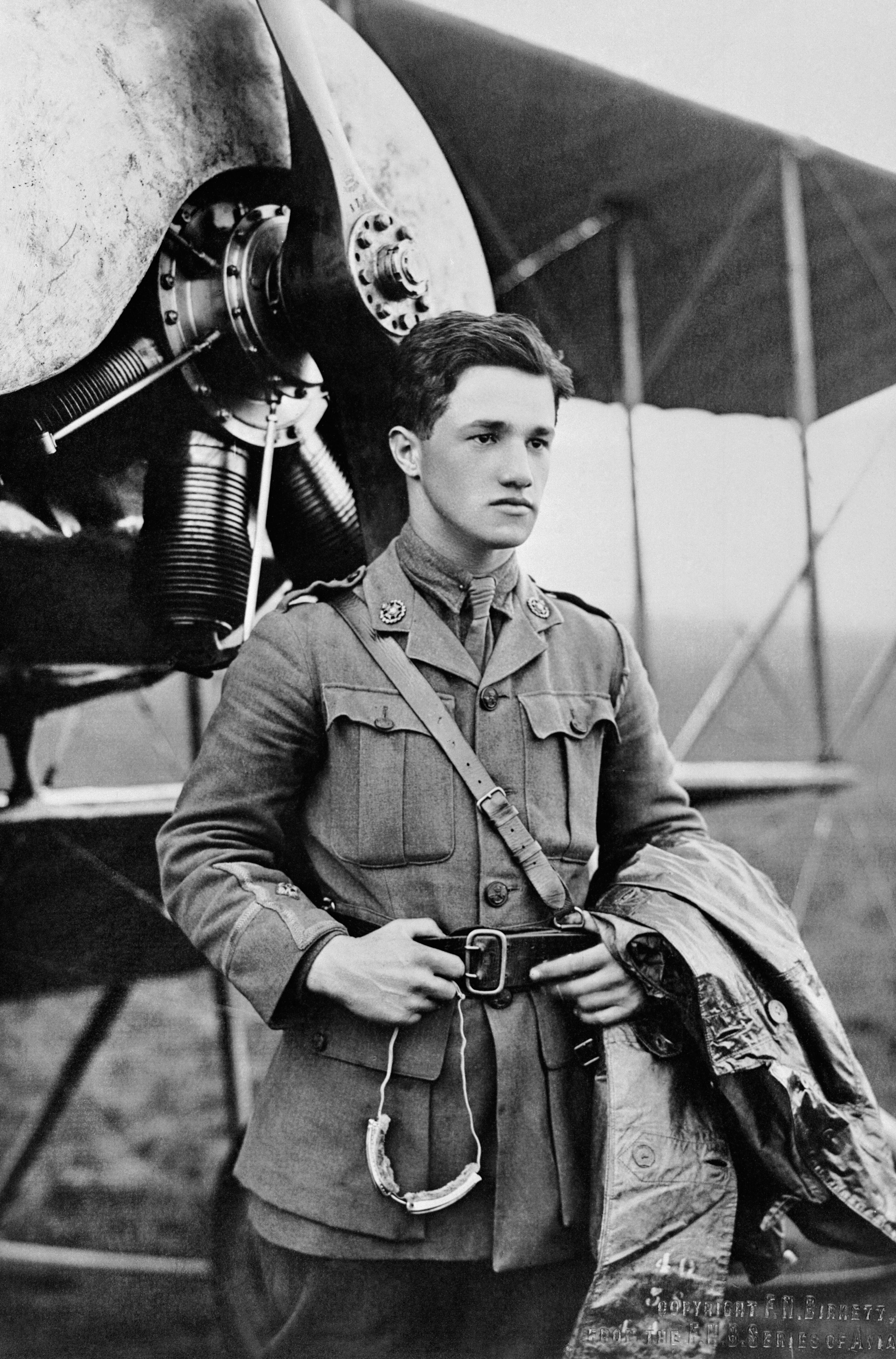
Photograph, 1917?

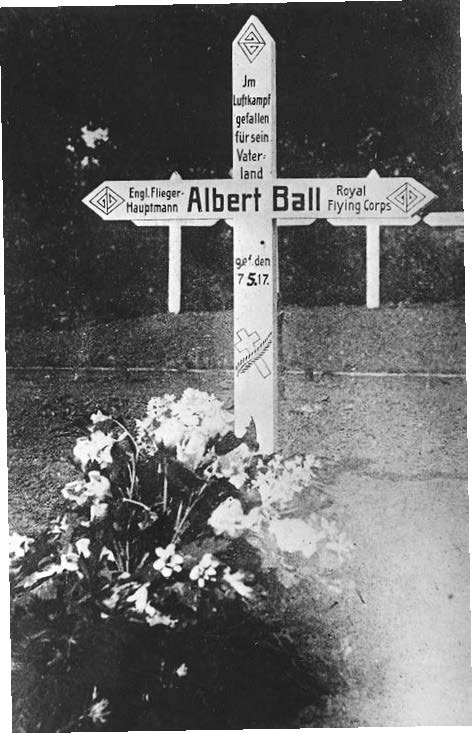
Original German marker erected at Ball's grave in Annœullin

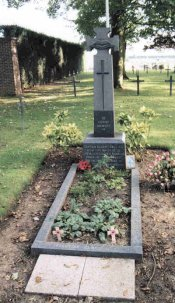
Grave site in Annœullin, France

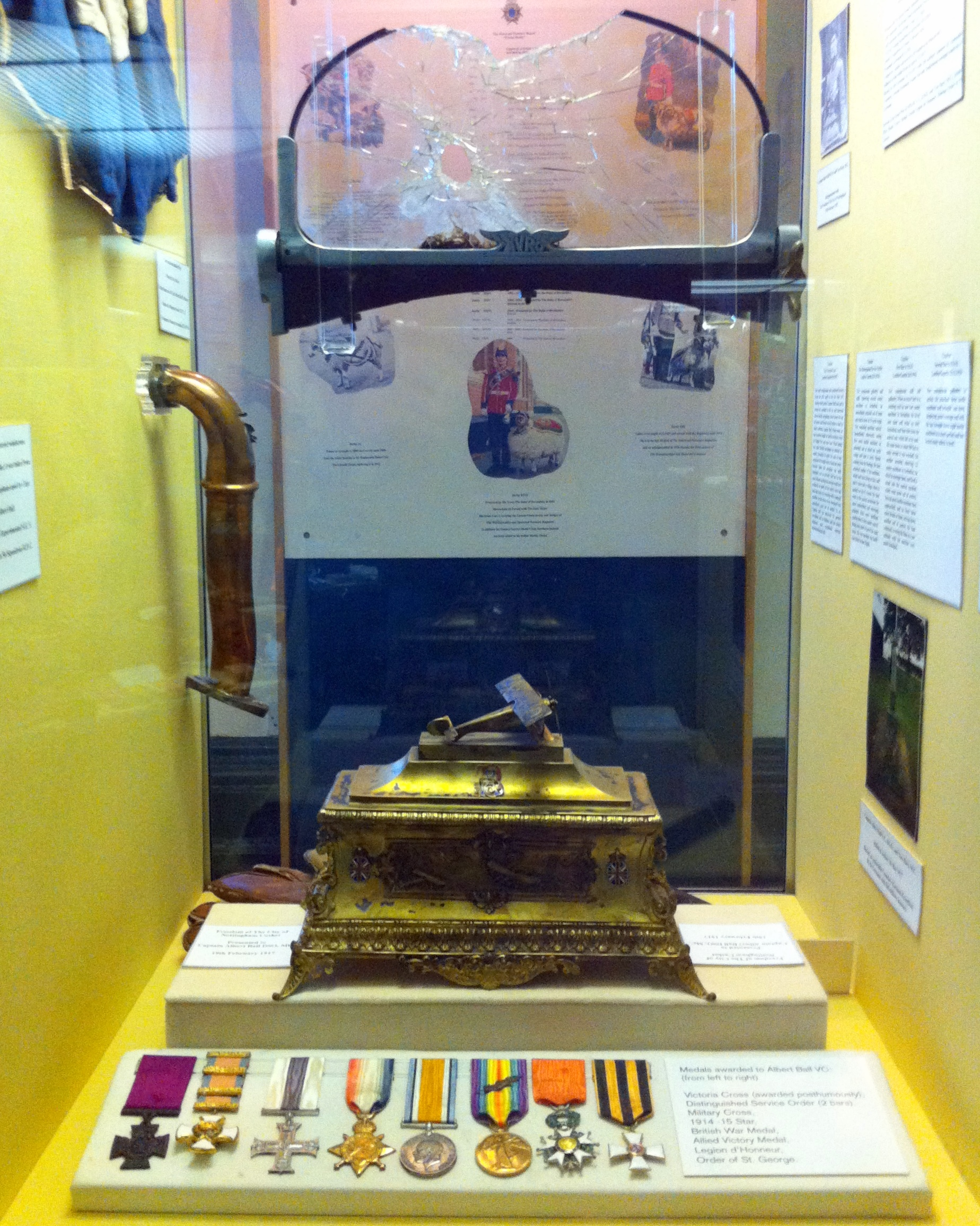
Ball's medals, displayed in Nottingham Castle

== See also ==
- Albert Ball Memorial Homes
- Grade I listed war memorials in England
