= City Hall, Cardiff =

Municipal building in Cardiff, Wales

Cardiff City Hall
- Neuadd y ddinas
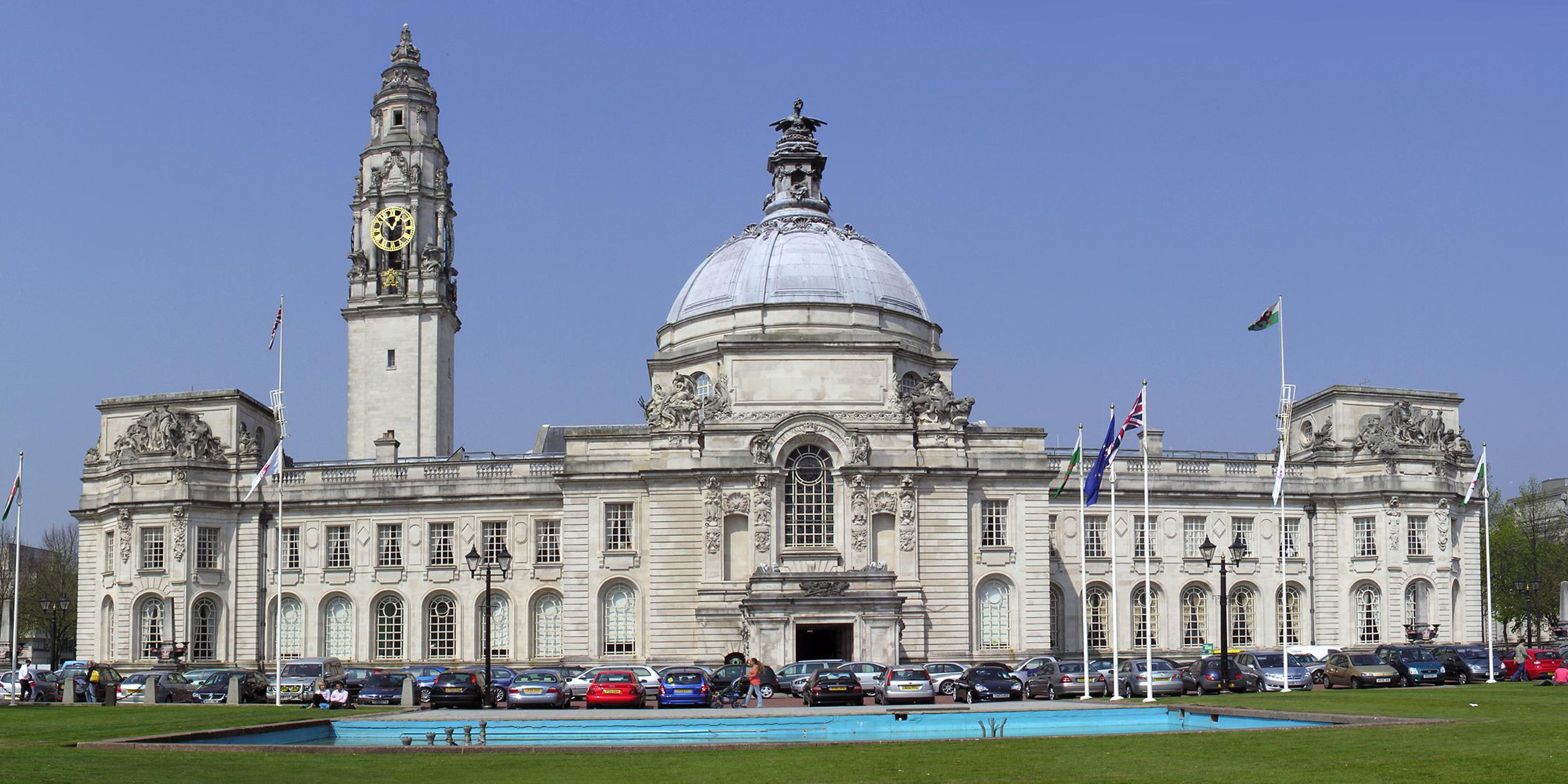
- The City Hall logo; "VC" stands for Villa Cardiff.
- Interactive map of the Cardiff City Hall area

General information
- Architectural style: Edwardian Baroque style

Listed Building – Grade I
- Official name: Cardiff City Hall
- Designated: 25 January 1966
- Reference no.: 13744
- Location: Cardiff, Wales
- Coordinates: 51°29′07″N 03°10′43″W
- Completed: 1906
- Cost: £129,708
- Client: Corporation of Cardiff

Design and construction
- Architects: Henry Vaughan Lanchester; James Stewart; Edwin Alfred Rickards

City Hall (Welsh: Neuadd y ddinas) is a municipal building in Cardiff, Wales, UK. It serves as Cardiff's centre of local government. It was built as part of the Cathays Park civic centre development and opened in October 1906. Built of Portland stone, it is an important early example of the Edwardian Baroque style. It is a Grade I listed building.

== History ==
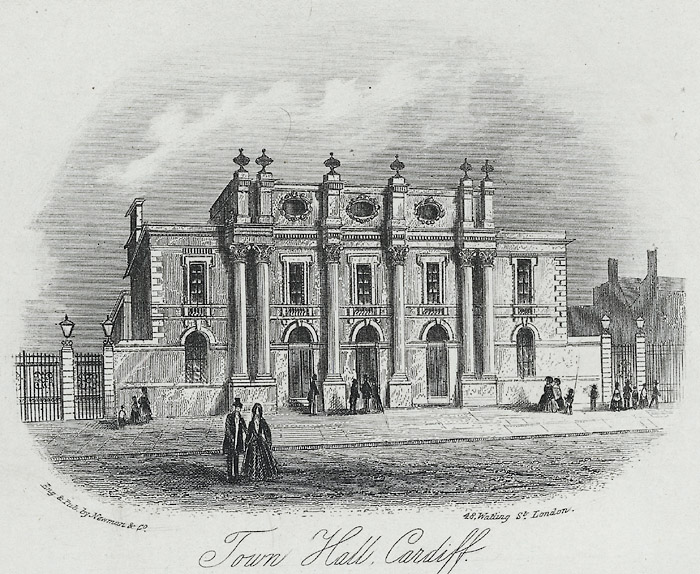
Horace Jones's Town Hall on St Mary Street

The complex was commissioned to replace Cardiff's fourth town hall on the western side of St Mary's Street, which was completed in 1853. Following a design competition, the firm of Lanchester, Stewart and Rickards was selected to design the city's fifth town hall and adjacent law courts in the Edwardian Baroque style. The contractor, E. Turner and Sons, used the world's first all-electrically operated building site, including eight 5-ton cranes to lift the stone blocks. The total building cost was £129,708 (with the concurrently-built courts costing £96,583). As Cardiff received its city charter in 1905 while construction was underway, the current building is known as City Hall. The new building was officially opened by Lord Bute on 29 October 1906.

== Exterior architecture ==
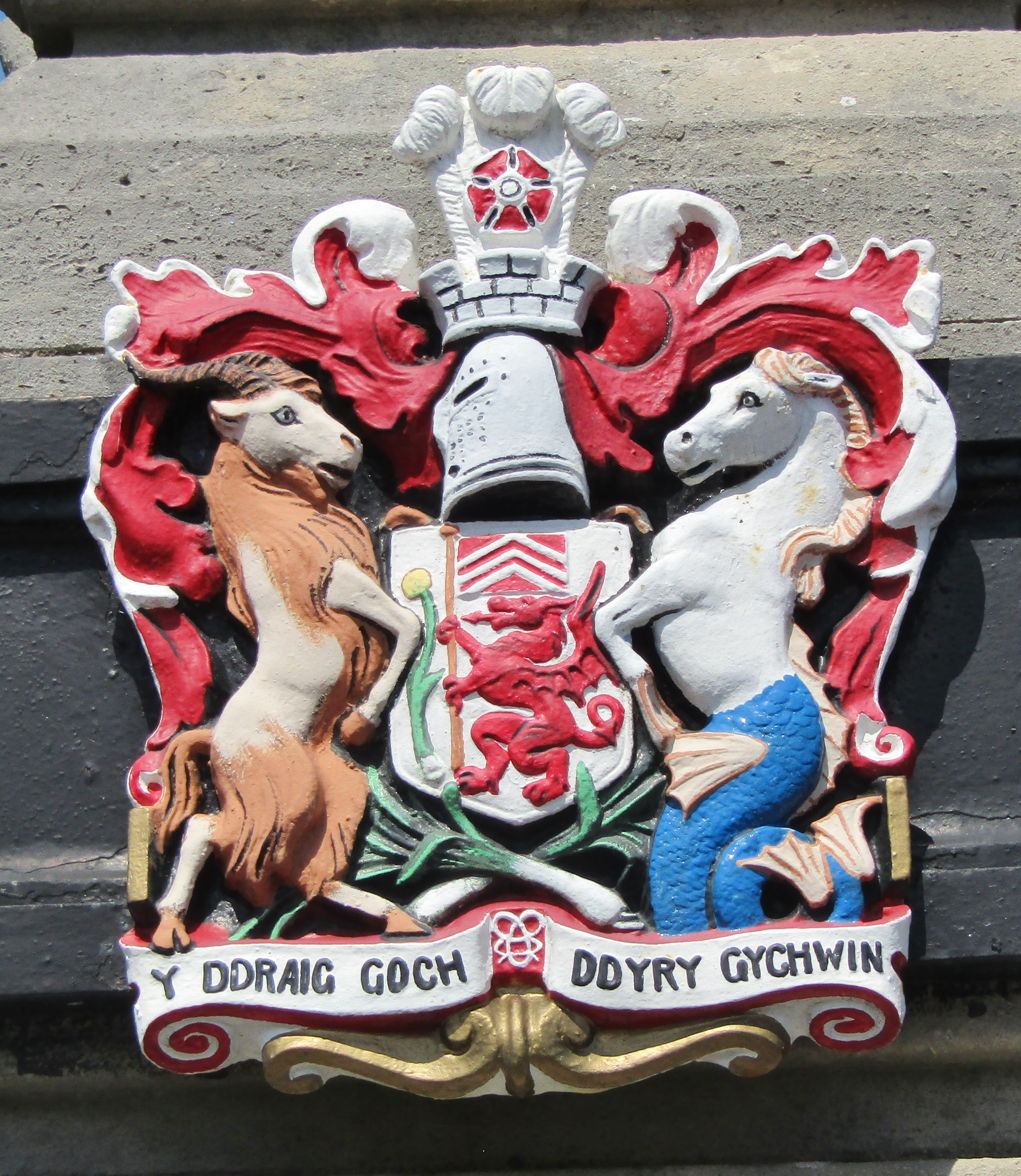
Cardiff's coat of arms in relief on a lamp post outside the City Hall.

=== Clock tower ===
The distinctive clock tower is 59 m (194 ft) in height and has a 3.7 m-diameter (12 ft) gilded dial on each of its four faces. The clock mechanism includes an hour bell and four quarter bells which are each inscribed with mottoes in English or Welsh.

=== Fountains and pool ===
In front of the entrance portico is a rectangular pool with fountains. The fountains were created to mark the investiture of Prince Charles (now King Charles III) as Prince of Wales in July 1969.

=== Memorials ===
On the southern side of the building are two memorials: the memorial on the right is dedicated to victims of the Second World War while the one on the left is dedicated to the Polish soldiers, airmen and sailors who gave their lives during that war.

== Interior rooms, functions and art collections ==
=== Marble Hall ===
The first floor landing of City Hall is decorated with statues in Pentelicon marble of famous figures from Welsh history. These were funded by a gift from David Alfred Thomas, 1st Viscount Rhondda; the individuals commemorated were decided by a competition in the Western Mail newspaper. The Marble Hall with completed statues was unveiled by David Lloyd George, then Secretary of State for War, on 27 October 1916.

Statues in the Marble Hall

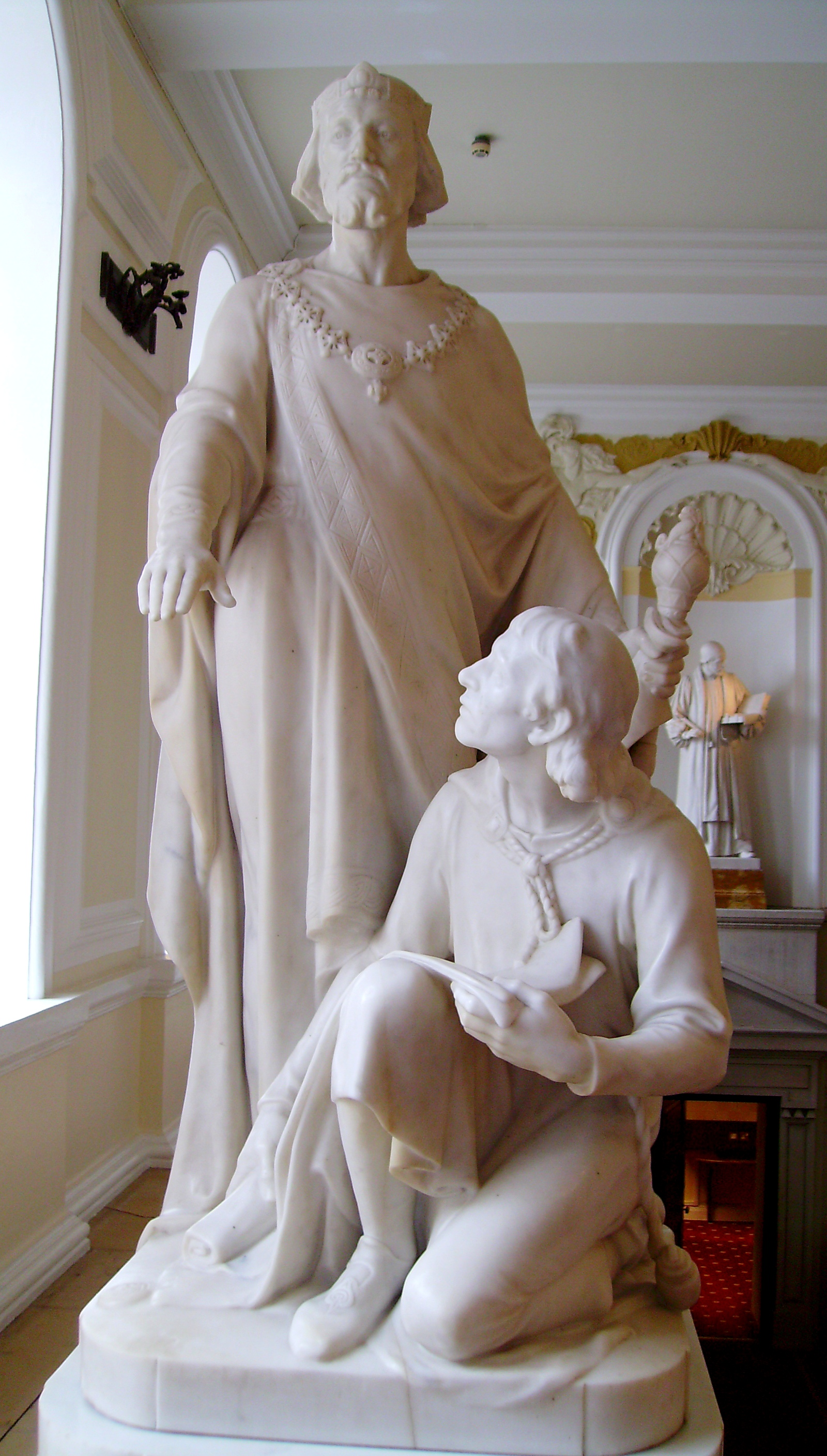
Hywel Dda

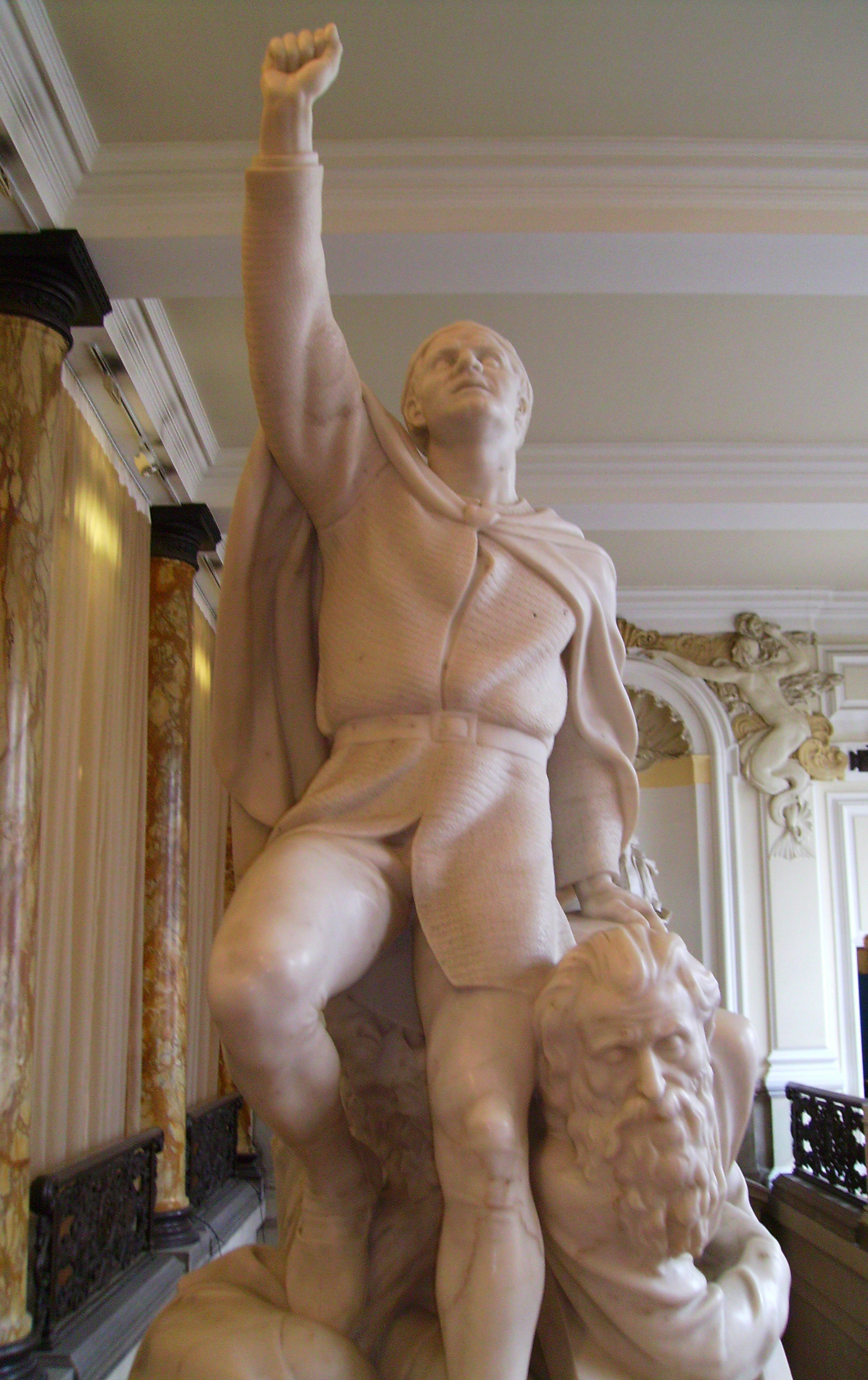
Llywelyn ap Gruffudd

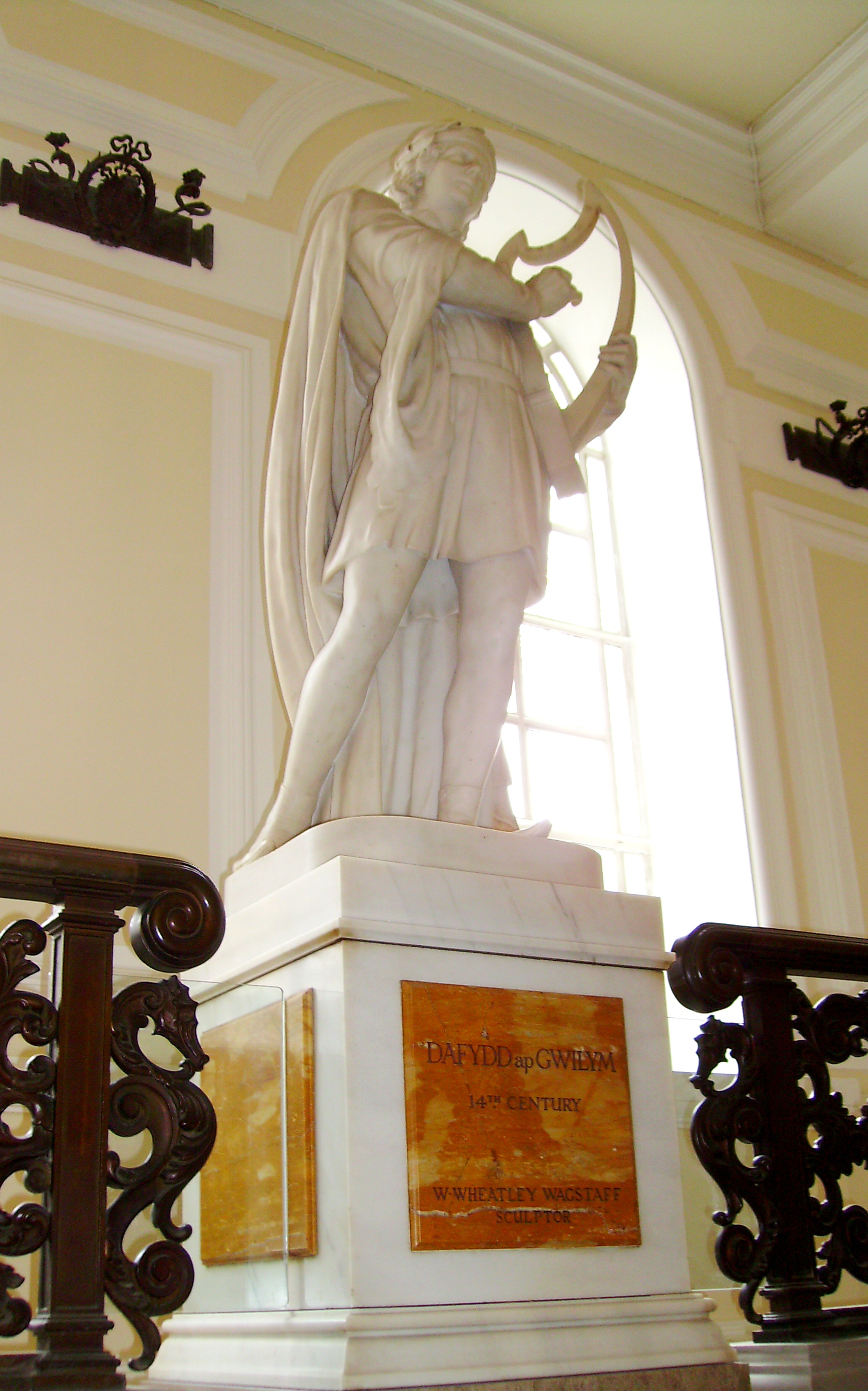
Dafydd ap Gwilym

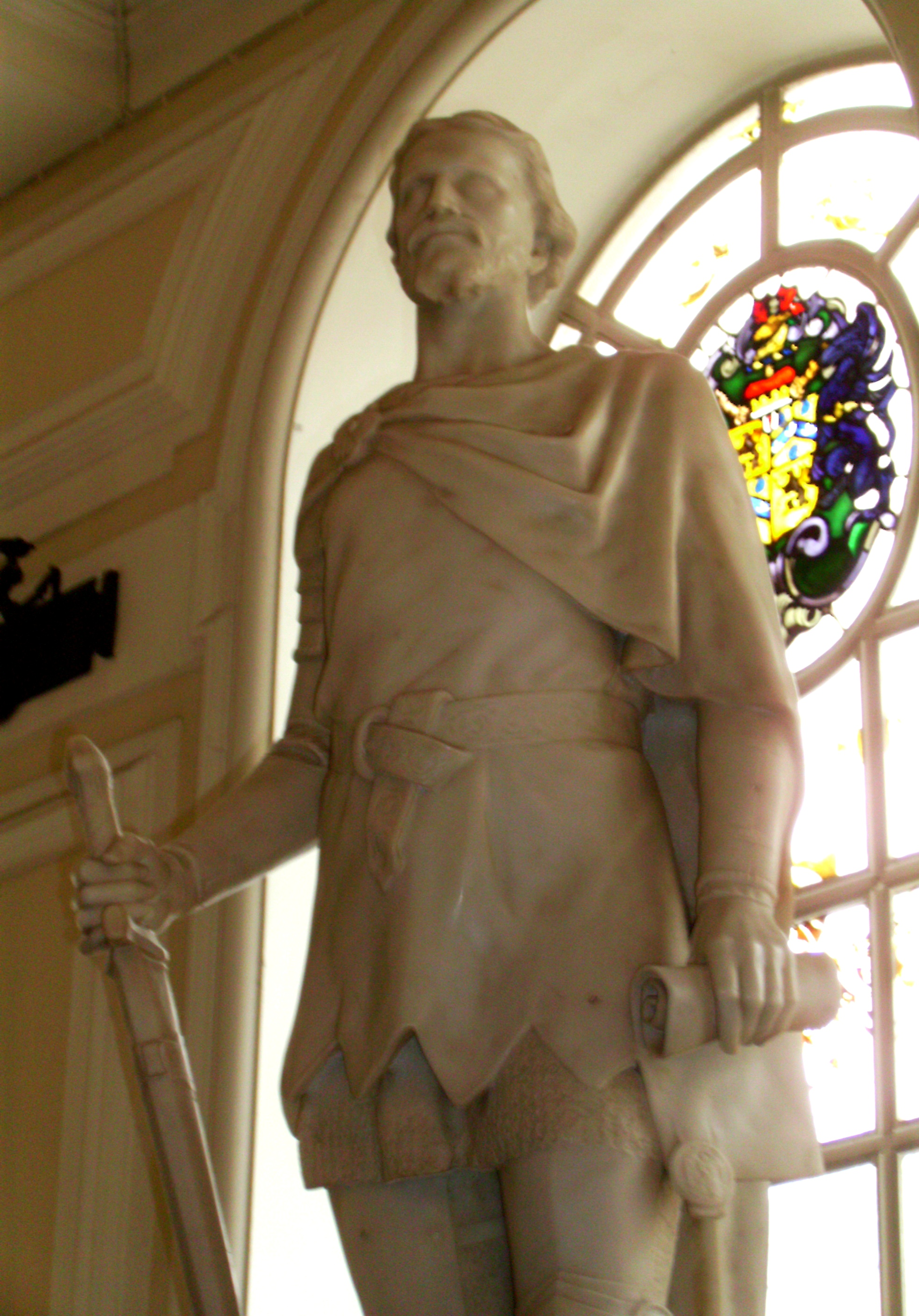
Owain Glyndŵr

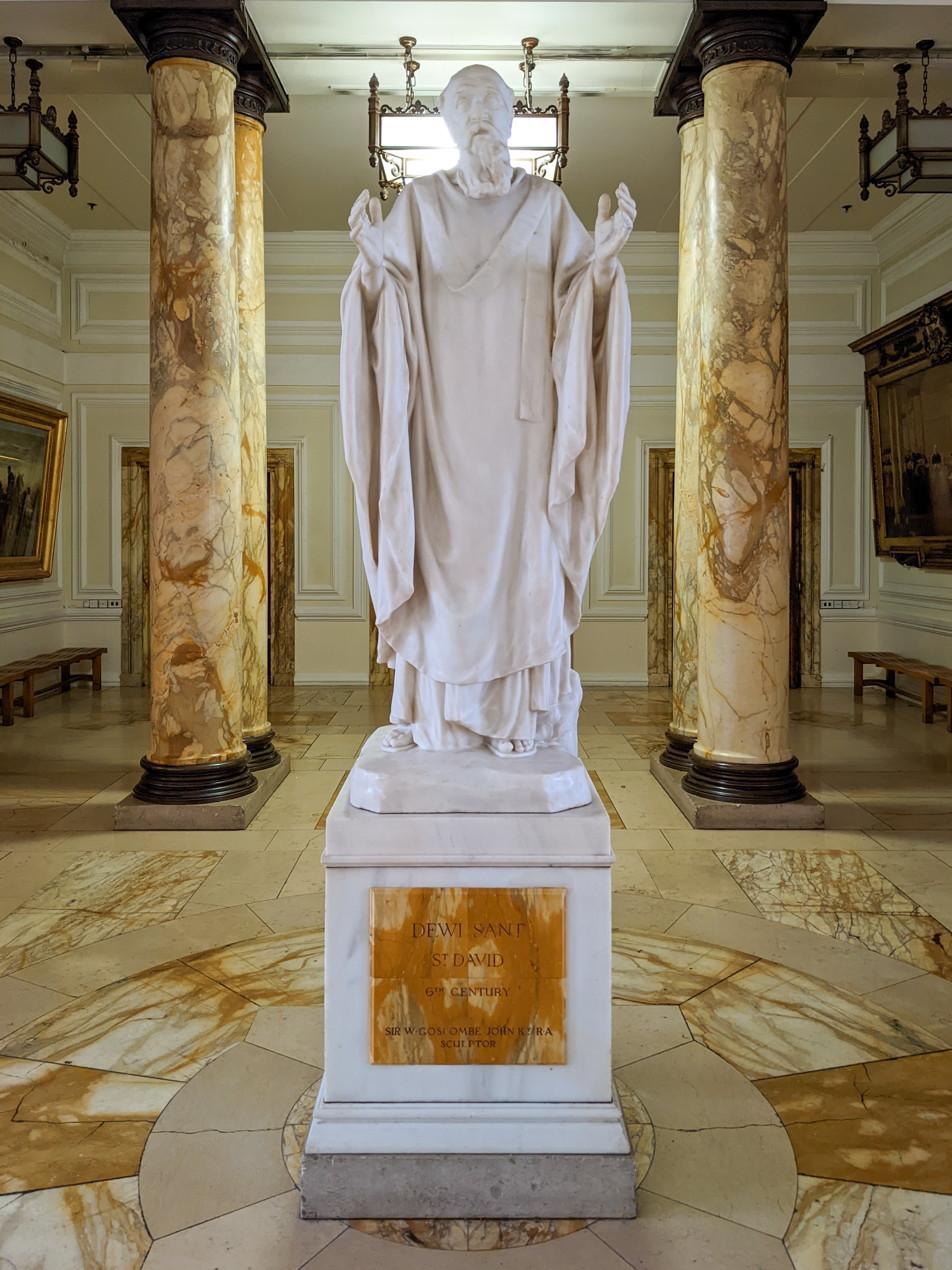
Saint David

The figures portrayed are as follows:

- Boudica (1st-century queen of the Iceni) by James Havard Thomas
- Saint David (6th-century patron saint of Wales) by Sir William Goscombe John
- Hywel Dda (king and codifier of Welsh law, 10th century) by F. W. Pomeroy
- Gerald of Wales (scholar and writer in the 12th and 13th centuries) by Henry Poole
- Llywelyn Ein Llyw Olaf (Llywelyn ap Gruffudd, the last ruling Prince of Wales) by Henry Alfred Pegram
- Dafydd ap Gwilym (Welsh poet of the 14th century) by W. W. Wagstaff
- Owain Glyndŵr (Welsh patriot and warrior of the 14th and 15th centuries) by Alfred Turner
- Henry VII (founder of the Tudor dynasty, 15th and 16th centuries) by Ernest Gillick
- Bishop William Morgan (translated the Bible into Welsh in the 16th century) by Thomas John Clapperton
- William Williams, Pantycelyn (revivalist and hymn writer, 18th century) by Leonard Stanford Merrifield
- Sir Thomas Picton (general at Waterloo, 18th and 19th centuries) by T. Mewburn Crook

In July 2020, Cardiff Council voted to remove the marble statue of Sir Thomas Picton, on account of his links to slavery.

=== Assembly Room ===
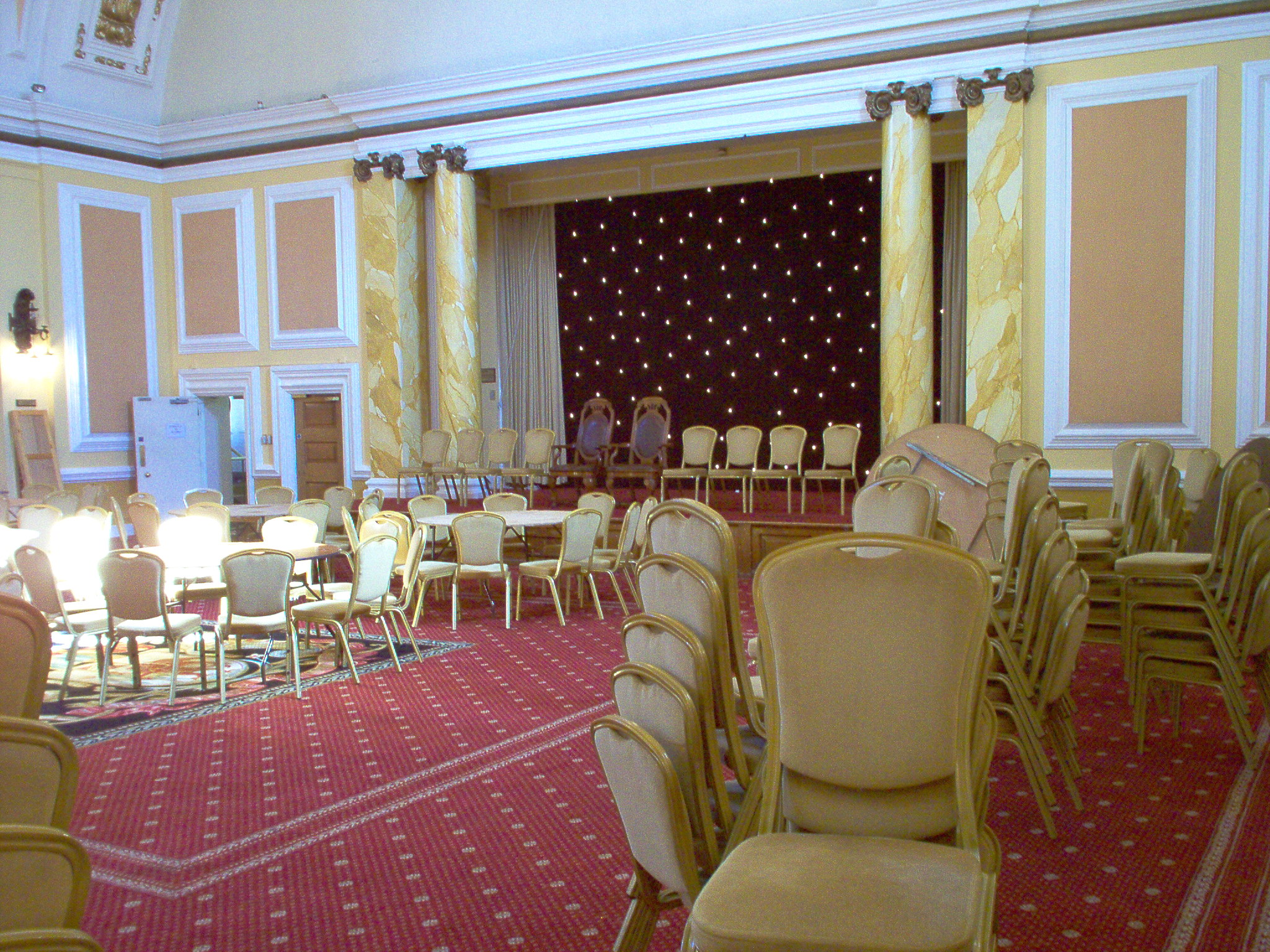
Assembly Room

This room has hosted royalty, international statesmen and diplomats, and can seat 500 diners. It is used for various ceremonies, conferences and events during the year. It is decorated with mouldings picked out in gold leaf, of mermaids and other sea creatures. Three large bronze chandeliers are contemporary to the original architects' design.

=== Council Chamber ===
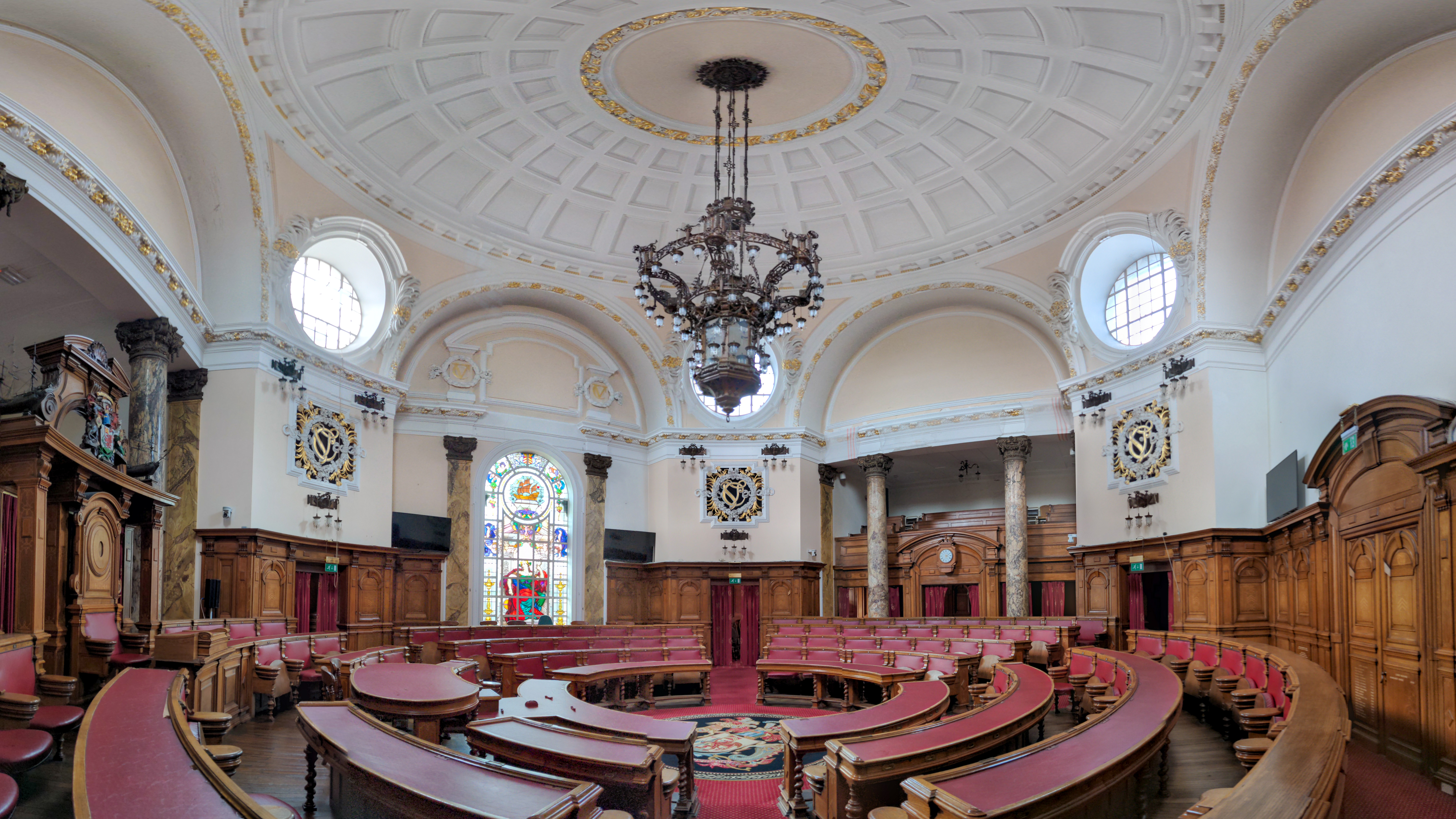
The Council Chamber

This is located above the main entrance portico and directly below the main dome of the building. Hanging from the dome is a bronze chandelier designed by Edwin Alfred Rickards. The arrangement is unusual in that the seating is set in a circular pattern, whereas normally British council chambers have semicircular seating. The chamber was designed to host Cardiff's Council meetings (which have subsequently been relocated to County Hall in the Atlantic Wharf area). The dome of City Hall is supported by four massive pillars of Italian marble with bronze Ionic capitals. The chamber is paneled throughout in oak. The plaster work is by G.P. Bankart and the stained glass window depicts a personification of the City of Cardiff by Alfred Garth Jones, dated 1905.

== In popular culture ==
The cover of the Catatonia single "Mulder and Scully" has a UFO above the building similar to the movie poster for Independence Day.

== See also ==
- Grade I listed buildings in Cardiff
- List of tallest buildings in Cardiff
