= Half Moon Street, London =

Street in the City of Westminster, London

Half Moon Street
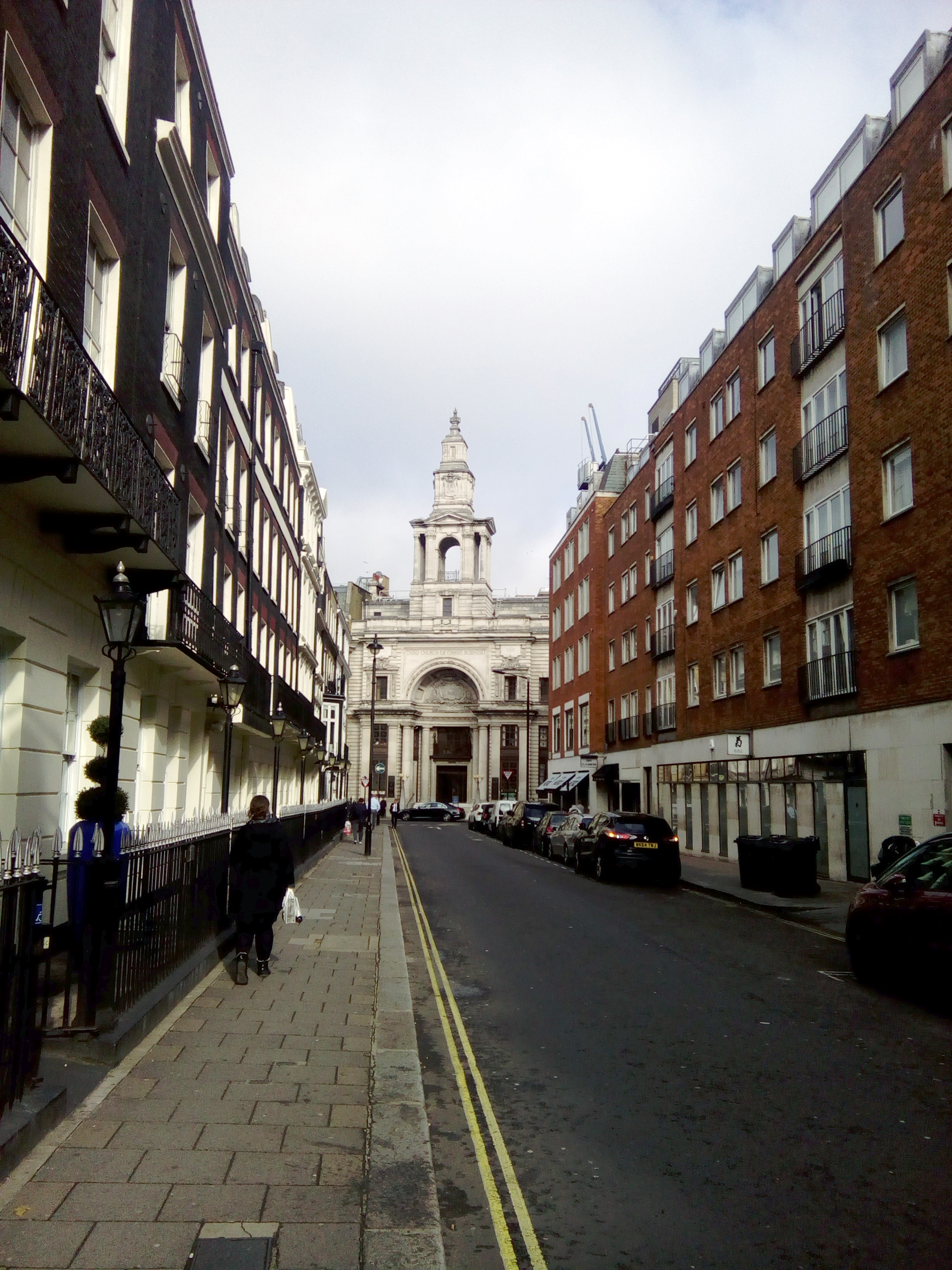
- View along Half Moon Street looking towards the Third Church of Christ, Scientist, 2017

- Location within City of Westminster
- Location: Westminster, London, United Kingdom
- Postal code: W1
- Nearest train station: Green Park
- Coordinates: 51.5063°N 0.1452°W
- North end: Curzon Street
- South end: Piccadilly

Construction
- Construction start: 1730

Half Moon Street is a street in the City of Westminster. The street runs from Curzon Street in the north to Piccadilly in the south.

== History ==
Half Moon Street was built from 1730. It takes its name from a public house that once stood on the corner with Piccadilly.

== Notable inhabitants ==
James Boswell, biographer of Dr Johnson, had lodgings in the street in 1768 at the home of Mr Russell, an upholsterer. Lola Montez, mistress of King Ludwig I of Bavaria, lived in the street in 1849. The street was known for its genteel lodgings and apartments which was still the case when Somerset Maugham visited in 1930.

== Buildings ==
Among the listed buildings in the street are parts of Flemings Mayfair Hotel and Green Park Hotel. Other listed buildings include numbers 6, 7 and 8, 12a, 14, 15, 24, and 25.
