= H. V. Lanchester =

British architect (1863–1953)

Henry Vaughan Lanchester
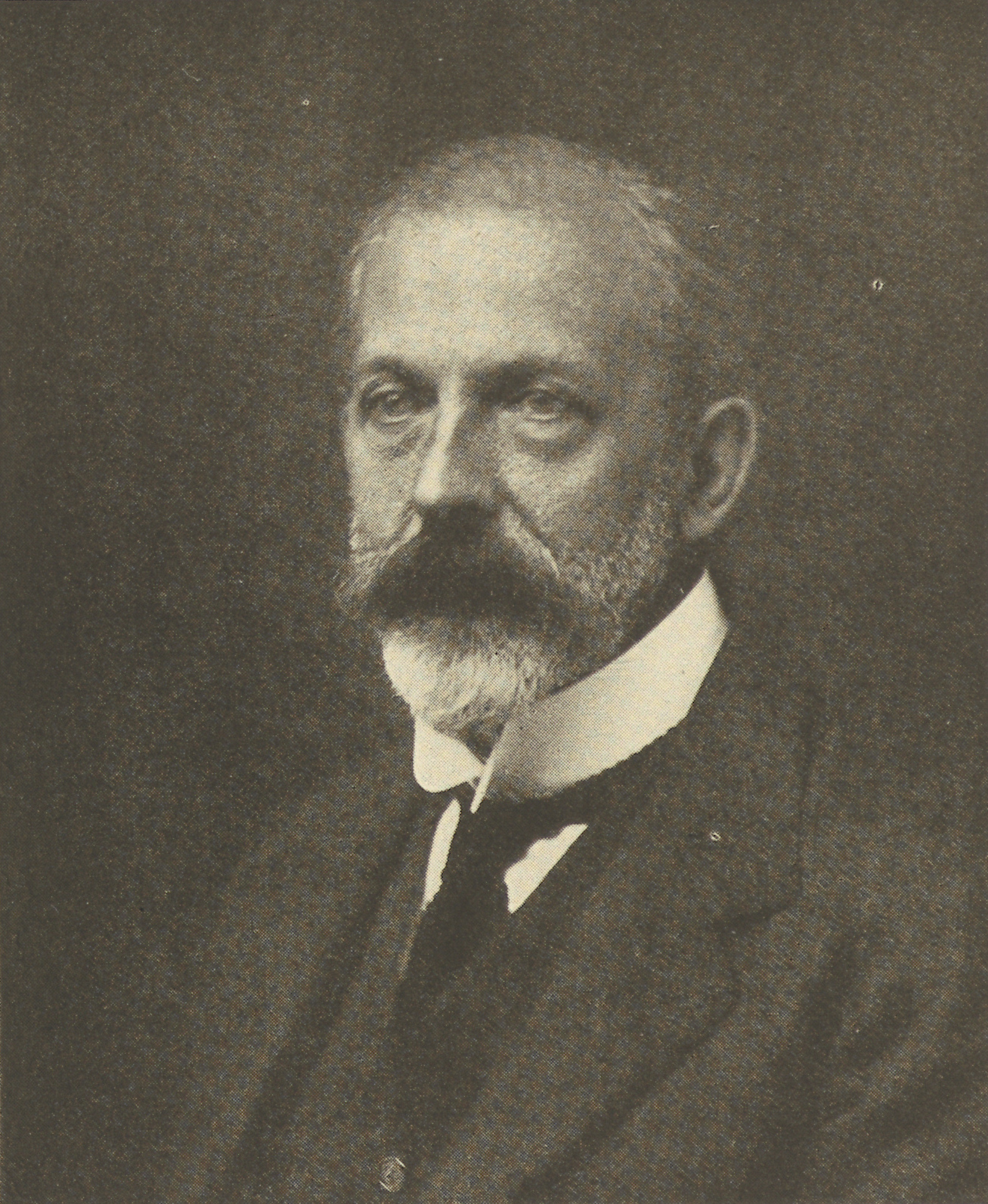
- Born: 9 August 1863; St John's Wood, London, England
- Died: 16 January 1953 (aged 89); Seaford, East Sussex, England
- Occupation: Architect
- Parent: Henry Jones Lanchester
- Relatives: Frederick W. Lanchester (brother); George Lanchester (brother); Edith Lanchester (sister); Waldo Lanchester (nephew); Elsa Lanchester (niece)
- Awards: Royal Gold Medal (1934)
- Buildings: Cardiff City Hall Umaid Bhawan Palace

Henry Vaughan Lanchester (9 August 1863 – 16 January 1953) was an English architect working in London. He served as editor of The Builder, was a co-founder of the Town Planning Institute and a recipient of the Royal Gold Medal.

== Biography ==
Lanchester was born in St John's Wood, London. His father, Henry Jones Lanchester (1834–1914), was an established architect, and his younger brother, Frederick W. Lanchester (1868–1946), was to become an engineer. He was articled to his father, but also worked in the offices of London architects F.J. Eadle, T.W. Cutler and George Sherrin from 1884 to 1894. He studied at the Royal Academy in 1886, won the Aldwinckle Prize and, in 1889, the Owen Jones Studentship.

His first architectural work was Kingswood House, Sydenham, in 1892, and he established his own practice in 1894. His first fully independent work in 1896 were offices in Old Street, for Messrs Bovril Ltd. He formed a partnership in 1896 with James A. Stewart (1865 or 6-1908) and Edwin Alfred Rickards (1872–1920). As Lanchester, Stewart and Rickards, in 1897 the firm won the competition to build Cardiff City Hall.

Lanchester was editor of The Builder from 1910 to 1912. In 1912, he visited India and prepared a report on the planning of New Delhi as well as preparing plans for Madras. In 1914 he was one of the founder members of the Town Planning Institute in London. He formed a new partnership in 1923, Lanchester, Lucas & Lodge, with Thomas Geoffry Lucas and Thomas Arthur Lodge.

In a letter to the Daily News in 1924, he proposed "gyratory traffic control" (i.e. one-way flow) for squares and complex junctions in London. This was adopted from 1926 at locations such as Trafalgar Square, Marble Arch and Hyde Park Corner.

He was appointed Professor of Architecture at University College London, and in 1934 Lanchester was awarded the Royal Gold Medal of the Royal Institute of British Architects.

== Architectural works ==
- Cardiff City Hall (1897–1905)
- Cardiff Law Courts (1901–04)
- Deptford Town Hall, London (1902–07; today part of Goldsmiths, University of London)
- Methodist Central Hall, Westminster (1905–11)
- Third Church of Christ Scientist, Curzon Street, Westminster (1910–12) tower (1931–32)
- The Post Office Lucknow (1916)
- Housing schemes in Portsmouth & Weybridge (1920–23)
- Council Building for the United Provinces, Lucknow (1921)
- Planned new suburbs in Rangoon (1921)
- Planned new suburbs in Zanzibar (1922)
- Harrogate Hospital (1925)
- Hospital Cairo (1927)
- Parkinson Building, Leeds University (1927–1951)
- Umaid Bhawan Palace, Jodhpur, India (1929–43)

== List of published work ==
- Town Planning in Madras (1918)
- Zanzibar a Study in Tropical Town Planning (1923)
- Fischer von Erlach (1924)
- Talks on Town Planning (1924)
- The Art of Town Planning (1925)
- Outline of Studies in Town Planning (1944)

== Gallery of work ==
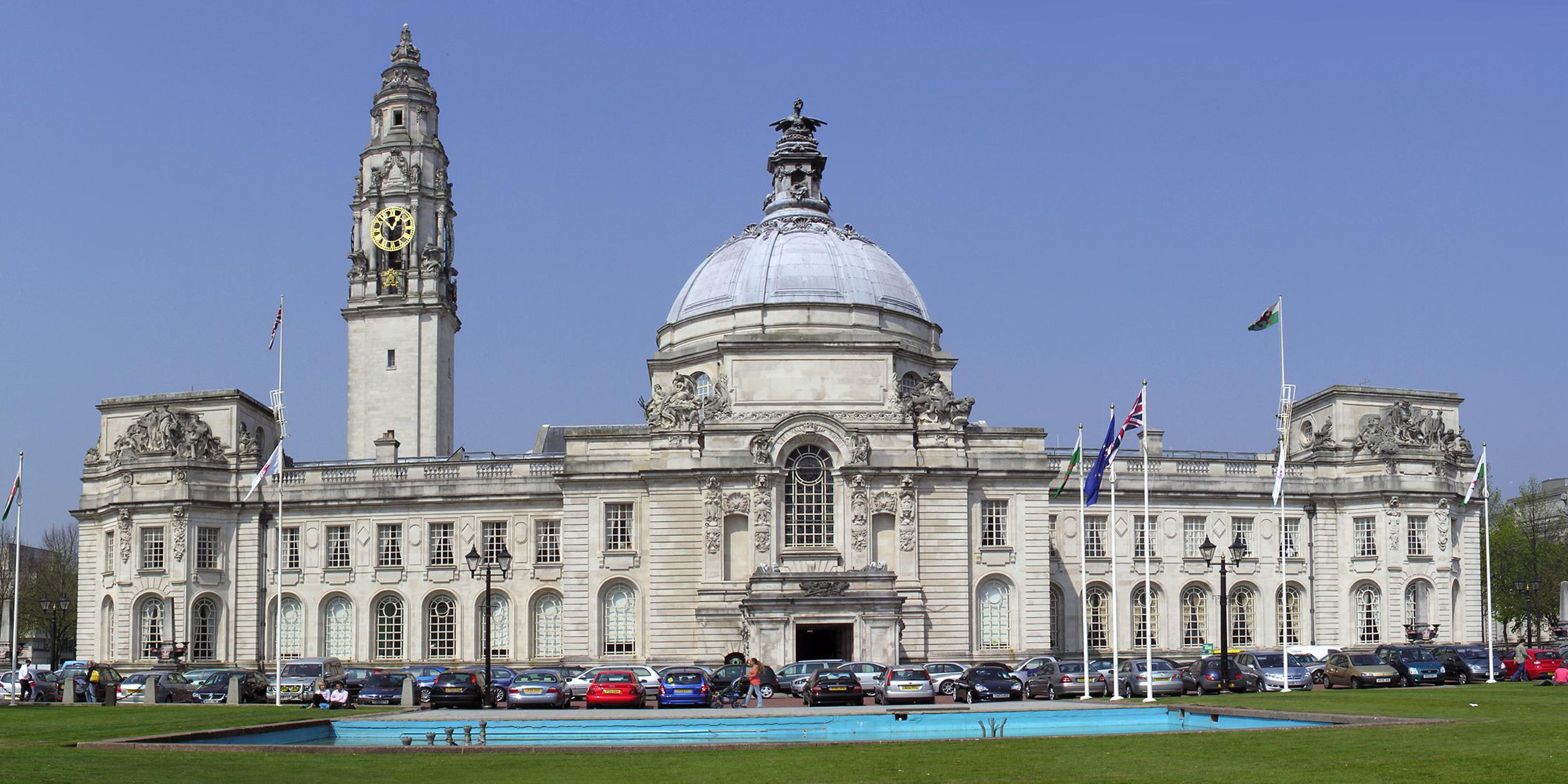
Cardiff City hall (1897-1905)

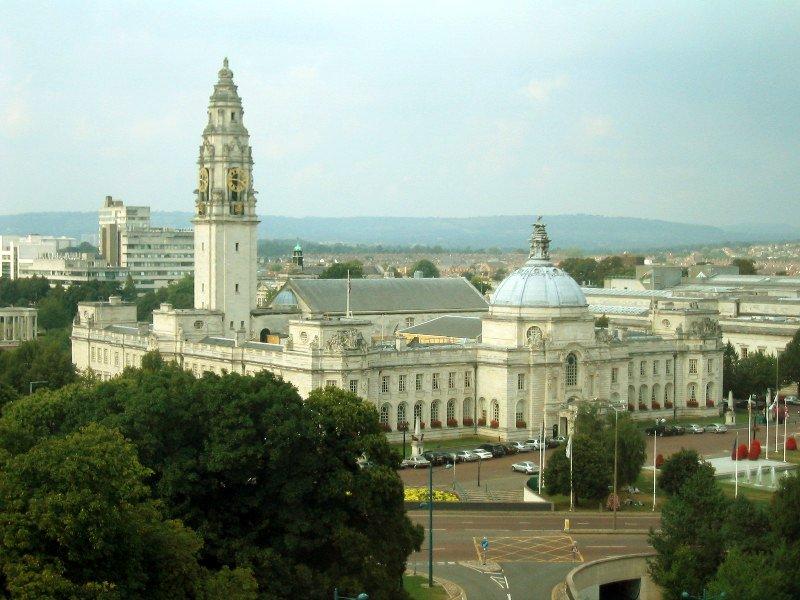
Cardiff City hall (1897-1905)

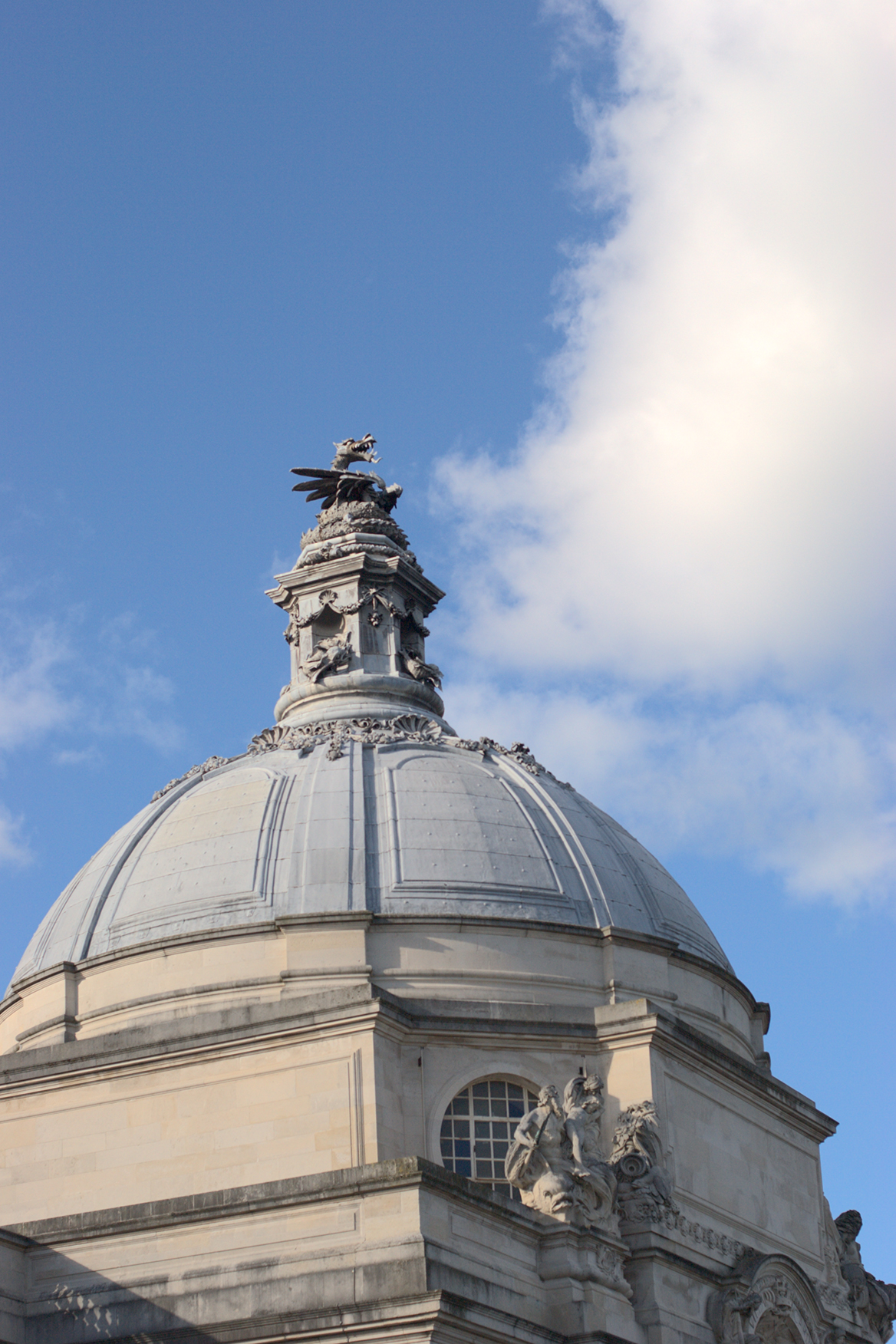
The dome, Cardiff City hall (1897-1905)

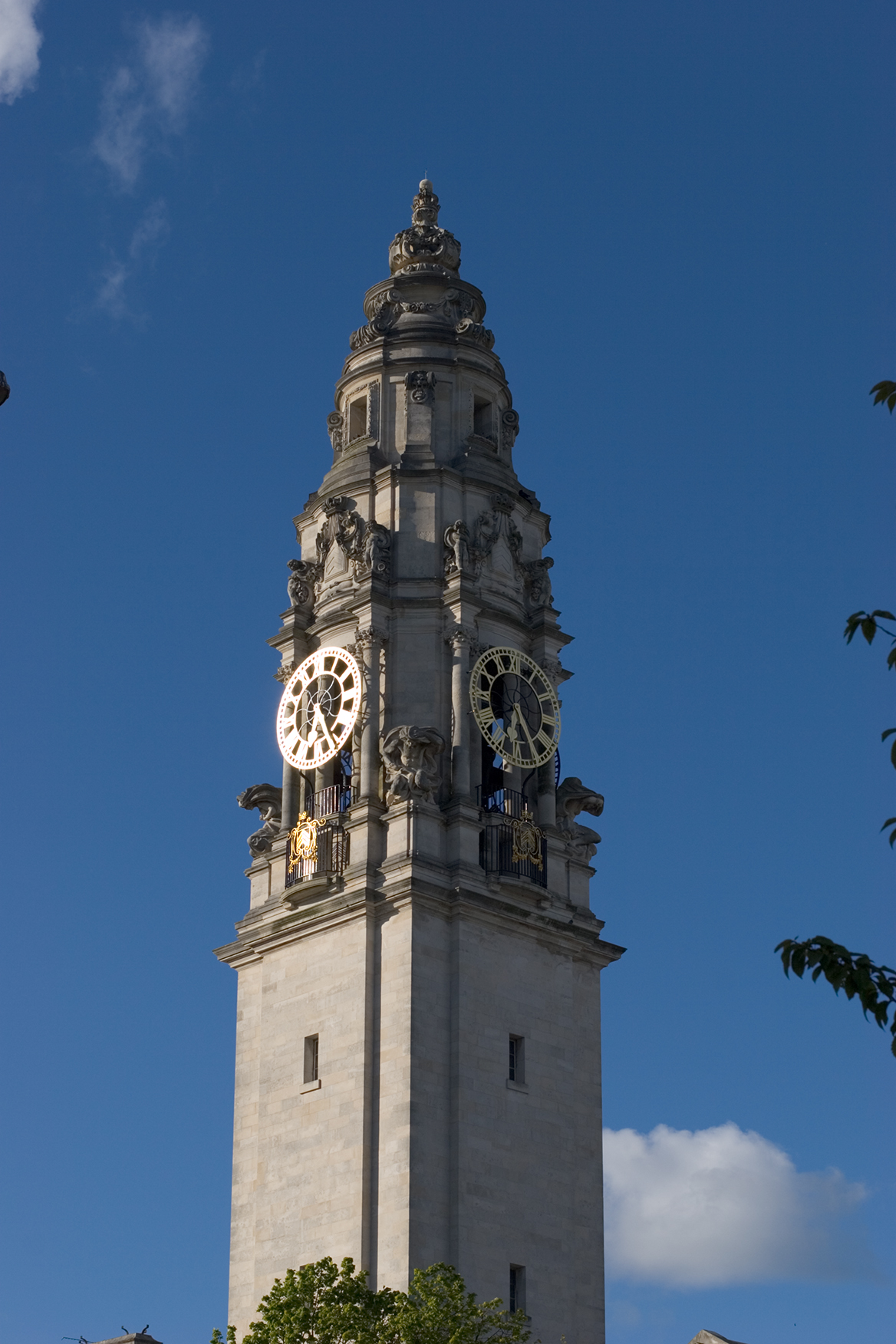
The tower, Cardiff City hall (1897-1905)

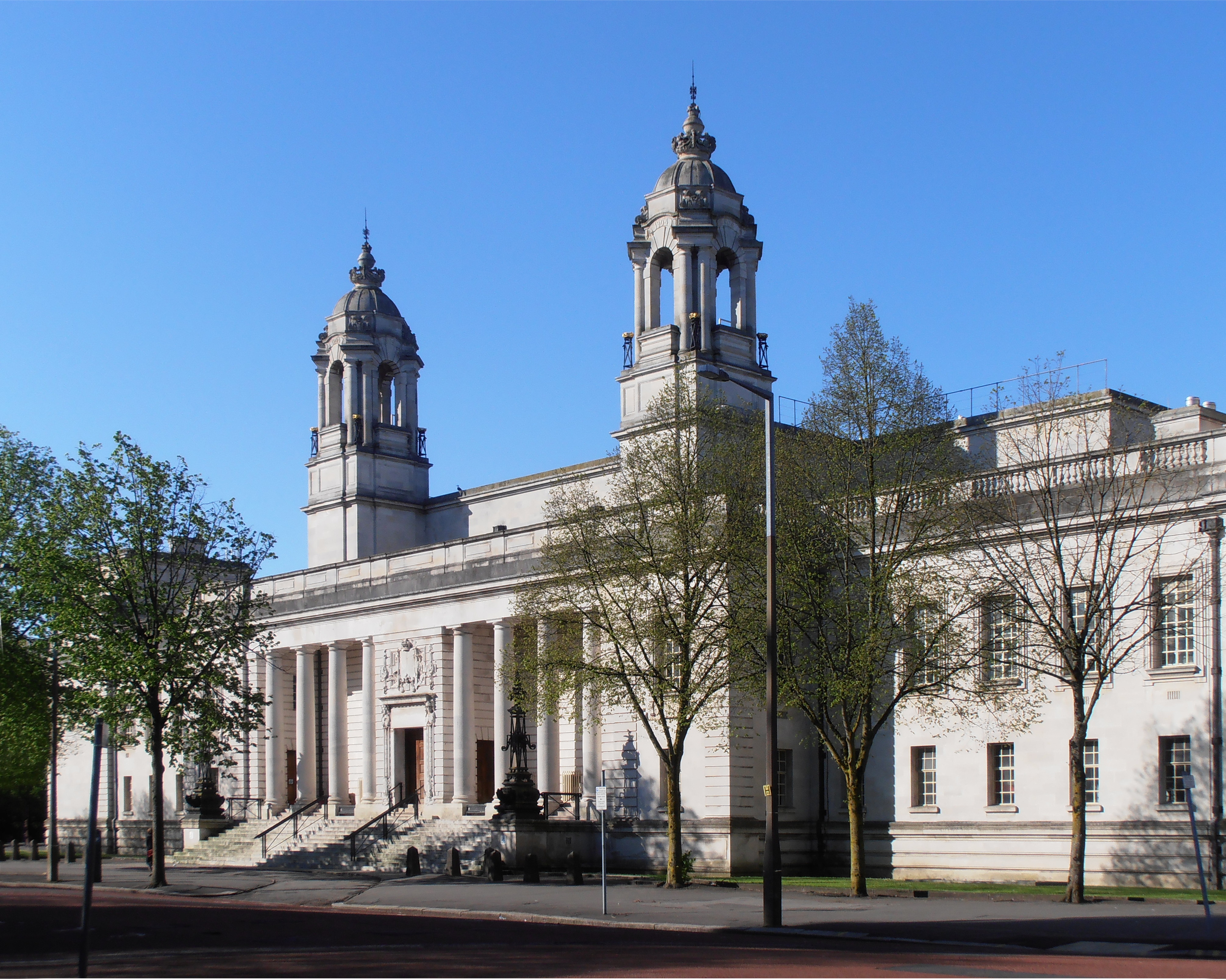
Law Courts, Cardiff (1901–04)

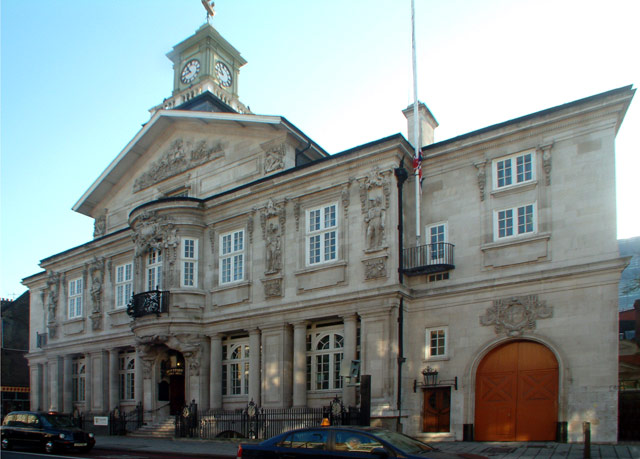
Deptford Town Hall (1902–07)

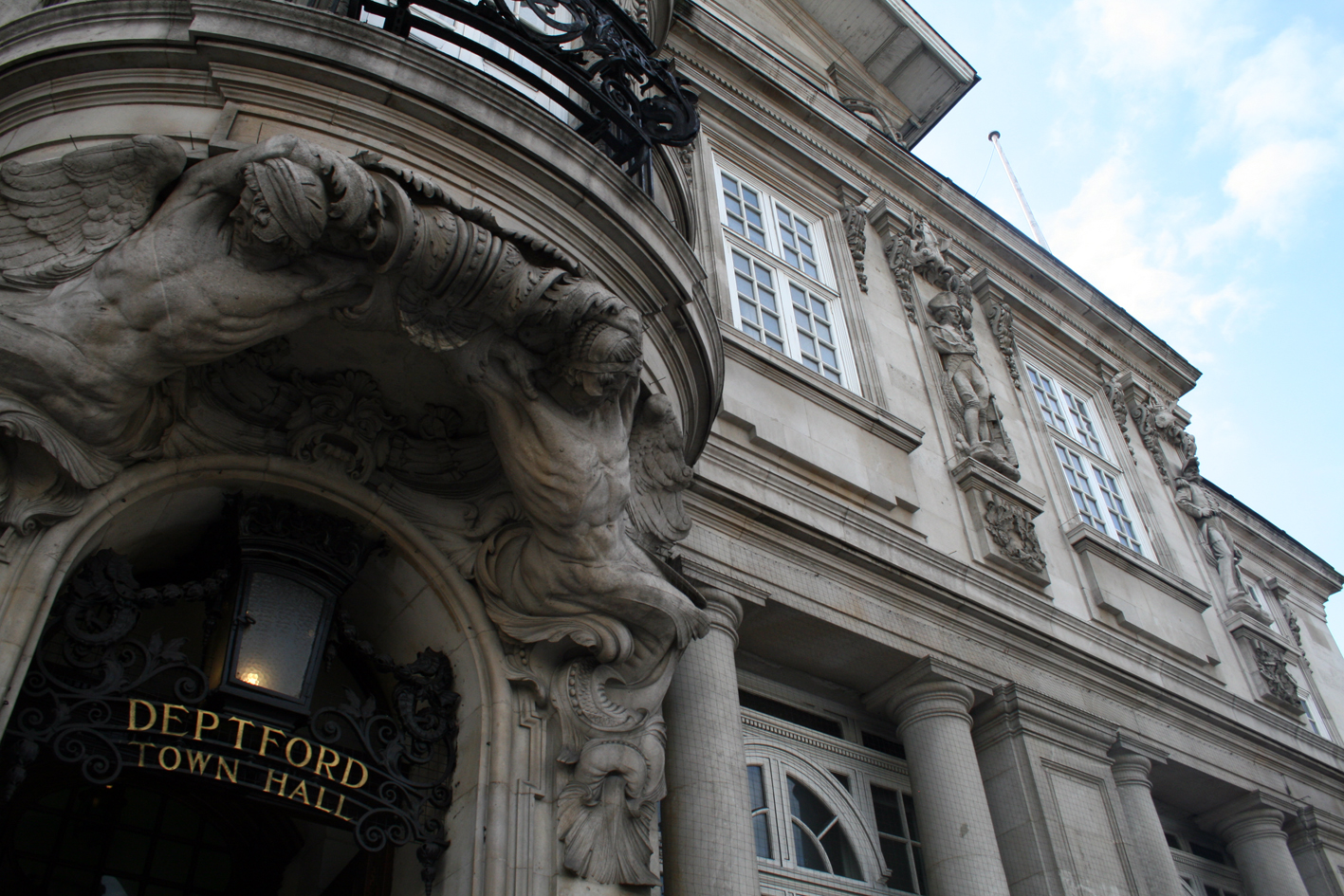
Detail of the facade, Deptford Town Hall (1902–07)

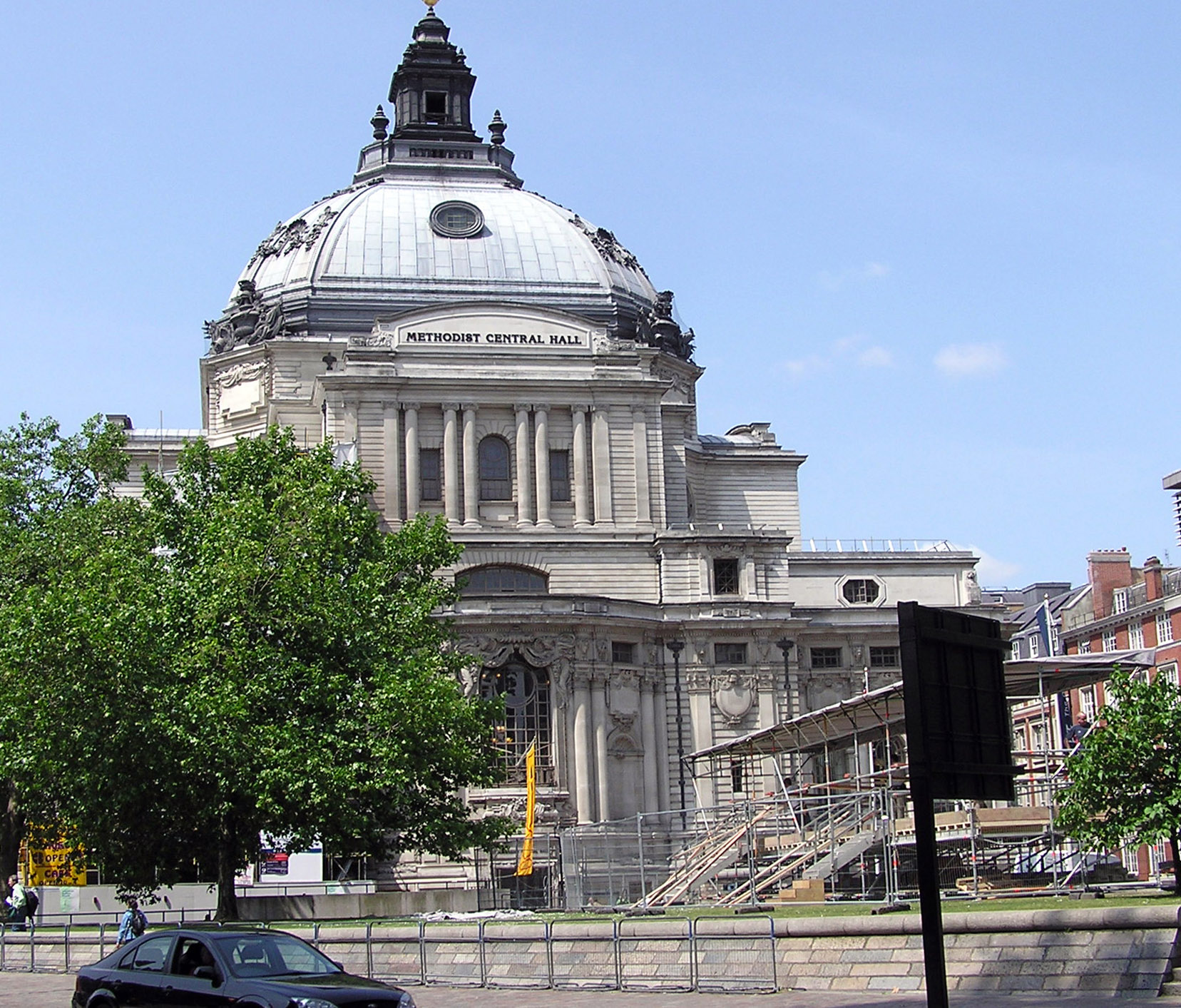
Methodist Central Hall, Westminster (1905–11)

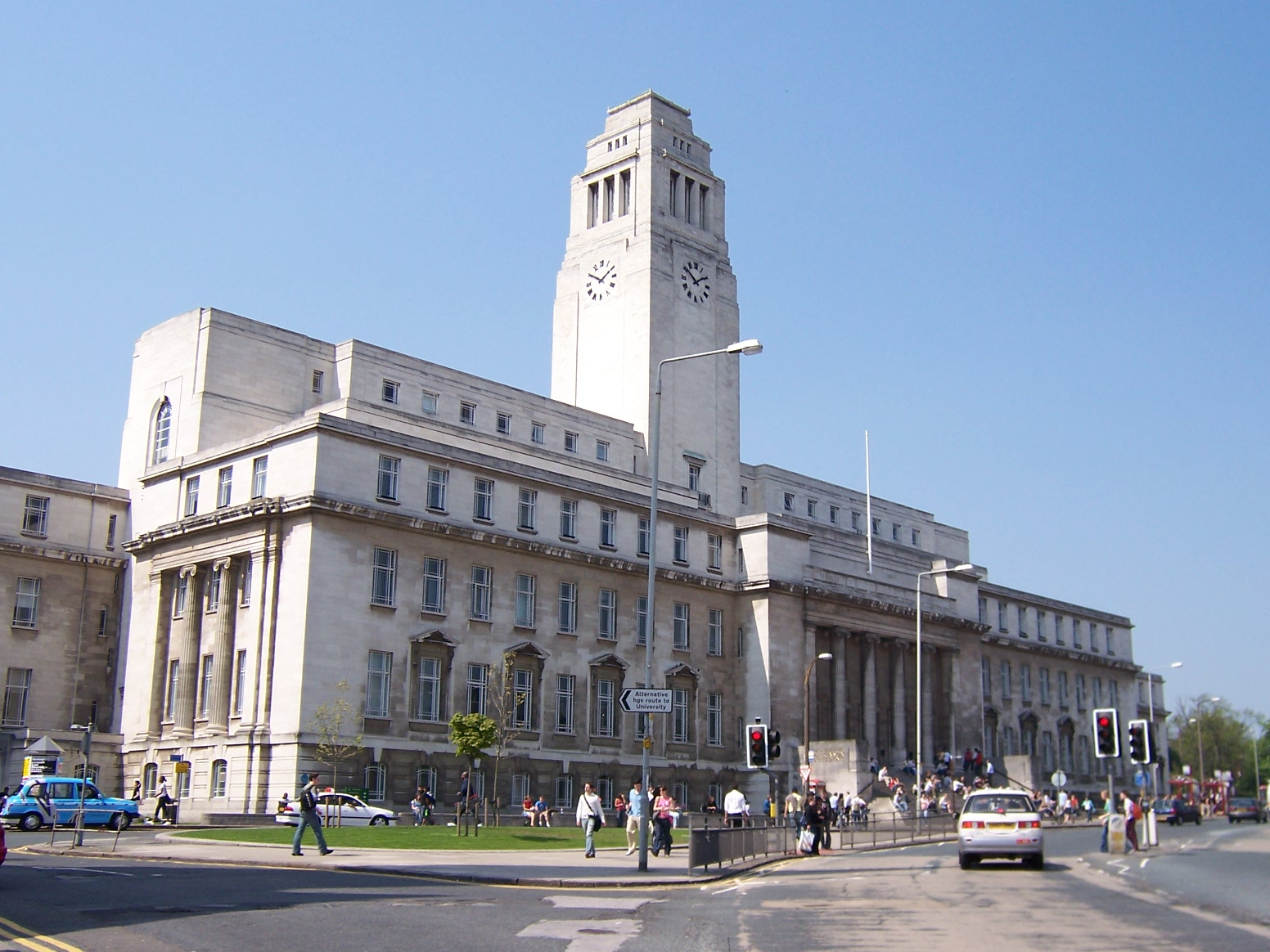
Parkinson Building, Leeds University (1927-1951)

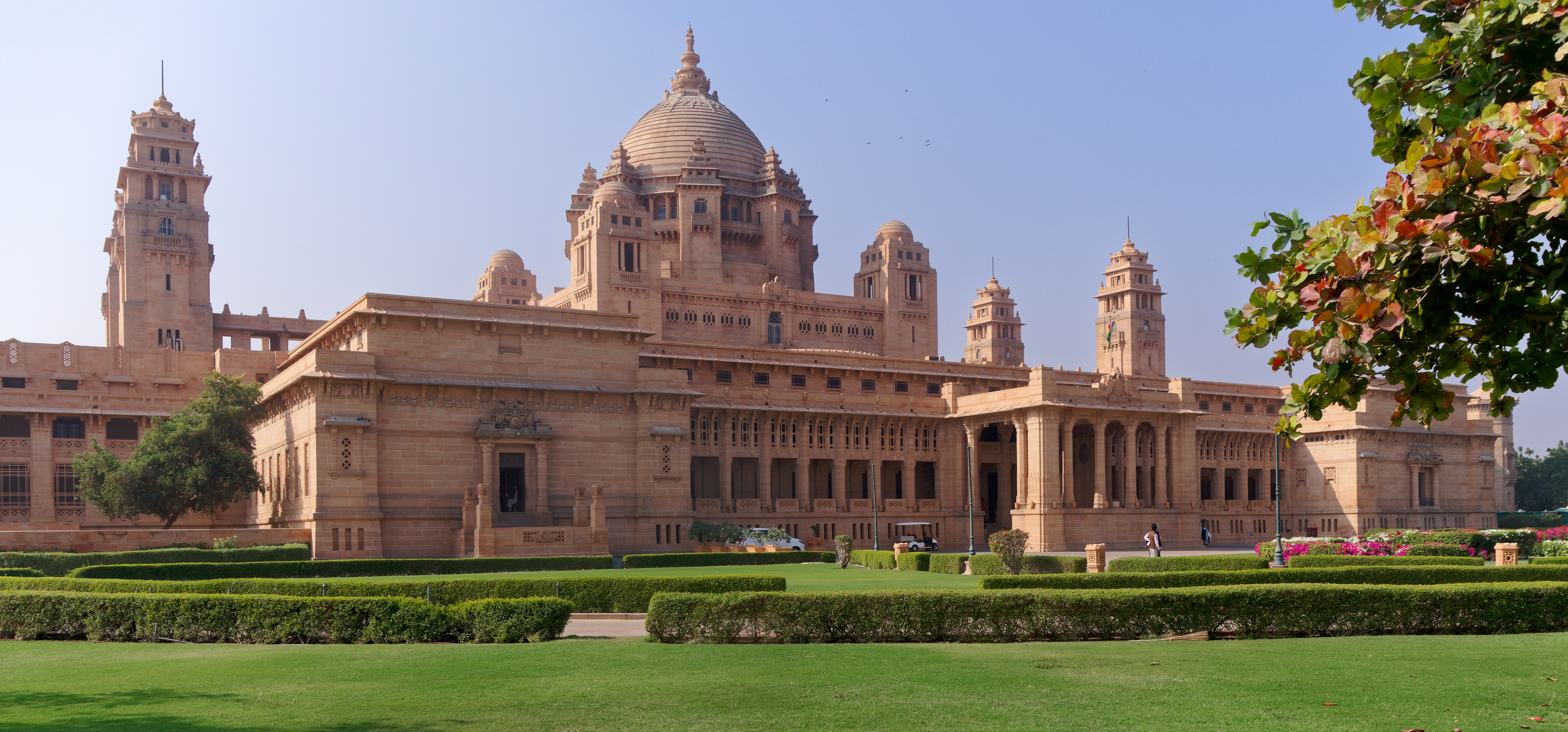
Umaid Bhawan Palace, Jodhpur, India
