= Deptford Town Hall =

Municipal building in London, England

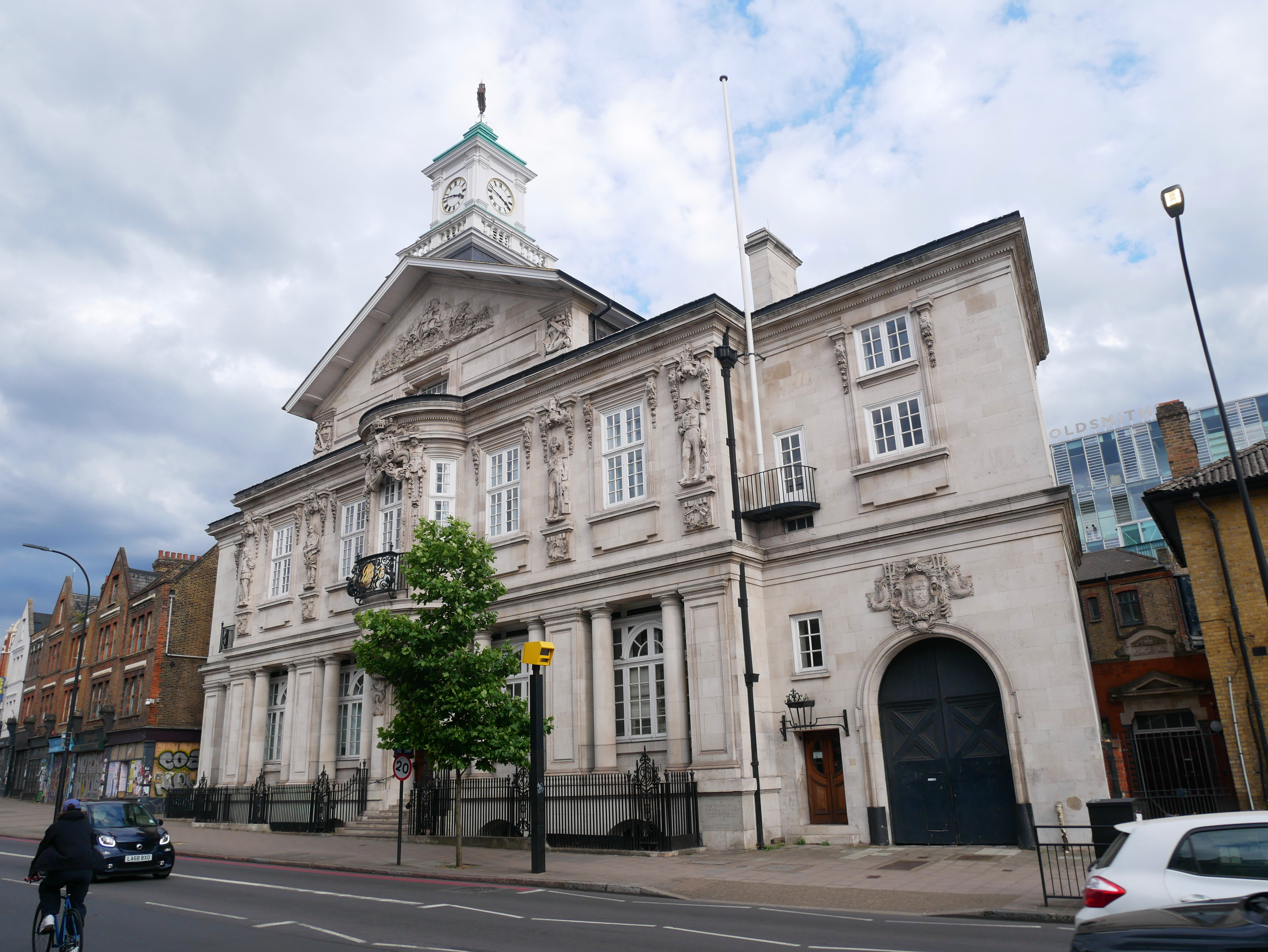
- Deptford Town Hall

- Shown in Lewisham
- 51.4753°N 0.0377°W
- Location: New Cross Road, Deptford

History
- Built: 1905

Site notes
- Architect(s): Henry Vaughan Lanchester, James Stewart and Edwin Alfred Rickards
- Architectural style: Baroque style

Listed Building – Grade II*
- Designated: 23 July 2024
- Reference no.: 1193691

Deptford Town Hall is a municipal building in New Cross Road, Deptford, London. It is a Grade II* listed building and is currently owned and operated by Goldsmiths College. In 1966 the architectural critic Ian Nairn described it as 'The jolliest public building in London'.

== History ==
The building was commissioned to replace the aging vestry hall of St Paul's. The site selected had previously been occupied by a row of residential properties with public baths behind.

The new building was designed by Henry Vaughan Lanchester, James Stewart and Edwin Alfred Rickards in the Baroque style and built by Holloway Brothers; it was officially opened by the mayor, Councillor Joseph Pyne, on 19 July 1905. The design involved a symmetrical main frontage with seven bays facing onto New Cross Road; the central section featured a round arched doorway flanked by figures of Tritons as corbels on the ground floor; there was an oriel window on the first floor with a carved relief of a ship's prow and a pediment containing a tympanum depicting a naval battle above that. Statues of four naval figures, Sir Francis Drake, Robert Blake, Horatio Nelson and an unnamed contemporary admiral, were designed by Henry Poole, and erected on the front of the building at first floor level. A clock tower with a weather vane in the shape of a galleon was erected at roof level. Internally, the principal rooms were the council chamber and the mayor's chamber on the first floor.

During the First World War, the town hall was infamous for holding all its trials of conscientious objectors in secret. This controversial practice was more recently explored in the film, Devils on Horseback, released in 2018.

In the bombing of the Second World War, a V-2 rocket destroyed a Woolworths store on the opposite side of the street killing 160 people in the shop with the blast superficially damaging the town hall itself.

The building was established as the headquarters of the Metropolitan Borough of Deptford but ceased to be the local seat of government when the enlarged London Borough of Lewisham was formed in 1965. It was used as a workspace for some council departments until it was acquired by Goldsmiths College in 2000.

In 2019 there were calls from student campaign groups to remove the naval figure statues due to their connections with colonialism and the Atlantic slave trade. However in June 2022 following a consultation, Goldsmiths announced that the statues would be retained with the addition of plaques explaining their history.

The building was listed at Grade II in 1950 and upgraded to Grade II* in 2024.

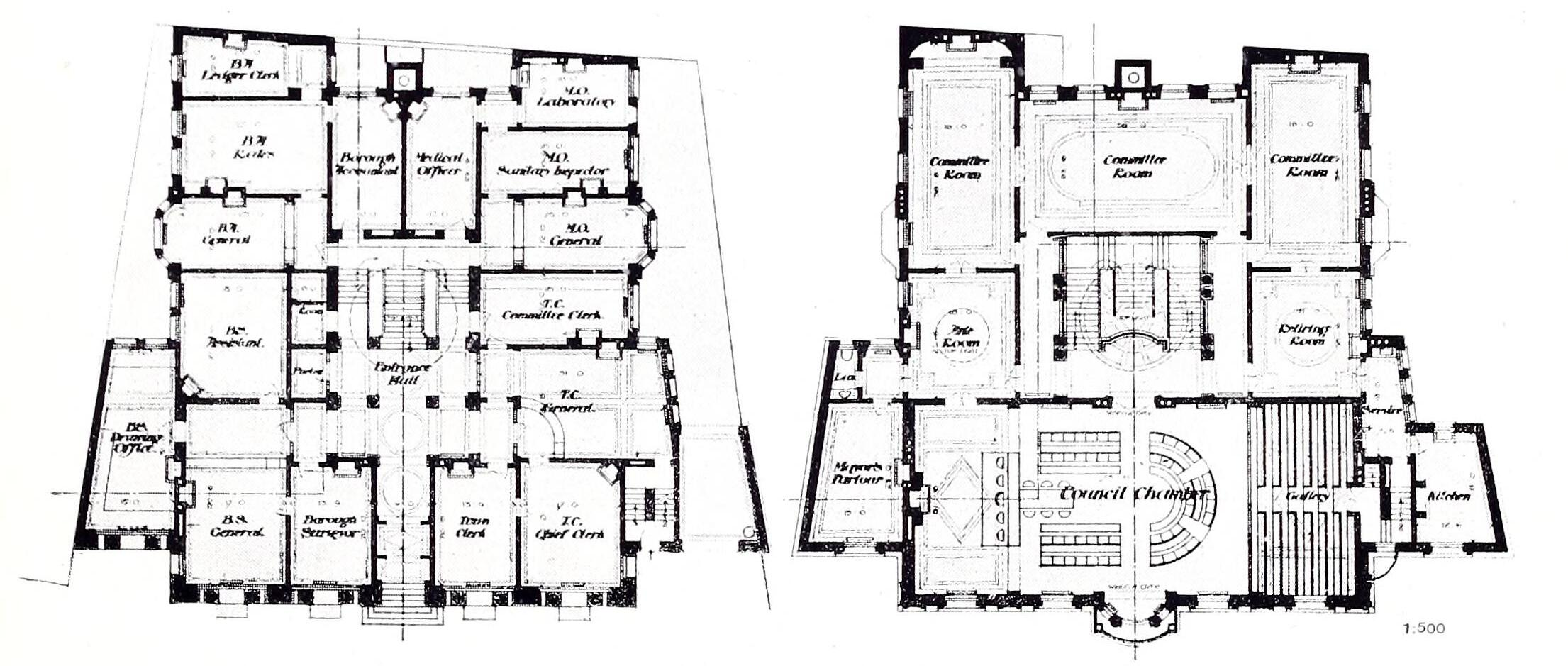
Floorplan
