= One Curzon Street =

Office block in London

Coordinates: 51.507691°N 0.145797°W

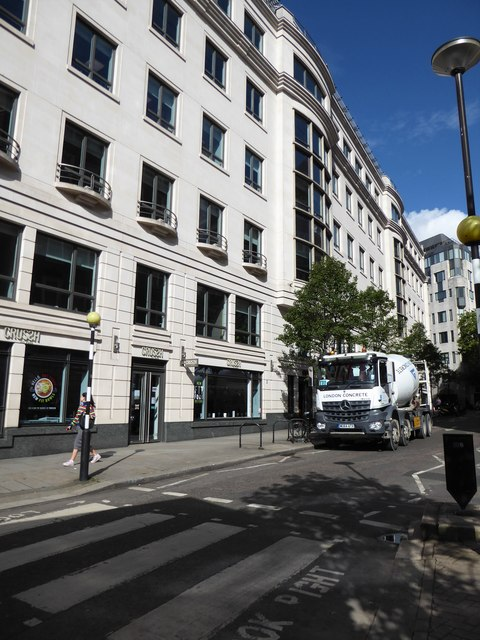
One Curzon Street

One Curzon Street is a large office block on Curzon Street in Mayfair, London. It is known for hosting the offices of a number of financial services companies.

== Description ==
The offices were built between 1995 and 1998 with TP Bennett serving as architects. Built in Portland Stone, the building occupies a triangular plot, with the southern face overlooking Curzon Street long and convex. Its architecture is loosely styled on that of 1930s office designs.

== Tenants ==
The buildings tenants have included the headquarters or London offices of a number of high-profile financial services companies. Among them historically are GLG Partners, UBS, AIG, Rathbones and Houlihan Lokey.

It was AIG's London office in One Curzon Street that played a central role in the near bankruptcy of AIG in 2009, which would lead to their bailout during the 2008 financial crisis. The office was described by reporter Peter Koenig as the "epicenter" of the global financial crisis as a whole.
