= Henry Poole (sculptor) =

British sculptor (1873–1928)

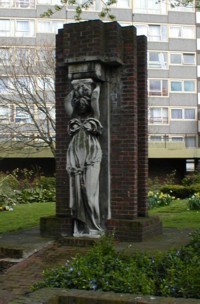
Two Caryatids sculpture by Henry Poole, stood in the New Kent Road.

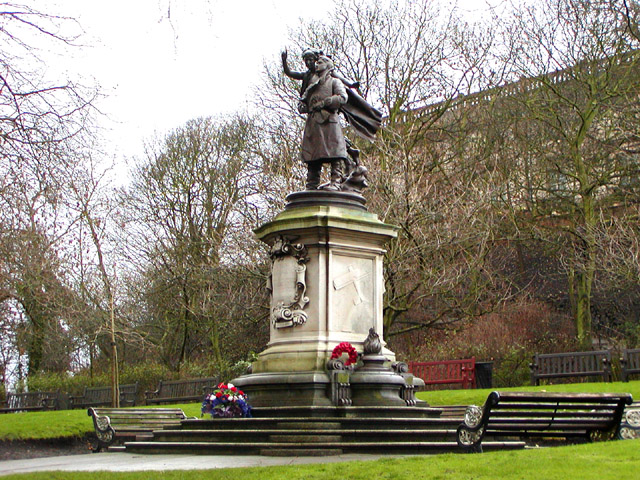
Statue of Captain Albert Ball in the grounds of Nottingham Castle

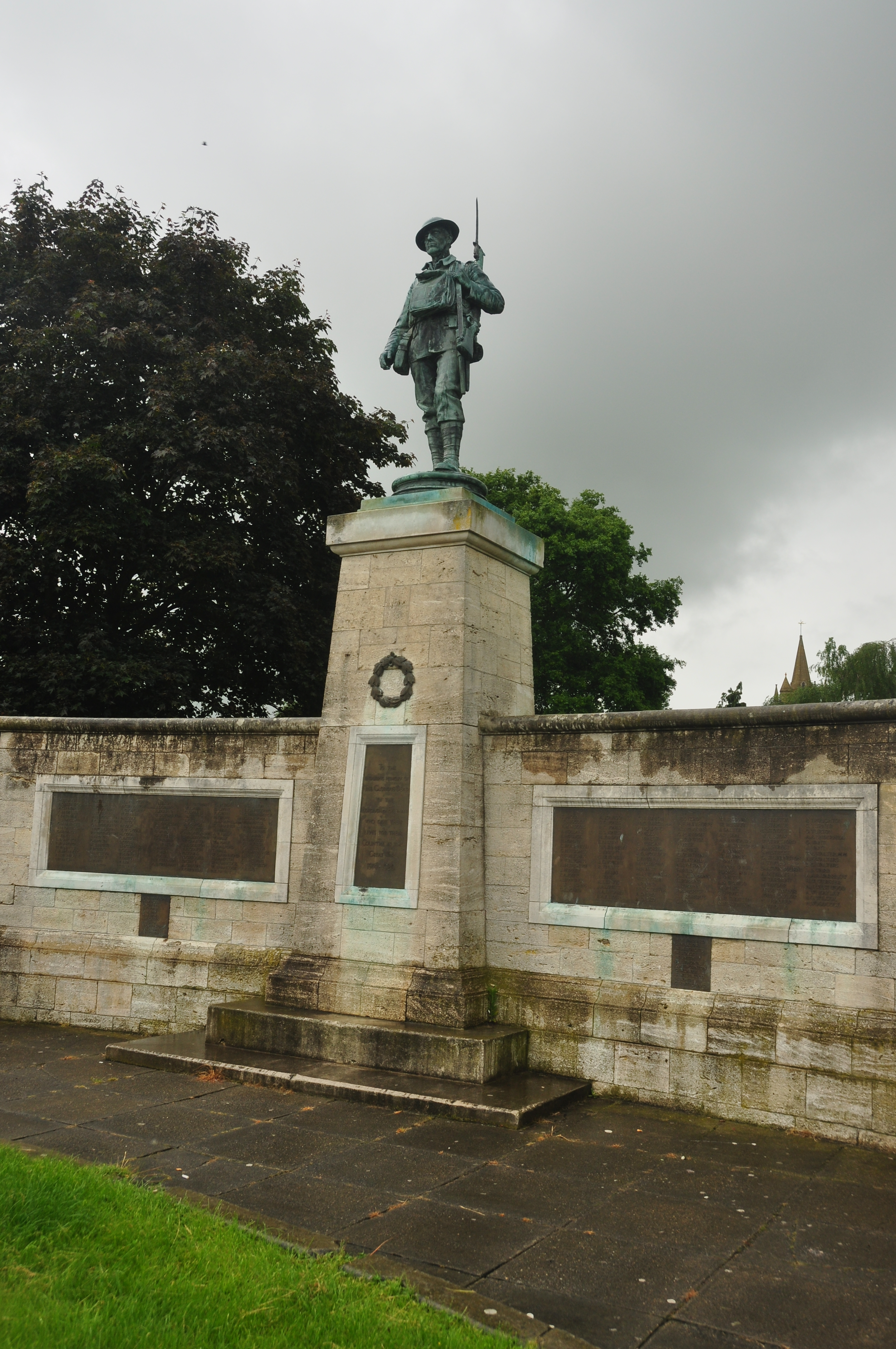
Evesham War Memorial

Henry Poole RA (28 January 1873 — 15 August 1928) was a British architectural sculptor.

He studied at the Lambeth School of Art in 1888; and from 26 January 1892 under Harry Bates ARA and George Frederic Watts RA at the Royal Academy Schools. Poole was elected ARA 22 April 1920 and became a full RA in 1927, shortly before his death. He exhibited at the Royal Academy between 1894 – 1928; and was Master of the Sculpture School from 1921 to 1927.

He worked for the army school of camouflage founded by Solomon Joseph Solomon, at Hyde Park during World War I.

Much of his architectural work has disappeared with the demolition of the buildings it decorated, but some examples survive. The bronze lions commissioned for the entrance of the HSBC Building in Shanghai still survive in the Shanghai History Museum. These were cast by J W Singer & Sons, in Frome, and modern replicas sit in their place outside the building on The Bund. His statue of Edward VII still stands outside the Victoria Rooms in Bristol, and his statue of the fighter pilot Albert Ball is in the grounds of Nottingham Castle. Carved stone works survive at Cardiff City Hall (Giraldus Cambrensis), Deptford Town Hall and Westminster Central Hall. Fragments of his architectural sculptures for the demolished United Kingdom Provident Institution offices are now located on Milford Lane in London.

== Works ==
- Deptford Town Hall (1903)
- Westminster Central Hall (1905–1911)
- Charity, sculpture group above the entrance to the former Bethnal Green Town Hall, (1910)
- Colnaghi's, New Bond Street (1912)
- Relief panels for the Public Library and Baths, Great Smith Street, (1892–1893)
- Edward VII statue and memorial fountains, with Edwin Rickards, Bristol (1912)
- Equestrian statue of Field Marshal Earl Roberts VC, (1916) in Kelvingrove Park, Glasgow, after an original design by Harry Bates
- Sculptures for the Chapel of St Michael and St George, St Paul's Cathedral
- Interior decoration of The Black Friar public house, Queen Victoria Street, London
- Statue of Captain Albert Ball, Nottingham Castle (1921)
- War memorial, Evesham, Worcestershire (1921)
- War memorial, Pudsey, West Yorks (1922)
- War memorial, Wotton-under-Edge, Gloucestershire (1920)
- Chatham Naval Memorial, Kent, with Sir Robert Lorimer, (1924)
- Plymouth Naval Memorial with Sir Robert Lorimer, (1924)
- Portsmouth Naval Memorial, Southsea Common, with Sir Robert Lorimer, (1924)
- Nottingham High School war memorial
