= Curzon Street =

Street in Mayfair, London

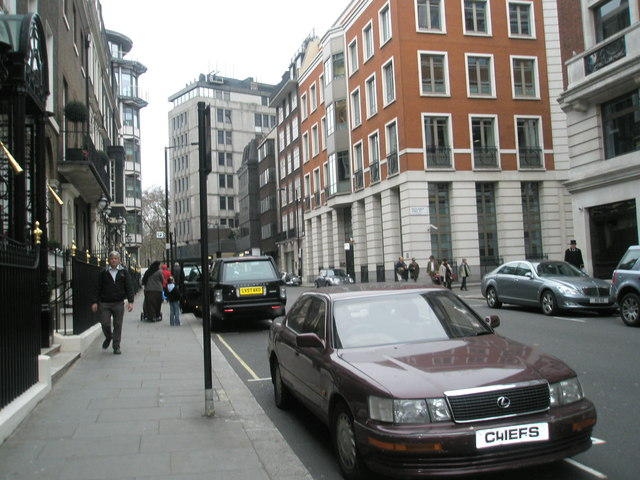
- Looking westward along Curzon Street
- Interactive map of Curzon Street
- Former name: Mayfair Row
- Length: 0.3 mi (0.48 km)
- Postal code: W1
- Nearest Tube station: Green Park
- west end: A4202; 51.5060°N 0.1515°W
- east end: Fitzmaurice Place; 51.5082°N 0.1448°W

Curzon Street is a street in Mayfair, London, within the W1J postcode district, that ranges from Fitzmaurice Place, past Shepherd Market, to Park Lane. It is named after Sir Nathaniel Curzon, 2nd Baronet, who inherited the landholding during 1715. More houses were built there during the 1720s.

== History ==
Curzon Street has been home to notable members of the peerage. Chesterfield House was built there during 1748 for Philip Stanhope, 4th Earl of Chesterfield but was demolished in 1937 when its site was redeveloped as an apartment block. Other residences on Curzon Street included those of Lord Hothfield, the Duke of Grafton, the Earl Verney, Lord Leconfield, Lady Blessington, Alfred de Rothschild, Lord Blythswood and the Earl of Inchcape. Its east contains Crewe House, formerly named Wharncliffe House, that was rebuilt in 1750 and later named after the Countess of Wharncliffe, that is now the Saudi Arabian Embassy.

On the opposite side of the street, until 1894, stood Curzon Chapel (formerly Mayfair Chapel), first erected in 1730. Near to this was the smaller Keith's Chapel, the location before the Marriage Act 1753 of various clandestine marriages, including the marriages of the Duke of Chandos and Mrs Anne Jeffrey in 1744, Lord Strange and Mrs Lucy Smith in 1746, Lord Kensington and Rachel Hill in 1749, Sewellis Shirley and Margaret Rolle, widow of the second Earl of Orford in 1751, the Duke of Hamilton and Miss Gunning in 1752, and of Lord George Bentinck and Mary Davies in 1753.

Other inhabitants of Curzon Street have included Anne Hopkins and Henry Gunnell of Chapel Street (Rate Book 1711-1751) (who were the parents of Henry Robert Gunnell of the House of Commons who married the fashion-desinger Ann Rozea); the art-collector Edward Solly (at No. 7, 1821–44); the Colonial Office expert Colonel Thomas Moody Kt. and his son Wilmot Horton Moody (at No. 13, 1829 - 1849); Benjamin Disraeli (until his death in 1881); Lord Macartney (until his death in 1806); George Selwyn MP (in 1776); Prince Pierre Soltykoff; Richard Robert Madden; and Earl Percy.

Leconfield House, at the corner of South Audley Street with an address on Curzon Street, became the home of the UK security service (known as MI5) in 1945, and remained so until 1976. In May 2020, Robert Tchenguiz submitted plans to Westminster City Council to convert the building into a 65-bedroom private members' hotel. Tchenguiz had bought the building for his Rotch property business in 2004 for about £140 million.

Various activities were also conducted by MI5 at addresses on South Audley Street. In 1978, MI5 also occupied facilities at 1-4 Curzon Street, known as "Curzon Street House", for use by the registry, administration and technical services departments; that site was redeveloped in 1996.

In Chesterfield Gardens, which is a cul-de-sac off Curzon Street, the second home office of the two offshore commercial stations known as Radio Caroline was established during 1964; later that year the sales office of Radio London was opened at number 17 Curzon Street, to be followed across the street at number 32 by the establishment of offices serving Radio England and Britain Radio. The introduction of the Marine, &c., Broadcasting (Offences) Act 1967, which became law after midnight on 14 August 1967, forced the closure of all of these offices.

In the 1970s, American songwriter Harry Nilsson owned a two-bedroomed apartment (number 12) at 9 Curzon Place (now Curzon Square). Both Cass Elliot of the Mamas & the Papas and Keith Moon of the Who died in the flat within four years of each other, each aged 32.

1 Curzon Street is a modern office building. The fifth floor was home to AIG Financial Products, the division that "nearly destroyed" the US insurance company and has been described by reporter Peter Koenig as th e "epicenter" of the 2008 financial crisis.

G. Heywood Hill Ltd., mentioned by Nancy Mitford in her letters, most particularly in those compiled for the book The Bookshop at 10 Curzon Street: Letters between Nancy Mitford and Heywood Hill 1952–73, remains open for trading.

Wynn Mayfair, a prominent casino operated by Wynn Resorts is also located on Curzon Street.
