= E. A. Rickards =

English architect

Edwin Alfred Rickards
- Born: 1872
- Died: 29 August 1920 (aged 47–48); Bournemouth, England
- Occupation: Architect
- Notable work: Methodist Central Hall
- Style: Baroque

Edwin Alfred Rickards FRIBA (1872–1920) was an English architect.

== Early life ==
Rickards was born in Chelsea in 1872. In 1887, Rickards was articled to Richard John Lovell, and attended both the Royal Academy Schools in London and attended classes at the Architectural Association.

== Career ==
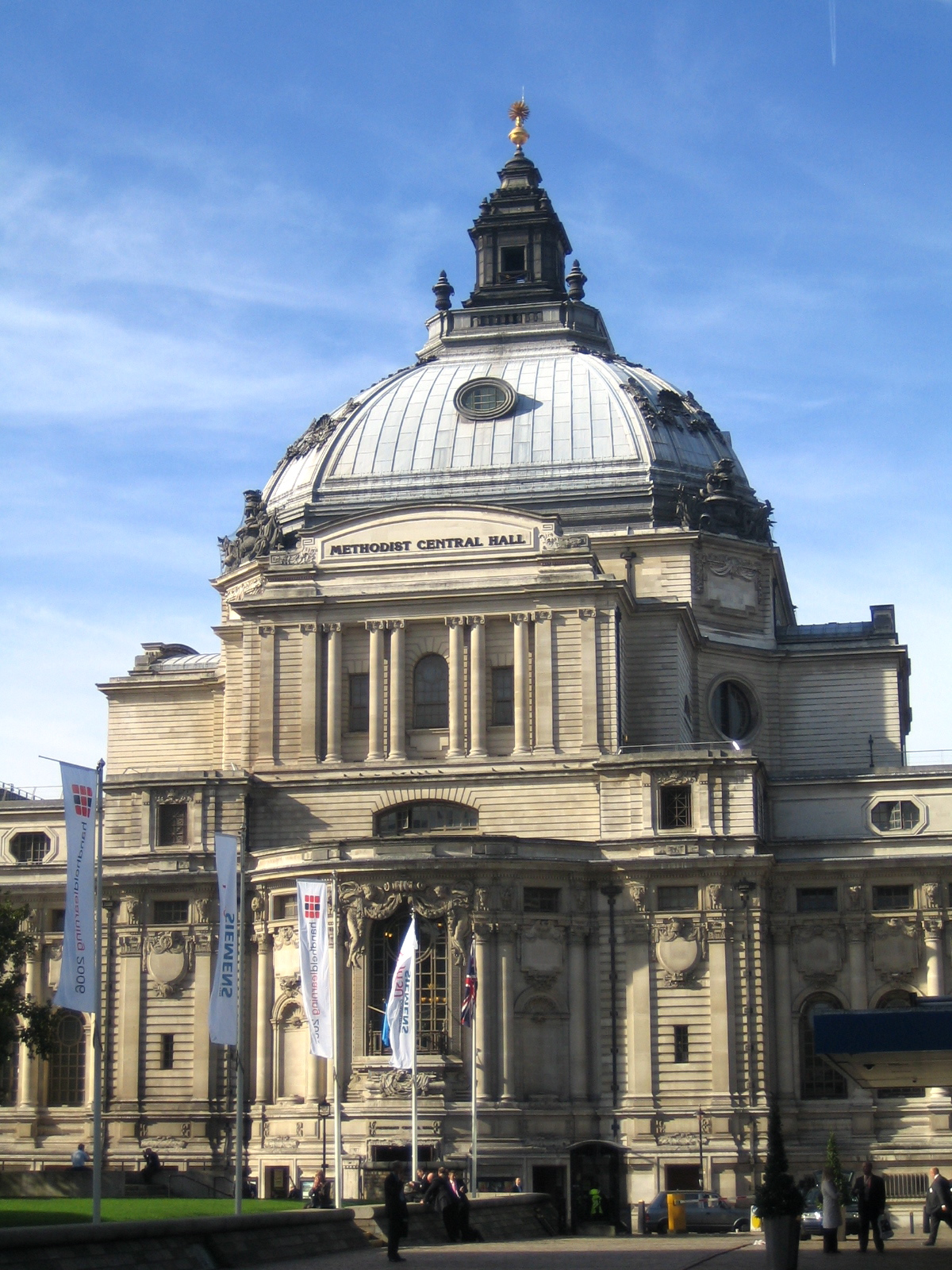
Methodist Central Hall in Westminster, London

In 1889 he joined Eedle & Meyers as an assistant before moving into a work as an assistant for a variety of architects. This included George Campbell Sherrin, where he designed the lantern for Sherrin's dome at the Brompton Oratory in 1894. Rickards qualified in 1896 and went into partnership with architects Henry Vaughan Lanchester and James Stewart. Rickards was elected to the Art Workers' Guild in 1904, and as a fellow of the Royal Institute of British Architects in 1906. He specialized in baroque architecture. He designed the Methodist Central Hall in Westminster, London, in 1907.

Rickards's portrait was painted by Frank Waldo Murray.

Rickards designed the Great Britain pavilion at the Venice Biennale (1909).

== Death and legacy ==
Rickards died on 29 August 1920. He appeared as a fictional character in Arnold Bennett's 1918 novel The Roll-Call.
