= Berdmore =

Berdmore is a surname and may refer one of the following individuals:

- Samuel Berdmore (died 1742/3), English clergyman
- Samuel Berdmore (schoolmaster) (1739–1802), English headmaster
- Scrope Berdmore (1708–1770), English clergyman
- Scrope Berdmore (academic) (1744–1814), English academic, Warden of Merton College, Oxford
- Thomas Berdmore (c.1740–1785), English dentist to King George III

== See also ==
- Berdmore's Ground Squirrel (Menetes berdmorei), a ground squirrel found in Southeast Asia.
