= Samuel Berdmore (schoolmaster) =

Samuel Berdmore D.D.
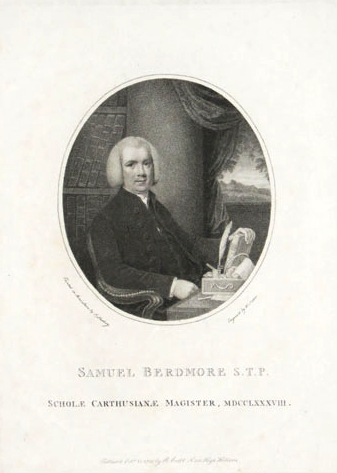
- Samuel Berdmore, 1788 engraving
- Born: May 29, 1739; Nottingham
- Died: January 20, 1802 (aged 62); Southampton Row, London
- Occupations: cleric, schoolmaster, and author, master of Charterhouse

Samuel Berdmore D.D. (29 May 1739 – 20 January 1802) was an English cleric, schoolmaster, and author, master of Charterhouse School from 1769.

== Early life ==
He was the son of the Rev. Thomas Berdmore and his wife Mary, born in Nottingham on 29 May 1739; Thomas Berdmore the dentist was his brother, and left him a legacy on his death in 1785, at age 45. Their father was vicar of St Mary's Church, Nottingham, and died in 1743, succeeded there by Scrope Berdmore, son of Samuel Berdmore.

Berdmore received his education as a foundation scholar at Charterhouse School, from 1749. He matriculated as a sizar at Jesus College, Cambridge in 1755, graduating B.A. in 1759 as the second wrangler, was elected a Fellow of the college, and proceeded to the degree of M.A. in 1762. Around 1763, the year in which he took orders as a deacon, he was an usher teaching Latin at Nottingham Free School. That year he became vicar of Whittlesford near Cambridge, holding the living to 1771.

== Charterhouse School ==
Berdmore was elected master of Charterhouse School in 1769, succeeding Lewis Crusius, and being the first Charterhouse scholarship boy to rise to the position. Under the school's system his title was Schoolmaster, the Master being separately appointed: on a vacancy in 1778, William Ramsden was brought in as Master over Berdmore's head. The school was in London's Charterhouse Square, and had initially about two dozen boarders.

Archbishop Frederick Cornwallis conferred on Berdmore a Lambeth degree of D.D. 7 June 1773. He resigned the post in 1791. He was succeeded by Matthew Raine, Charles Burney being one of the unsuccessful candidates. Burney had been at Charterhouse from 1768, aged 10, and after an early misdemeanour at Cambridge hoped to improve his current position, head of a school at Hammersmith. Berdmore was writing to him, from 1790. Burney contacted Francis Wollaston, who had been at Charterhouse with him, in 1786. Francis Wollaston the elder, a resident of Charterhouse Square, answered making plain that the past was not forgotten.

== Associations ==
John Timbs in his Club Life of London placed Berdmore, who "abounded in anecdote", in the group who met in the box corner of the Chapter Coffee-House off Paternoster Row, some way south of the school. He is associated there with Joseph Towers and John Walker the lexicographer.

Berdmore was a member of the Unincreasable Club that met in the Queen's Head pub in Holborn; its members included the painter George Romney. Other members were William Long, Daniel Braithwaite FRS and George Nicol. An associate of Isaac Reed, both at the Unincreasable Club, and as a writer for the European Magazine edited by Reed, Berdmore appears in Reed's diary, dining on one occasion at Richard Farmer's house and encountering there another Shakespearean scholar, Edmond Malone.

A poem "My Club" published in 1795 included Berdmore with a group of the friends of Samuel Rogers, then a fashionable poet. Others mentioned were John Gillies, William Marsden, James Rennell and William Seward.

== Later life ==
Berdmore died at his house, in Southampton Row, London, on 20 January 1802, and was buried in the London Charterhouse on 30 January.

== Works ==
Berdmore wrote a book of literary criticism, Specimens of Literary Resemblance in the works of Pope, Gray, and other celebrated writers; with critical observations: in a series of letters, London, 1801. It was addressed to the Rev. Peter Forster, rector of Hedenham, Norfolk, a contemporary at Jesus College,. Henry Meen, a contemporary, saw it as a vehicle for attacks on Thomas Gray, Richard Hurd, William Warburton and others.

In 1800, a year before the publication of the Specimens of Literary Resemblance, Berdmore wrote under the pseudonym "O. P. C." an article for the European Magazine, "Observations on the Two Pindaric Odes of Gray". In this fashion Berdmore involved himself in discussion of Gray's Pindaric Odes in particular, siding with Gilbert Wakefield, whom he had taught at Nottingham, against Samuel Johnson's comments. The Monthly Review took the book to be mounting an assault on Hurd's theory in Discourse on Imitation (1751). The Critical Review gave as an example of Berdmore's method the parallel found between a sermon by Samuel Ogden and a passage in Xenophon.

Berdmore edited Lusus Poetici ex ludo literario apud Ædes Carthusianas Londini. Quibus accessere orationes binæ in Suttoni laudem in Ædibus Carthusianis habitæ, 1791. It consisted of school orations in Latin. One of those dwelled on the case of Edward Law, 1st Baron Ellenborough, a Charterhouse foundation scholar who became a Governor of the school.

== Family ==
Berdmore married in 1769 Maria Matthews, at St Philip's, Birmingham. They had a son Thomas (bapt. 1773), who was admitted to Lincoln's Inn in 1795.
