= John Pennington =

John Pennington may refer to:

- John Pennington, 1st Baron Muncaster (c. 1740–1813), British peer and Tory politician
- John L. Pennington (1829–1900), American newspaper publisher, politician, and the fifth Governor of Dakota Territory
- John Penington, or Pennington, (c.1584–1646) English naval officer
- John Pennington, 3rd Baronet, British Member of Parliament for Cumberland
- John Kenneth Pennington (1927–2011), priest, lecturer of St Mary's Church, Nottingham and Sheriff of Nottingham 1982-1983
- John Pennington (politician) (1870–1945), Australian politician
