= Nathan Haines (priest) =

English priest

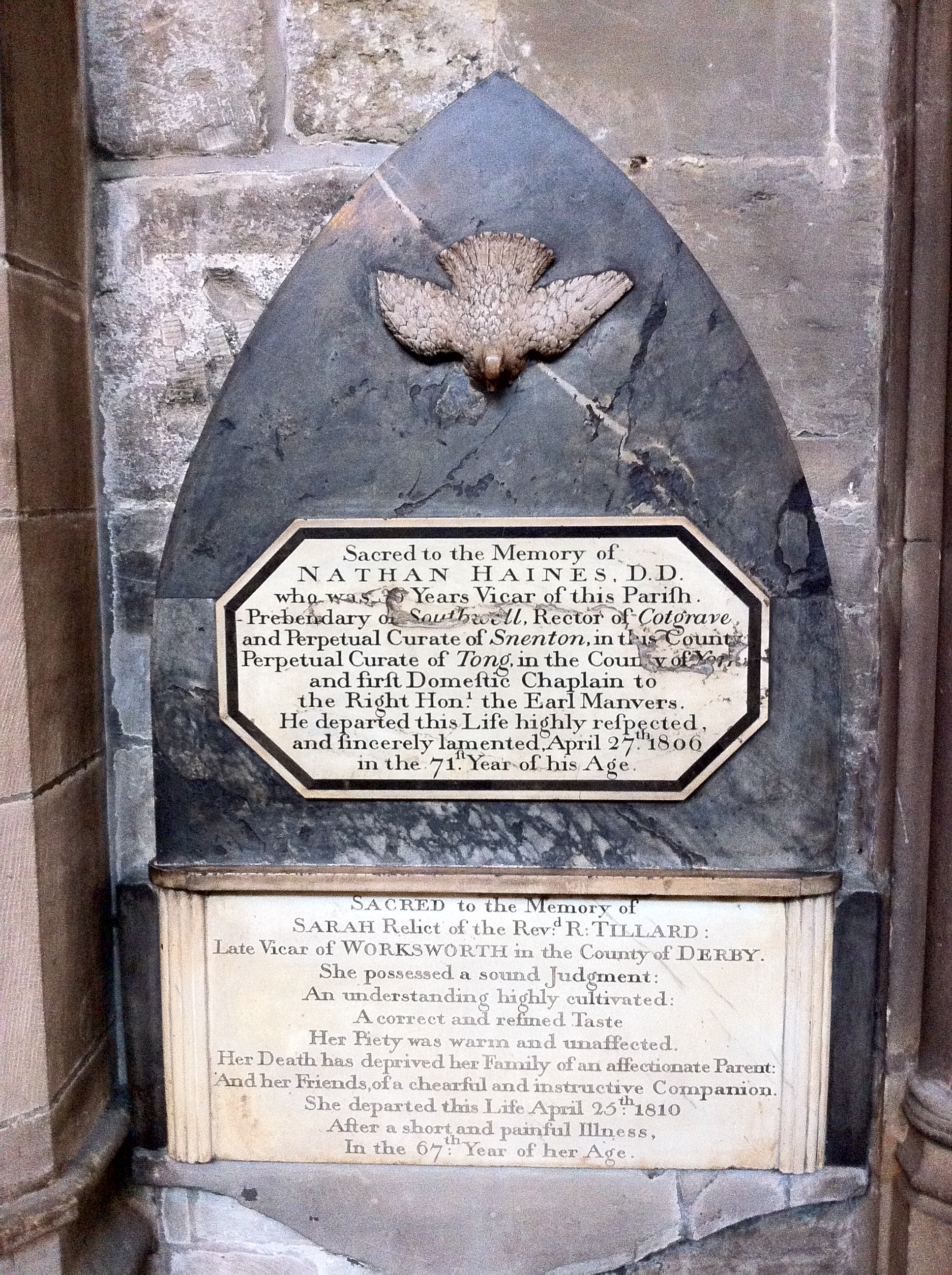
Memorial to Nathan Haines in St Mary's Church, Nottingham

Nathan Haines (c.1735/6 – 27 April 1806) was an English priest who was vicar of St Mary's Church, Nottingham.

== Family ==
Nathan Haines came from Dorset, the son of the Rev. John Haines of Cattistock. At 16, he matriculated at Pembroke College, Oxford. He earned his BA in 1755, MA in 1758, and a bachelor's of divinity and a doctorate of divinity in 1786.

His first wife was Susannah Chudleigh, daughter of George Chudleigh, and they were married at Cattistock, Dorset, England on 23 August 1766. There were three surviving children from this union, Hugh Chudleigh, Elizabeth, and Jane. In 1788, Jane married Rev. Hon. Charles Redlynch Fox-Strangways, son of Stephen Fox-Strangways, 1st Earl of Ilchester.

Susannah's cousin was the infamous Elizabeth Pierrepont, Duchess of Kingston-upon-Hull (née Chudleigh). The Pierrepont family had bought the living of St. Mary's in 1616, and this connection possibly secured Haines the living in 1770.

After Susannah's death, on 25 September 1780 at Tong, Yorkshire, he married Anne Tempest, daughter of Captain John Tempest of the 10th Royal Hussars and granddaughter of Sir George Tempest, 2nd Baronet. Nathan and Anne had one surviving child, Nathan Tempest Haines.

== Career ==
Haines was ordained in 1761 and became vicar of St. Mary's Church, Nottingham on 24 March 1770 a position he held until he died.

He was also Rector of Weston, 1770–1797, Curate of Holme Pierrepont, Nottinghamshire 1772–1799, Prebendary of Southwell 1788–1806, Perpetual Curate of Tong, Yorkshire 1789–1806, Domestic Chaplain to Viscount Newark (later Earl Manvers) 1796 - 1806, Rector of Cotgrave, Nottinghamshire 1797–1806.

Although Nottingham was a strong dissenting town, relationships between Anglicans and Dissenters were largely cordial; many dissenters attending chapel and receiving communion in their parish church. It was widely recognised that the poor of the town received more charity from the Anglican clergy than from any of the dissenting ministers.

In 1801, the Nottingham Journal published figures for St. Mary's: 3,872 inhabited houses, 5,312 families, 10,895 males and 11,759 females, giving a parish population of 22,654. This was double the figure in 1770 when Haines took the living.

During Haines' incumbency, the cordial relations between Anglicans and dissenters deteriorated. In 1799, shots were fired through the vicarage bedroom window, "manifestly with a destructive and malicious intent" while Dr and Mrs Haines were asleep in bed. The Vicarage was Washington House, on High Pavement.

In 1800, the Nottingham Journal reported loitering, gaming and other nuisances in the churchyard during divine service. In 1801, the vestry demanded the restoration of the right to elect one of the churchwardens, and "during this time some highly reprehensible irregularities were committed in the church". The election of a sexton in 1805 turned into a party-political affair with the parading of rival banners. By 1806, the year of Haines' death, railings were erected around the churchyard with lockable gates and the age-old footway across the churchyard dug-up and discontinued.

Religious titles
Preceded by Scrope Berdmore	Vicar of St.Mary's Church, Nottingham; 1770–1806	Succeeded by John Bristow
