= John Richardson (Archdeacon of Nottingham) =

English Anglican archdeacon (1849–1924)

John Gray Richardson (1849–1924) was a priest in the Church of England.

== Family ==
Richardson was the son of Samuel B. Richardson of Sheffield. He studied at Trinity College, Cambridge and graduated in 1872. He was ordained in the Church of England in 1875 and vicar of Monks Kirby, Warwickshire, St. John the Evangelist, Darlington and then St. Mary's Church, Nottingham. He was appointed rural dean of Nottingham in 1886 and Archdeacon of Nottingham in 1894. He was appointed rector of Southwell Minster in 1900. He died in 1924 at Coombe Fishacre House, Newton Abbot.

Religious titles
Preceded by Francis Morse	Vicar of St.Mary's Church, Nottingham; 1886–1900	Succeeded by Arthur Hamilton Baynes
