= Henry Wilson (architect) =

British architect, jeweller and designer

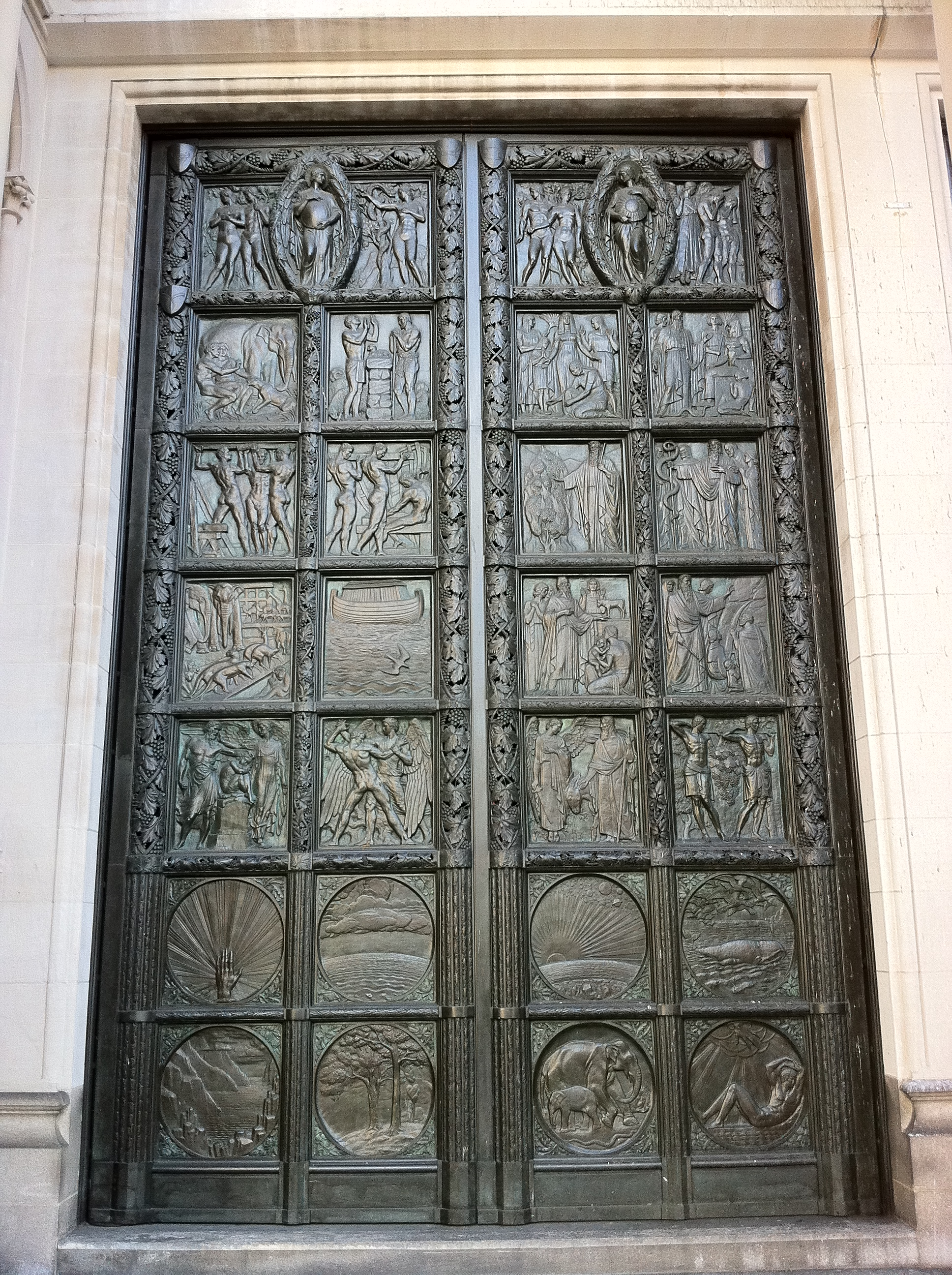
Bronze door at the Cathedral of St. John the Divine, New York

Henry Wilson (12 March 1864 – 7 March 1934) was a British architect, jeweller and designer.

== Career ==
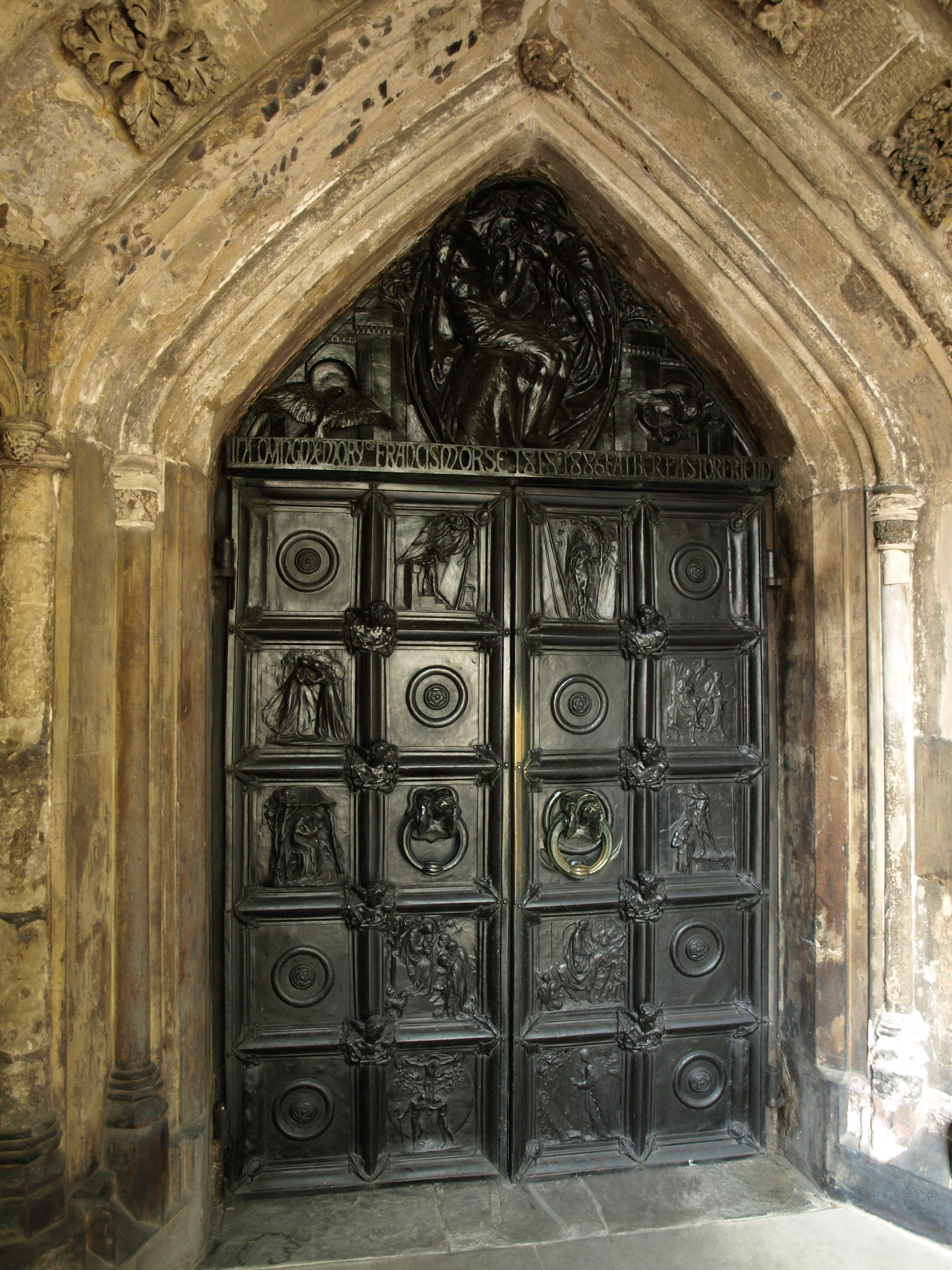
The south porch doors at St. Mary's Church, Nottingham 1904.

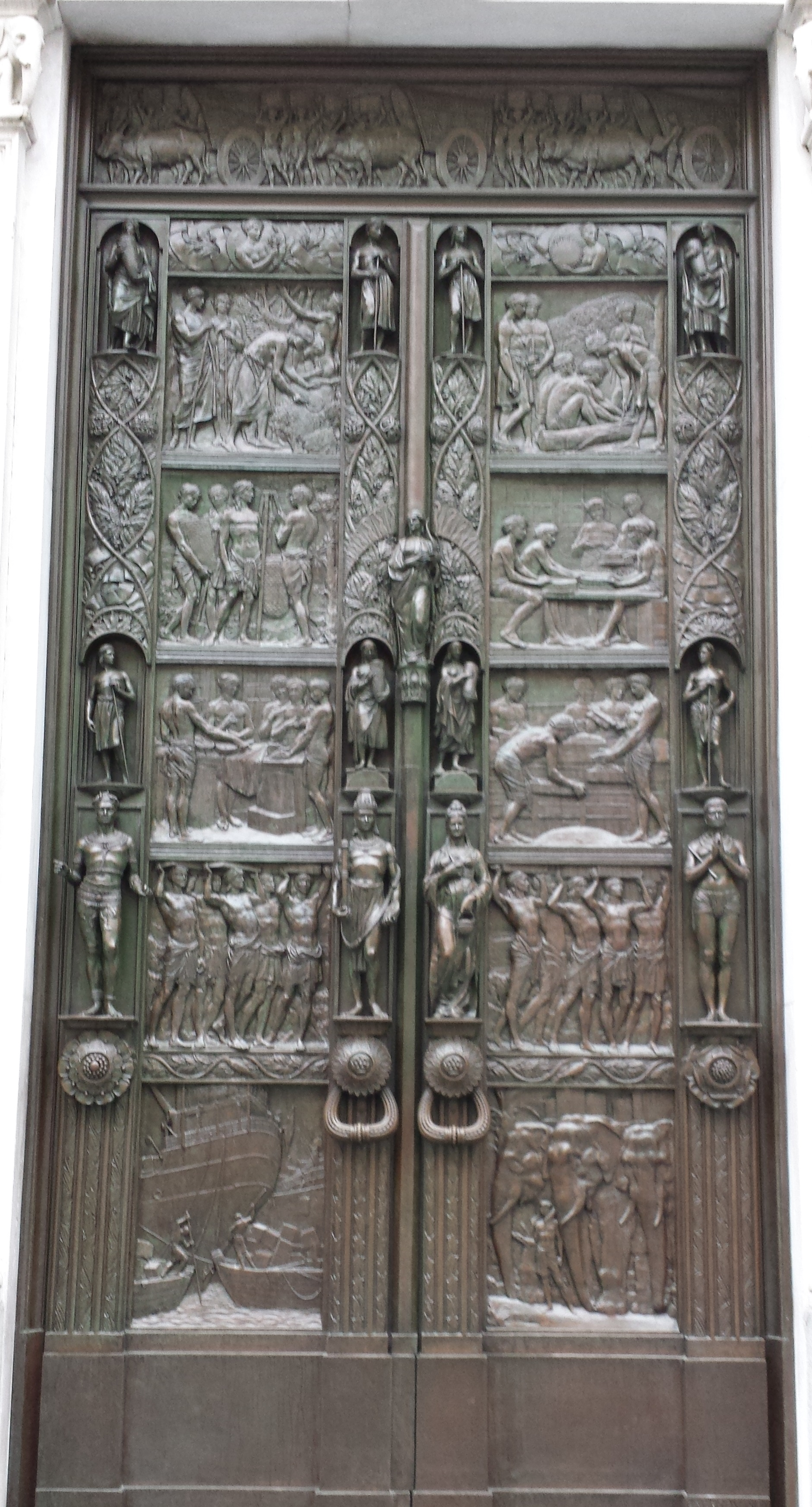
Salada Tea Company, Boston. 1927.

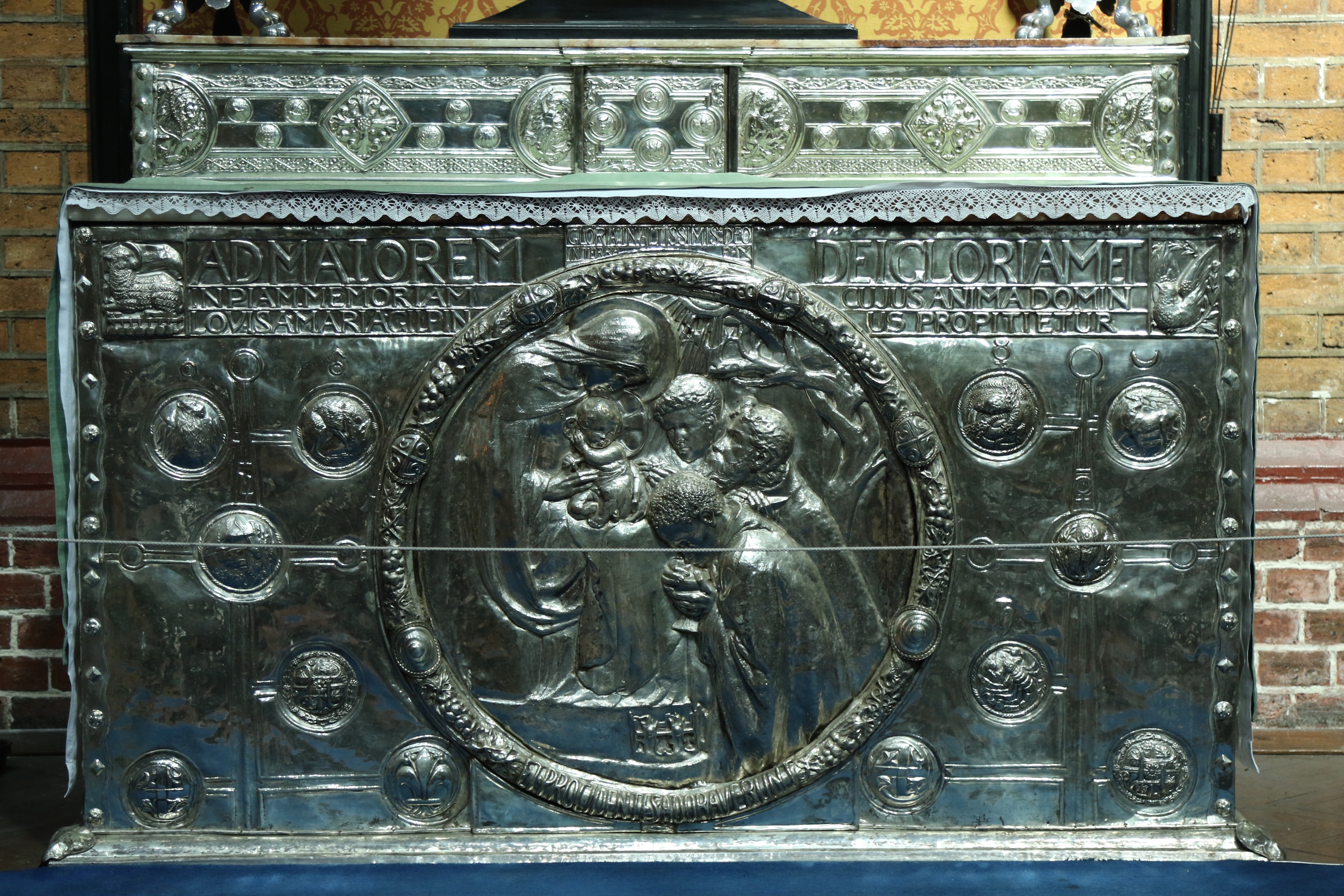
Lady altar at St Bartholomew's Brighton

He was born at 91 Red Rock Street in West Derby near Liverpool on 12 March 1864. He studied at the Kidderminster School of Art before being articled to the architect Edward James Shrewsbury in Maidenhead. He then worked and was trained in the practices of John Oldrid Scott, John Belcher and J. D. Sedding.

After Sedding's death in 1891 Wilson completed many of Sedding's schemes. He followed Sedding's ideals, but his designs were often more original and grander in scale.

From about 1895 Wilson designed metalwork, church plate and furnishings, jewellery and sculpture, becoming a gifted craftsman in the Arts and Crafts Movement. He was in business at 17 Vicarage Gate, Kensington, London from 1896 to 1899. In 1892 he joined the Art Workers Guild.

From 1896 he taught in London at the Central School of Arts and Crafts, and from 1901 taught metalwork at the Royal College of Art. He was the first editor of the Architectural Review, from 1896 to 1901.

In 1902 he became associated with the circle of William Richard Lethaby in the Liverpool Cathedral Scheme. In 1903 his practical manual, Silverwork and Jewellery, was published. In 1905 he designed the bronze doors for the Cathedral of St. John the Divine in New York.

Wilson selected the British jewellery for the Paris Exhibition of 1914. He served as president of the Arts and Crafts Exhibition Society from 1915 to 1922, organised the major Arts and Crafts Exhibition at the Royal Academy in 1916, and in 1917 became Master of the Art Workers Guild. He was a member of the International Society of Sculptors, Painters and Gravers. After World War I, he again selected British jewellery for the Paris Exhibition of 1925.

== Personal life ==
In 1901 he married Margaret Ellinor Morse, the daughter of Francis Morse, Vicar of St. Mary's Church, Nottingham. They had three daughters, Fiammetta, Pernel (later known as the violinist Orrea Pernell, 1906–1993), and Dione (later known as the television chef Dione Lucas) and one son, Guthlac.

In 1922 he emigrated to Paris with his wife, and after her death 1931 he moved to Menton. Wilson died in Menton on 7 March 1934.

== Architectural works ==
- Holy Trinity Sloane Street London, - commissioned to finish the church after Sedding died in 1891
- Welbeck Abbey chapel and library 1890–1896
- Church of Our Most Holy Redeemer, Exmouth Market, Islington, London, 1892–1895
- Public Library, Ladbroke Grove, London, 1891
- St Peter's Church, Ealing, London, 1892
- Douglas Castle, Lanarkshire, - Refitting of chapel, 1894
- Holy Trinity Church, Ilfracombe, lychgate and vestry, 1894
- Church of St Mary the Virgin, Norton Sub Hamdon, Somerset. -Restoration work 1894 and 1904
- St. Clement's Church, Boscombe, Hampshire. 1895
- St Mark's, Brithdir, near Dolgellau, Gwynedd, 1895–1898
- St Bartholomew's Church, Brighton, -Baldacchino 1899–1900, tabernacle door, communion rails, pavement candlesticks, frieze in choir stalls, pulpit, Lady Altar 1902, Octagonal font 1908, wooden gallery 1906.
- All Saints', Kenton, Teignbridge, Devon, -Silver Rood
- Gloucester Cathedral -north transept clock case 1903.
- St. Mary's Church, Nottingham -Bronze doors in south porch. 1904
- Church of St Dyfrig and St Samson, Grangetown, Cardiff, 1904 -reredos
- St Bartholomew's Church, Sydenham, London High altar, reredos and communion rails 1904
- Elphinstone Tomb, King's College, Aberdeen 1912–1926
- Ripon Cathedral pulpit 1913
- Memorial Cross to Frederick Norman, St. Andrew's Churchyard, Much Hadham, Hertfordshire
- Statues of Leofric, Godiva and Justice, Council House, Earls Street Coventry
- Tonbridge School Gate of Remembrance 1918
- Salada Tea Company, Boston, bronze doors. 1927
- Cathedral of St. John the Divine, New York. West end bronze doors. 1927–1931
- St Augustine of Canterbury Church, Highgate, London N6. Lady Chapel 1930.

== Gallery ==
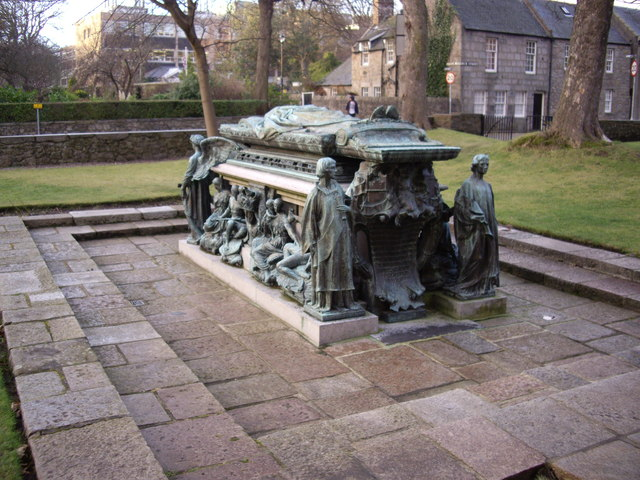
Bishop Elphinstone's tomb, King's College, Aberdeen

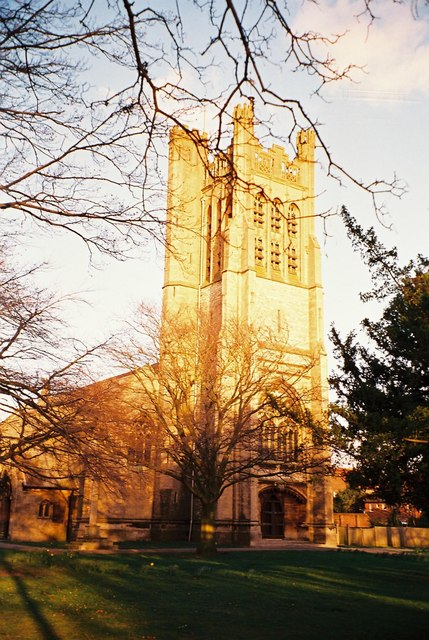
St. Clement's Church, Boscombe

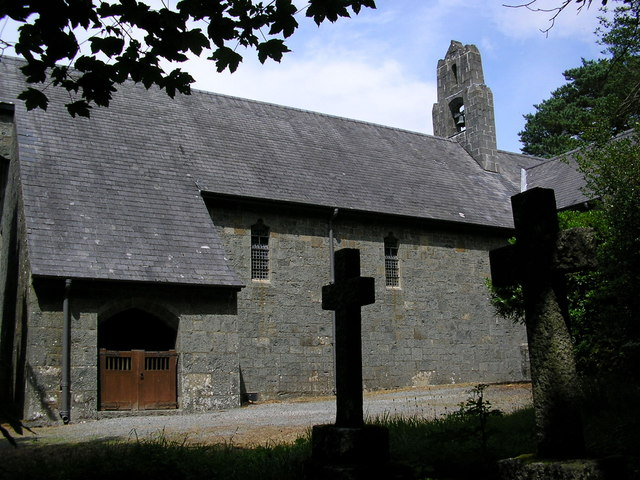
St. Mark's Church, Birthdir

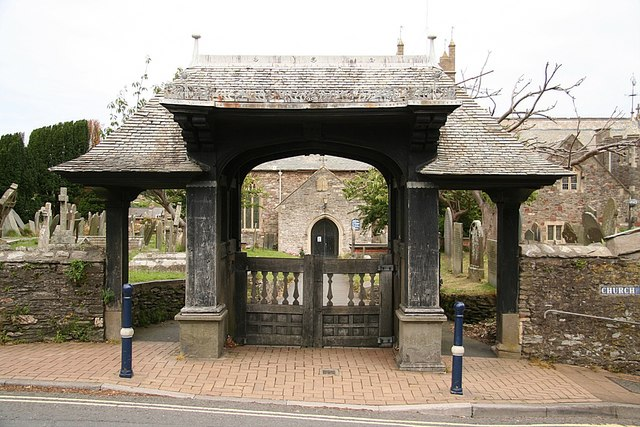
Lych gate at Holy Trinity Church, Ilfracombe

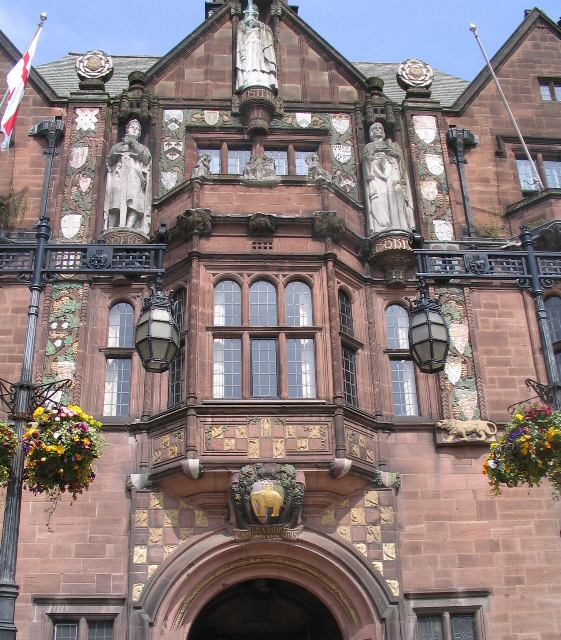
Council House, Earls Street, Coventry

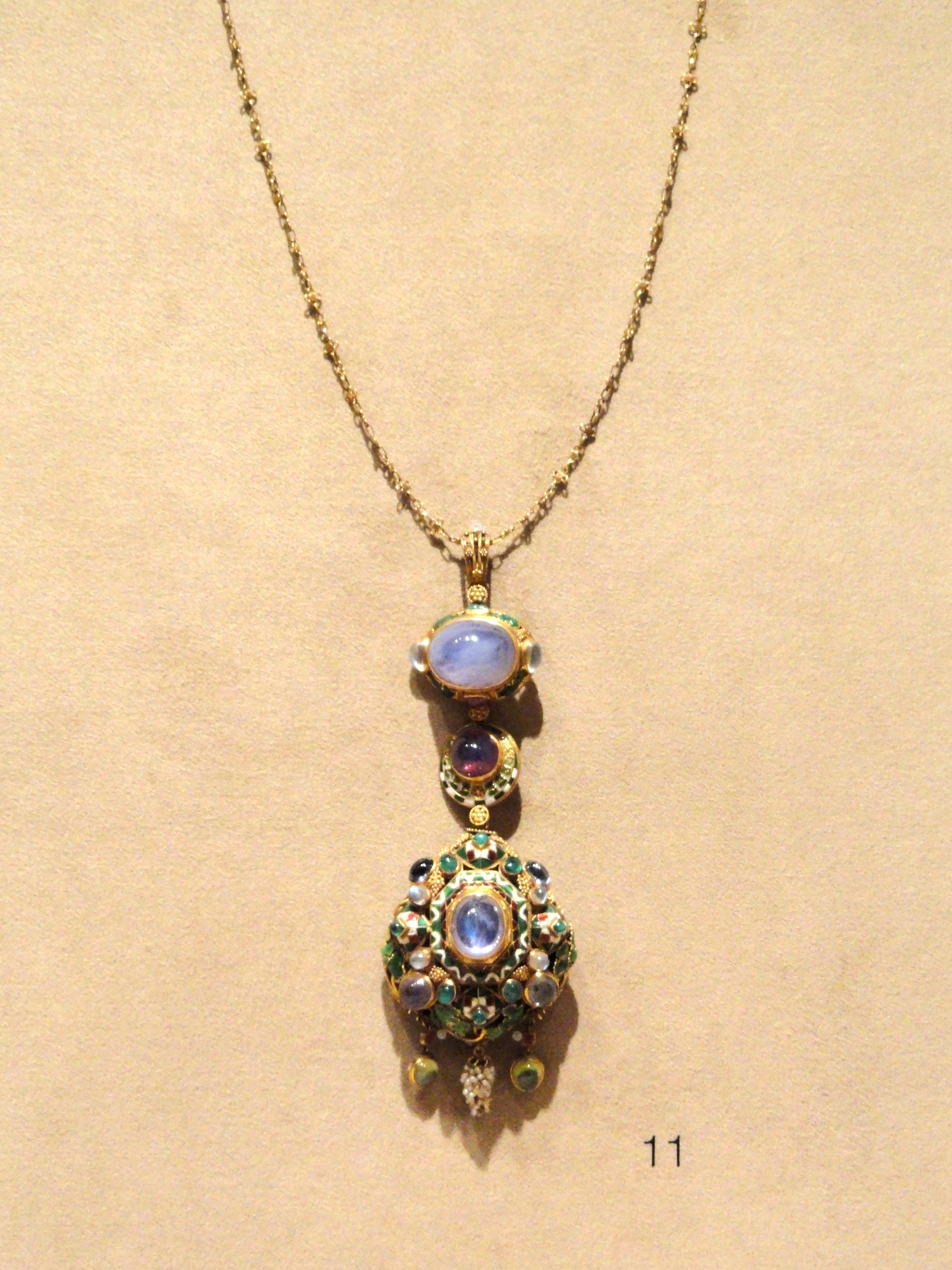
Pendant c. 1908 in the Indianapolis Museum of Art

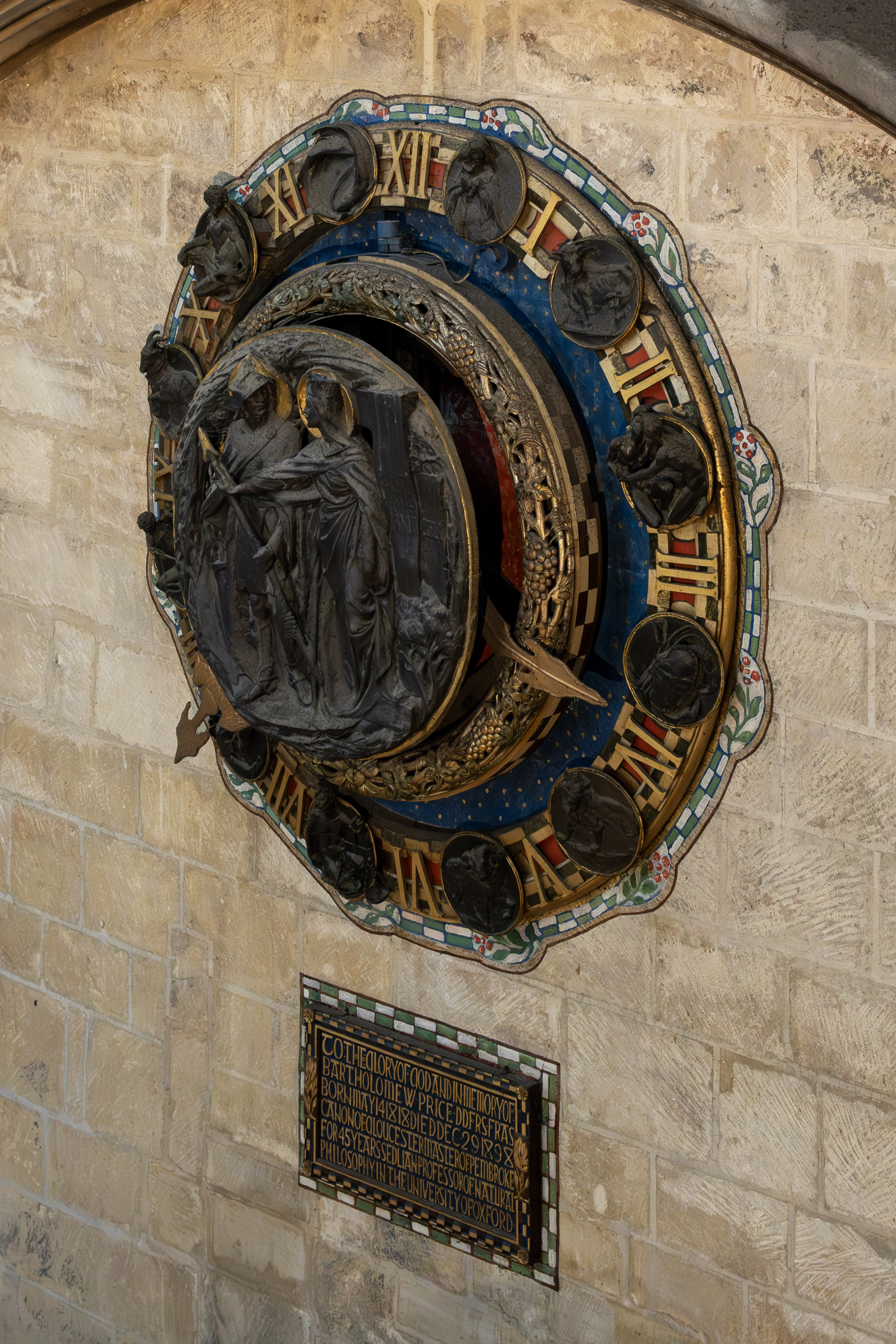
Clock case at Gloucester Cathedral

== Bibliography ==
- Manton, Cyndy. Henry Wilson: Practical Idealist, The Lutterworth Press (2009), ISBN 978-0-7188-3097-7.
- Thomas, John. "The Elphinstone monument at King's College Aberdeen. Its construction in the sixteenth century and reconstruction (1909-31) by Henry Wilson", Aberdeen University Review, Vol. LIV, 4, No. 188 Autumn 1992, pp. 315–333.
- Thomas, John. "The Spirits about the throne. Henry Wilson's Elphinstone monument, Aberdeen", in Happiness, Truth & Holy Images. Essays of Popular Theology and Religion & Art, Wolverhampton, Twin Books, 2019, pp. 51–56.
