= Francis Morse =

Francis Morse, M.A. (18 May 1818 – 18 September 1886) was a priest in the Church of England.

== Family ==
Francis Morse was the son of Thomas Morse and Elizabeth of Blundeston, Suffolk. He was educated at Shrewsbury School and St John's College, Cambridge.

He married Clarissa Catharine Gedge on 3 January 1849 in St. Philip's Church, Birmingham, (now St. Philip's Cathedral, Birmingham). Children were:

- Catherine Elizabeth Morse (1850–1936) (married Rev. Hon. William Edward Bowen)
- Clara Morse (b. 1851)
- Edward St John Morse (1852–1941) (vicar of St. Peter and St. Paul's Church, Shelford from 1882 – 1940)
- Sydney Morse (1 Jun 1854 – 27 Jan 1929)
- Harold Morse (b. 1860)
- Harriet Emily Morse (b. 1864)
- Winifred Mary Morse (b. 1868)
- Margaret Ellinor Morse (1870–1931) (married Henry Wilson (architect and designer)
- Frances Hilda Morse (b. 1873)

== Career ==
He was admitted as a deacon by Rt. Revd. Edward Stanley Bishop of Norwich in January 1844 and ordained in 1845 and was a curate in the Church of St Editha, Tamworth in 1849. There was some controversy in 1853 when he was proposed for the St Mary's Church, Shrewsbury by the Edward Herbert, 3rd Earl of Powis but a court case ensued to prevent him from taking the incumbency.

He was appointed a perpetual curate of St. John's Church, Ladywood, Birmingham in 1854. On 23 December 1864 he became Vicar of St. Mary's Church, Nottingham, a position he held until 1884. He was also a prebendary of Lincoln from 1867 - 1884. On his retirement he was made Canon of Southwell Minster.

At St. Mary's Church, Nottingham, Francis Morse introduced a modern style of management. He printed annual reports and Vestry minutes start with his arrival. The church supported both The Society for the Propagation of the Gospel and the Church Missionary Society.

Sydney Pierrepont, 3rd Earl Manvers supported Morse and was Vicar's warden throughout the incumbency. The fabric of the church underwent continual restoration. After 20 years, Morse is thought to have raised and spent £18,000 on the interior alone, re-roofing the aisles and transepts, and redesigning the chancel. Apart from the organ of 1871 (which was removed in 1915) the chancel stalls, bishop's throne, reredos, altar, sedilla and rood-screen are all from this date and still extant.

Religious titles
Preceded by Joshua William Brooks	Vicar of St.Mary's Church, Nottingham; 1864–1884	Succeeded by John Gray Richardson
