= Douglas Feaver =

British Anglican bishop

Douglas Russell Feaver (1914–1997) was the Bishop of Peterborough in the Church of England from 1972 to 1984.

Feaver was educated at Bristol Grammar School and Keble College, Oxford; and ordained in 1938. He was a curate at St Alban's Abbey then a wartime chaplain in the RAFVR. He later became Sub-Dean of the abbey, Rural Dean of Nottingham (and Vicar of St Mary's) before becoming Peterborough's Bishop.

Church of England titles
Preceded by Cyril Eastaugh	Bishop of Peterborough; 1972–1984	Succeeded by William John Westwood
Preceded by Robert Henry Hawkins	Vicar of St Mary's Church, Nottingham; 1958–1972	Succeeded by Michael James Jackson
