= Robert Aldridge (priest) =

English clergyman (1544 – 1616)

Robert Aldridge (1544 – 1616) was an English clergyman.

== Life ==
Born at Burnham in Buckinghamshire in 1544, Robert Aldridge was educated at Eton and King's College, Cambridge, where he was a Fellow from 1564 to 1567. From 1576 to 1616 he was Rector of Wollaton 1576–1616, and from 1 May 1578 to 1616 Vicar of St Mary's Church, Nottingham. He was the last Vicar of St Mary's Nottingham to have the Crown as patron until 1973. It was in 1598, during the incumbency of Robert Aldridge, that the Crown sold the patronage of St Mary's to Sir Henry Pierrepont.

On 26 July 1592, Thomas Clerke, of Nottingham, faced a charge in the Archdeaconry court, hee is presented for fightinge in the church with Robert Whitcombe. On 29 July he appeared and answered that upon a sondaie a fourtnight or three weekes sins in the church of saint Marie this respondent and others were ringinge of the belles and then and there this respondent did take a possie of flowers from Roberte Whitecombe the sextone, which Whitcombe demaunded them, and he denieinge to restore them the said sexton spake to him thus: thou shalt have my lief before thou have theim. and with that the sexton pulled this respondentes hat over his head and gave him a blowe on the eare with his hand. Whereuppon this jurate resisted him and others cominge upon theim at whose hand hee feared hurte, hee drawe his dagger and with it strake the sexton over the arme because he held him this jurate by the bosome and would not let him go. And then the judge, accepting this confession, as he was and is bound, pronounced the said Clerke to have ipso facto incurred the sentence of excommunication by virtue of the statue in that case provided. Then Mr Gymney, by virtue of order of the judge, absolved the said Thomas Clarke from the sentence of excommunication pronounced on account of his contempt of court.

John Darrell, of Queens' College, Cambridge, was appointed by Robert Aldridge as curate. Darrell already had a reputation for being involved in cases of exorcism. Before long, he was involved again, this time in the case of William Sommers, who suffered from fits, or, as Darrell claimed, demonic possession. Darrell was accused of fraudulent exorcism and removed from his position by John Whitgift, Archbishop of Canterbury.

From the archdeaconry court records for 2 August 1606, William Little Feere and Marmaduke Gregorie, churchwardens of St Mary's Church, Nottingham were warned to see that the church of St. Mary, Nottingham was duly decorated in due form with the sentences of the Holy Scriptures before Michaelmas.

The churchwardens were also under pressure to repair the chancel, damaged by a storm in 1588. The repairs seem to still be outstanding as late as 1632. There are frequent entries in the Archdeaconry Records and include charges against the Vicar.

From the Churchwardens' Presentment Bills for April 21, 1612. St. Maries in Nott.

- We the Churchwardens, here undernamed, do find that our chancell is in decay, but in whose defaulte we cannot lerne perfitly.
- Item we present Mr. Robte. Alderidg Clarke and our Vicar for selling a grave stone from the chancell.
- Item we present Mr. Robte. Alderidg, for burying nottoris fellons in the chancell.

On the same day in the Archdeaconry Court, a licence was granted to John Sherot to read prayers in St. Mary, Nottingham and to teach children the alphabet (cum licentia ad decendum pueros Abcedarios).

The Register shows that Robert Aldridge was buried in the church, but his memorial has perished.

Church of England titles
Preceded by William Underne	Vicar of St Mary's Church, Nottingham; 1598–1616	Succeeded by Oliver Wytherington
