= Robert Henry Hawkins =

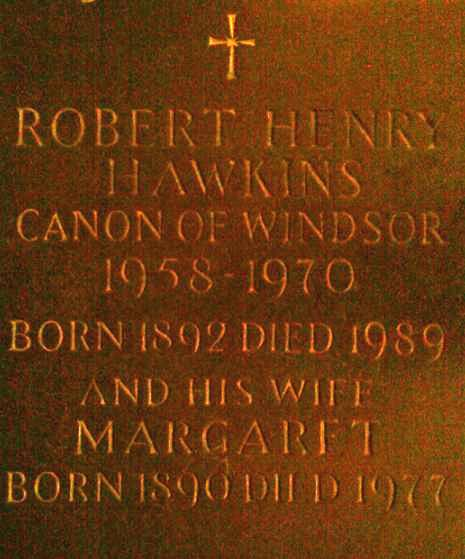
Memorial to Canon Hawkins in St George's Chapel, Windsor Castle

Robert Henry Hawkins (3 March 1892 – 19 September 1989) was a priest of the Church of England and Canon of Windsor.

== Family and education ==
Hawkins was the son of Francis Henry Albert Hawkins (Vicar of All Soul's Clapton Park, Rector of All Saints' Highgate and Prebendary of St Paul's Cathedral London) and Mary Anne Ridley Hawkins.

Hawkins was baptised on 25 March 1892 at All Soul's Clapton Park. He was educated at Forest School (Walthamstow). From 1910, he studied theology at St Edmund Hall, Oxford and graduated in 1913.

In October 1914, Hawkins was commissioned as a Second Lieutenant in the 3rd Battalion, South Staffordshire Regiment and was a Ccptain attached to the Royal Flying Corps by the time of his marriage in 1917. He married Margaret Lacey (1890-1977), daughter of Canon Thomas Alexander Lacey at All Saints' Church, Highgate on 4 June 1917.

Hawkins had five children:

- John C L Hawkins 1918
- Dorothy A Hawkins 1920
- Patricia Hawkins 1923
- Robert A Hawkins 1925
- Margaret S Hawkins 1930

He received a Master of Arts degree in 1919. He was ordained a deacon in 1919 and a priest in 1920.

== Career ==
- Curate of St Thomas' Church, Dudley 1919 - 1923
- Vicar of Maryport with Christ Church 1923 - 1927
- Vicar of St George the Martyr, Barrow in Furness from 1927 - 1934
- Rural Dean of Dalton 1928 - 1934
- Vicar of Dalston with Cumdivock 1934 - 1943
- Vicar of St Mary's Church, Nottingham 1943 - 1958
- Honorary Canon of Southwell Minster 1943 - 1958
- Canon of St George's Chapel, Windsor Castle 1958 – 1970

A memorial to Hawkins is located in the floor of the north choir aisle of St George's Chapel, Windsor Castle.

Religious titles
Preceded by Neville Stuart Talbot	Vicar of St Mary's Church, Nottingham; 1943–1958	Succeeded by Douglas Russell Feaver
