= Cyril Easthaugh =

British Anglican bishop

The Right Reverend Cyril Easthaugh
- Bishop of Peterborough
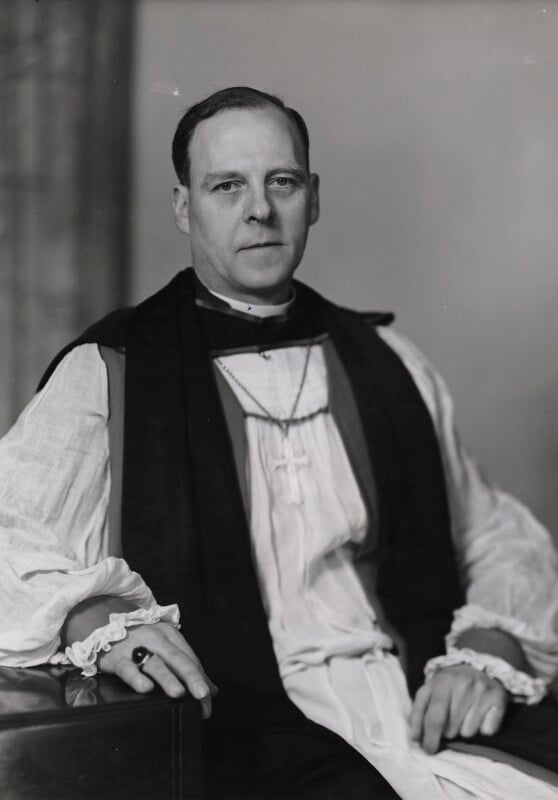
- Easthaugh in 1950
- Diocese: Diocese of Peterborough
- In office: 1961–1972
- Predecessor: Robert Stopford
- Successor: Douglas Feaver
- Other posts: Bishop of Kensington (Diocese of London; 1949–1961)

Orders
- Ordination: 1929 (deacon); 1930 (priest)
- Consecration: 1 November 1949 by Geoffrey Fisher

Personal details
- Born: 22 December 1897 County of London, United Kingdom
- Died: 16 December 1988 (aged 90)
- Spouse: Lady Laura Mary Palmer (m. 1948–1988)
- Children: 3
- Education: Archbishop Tenison's Grammar School; Christ Church, Oxford

Cyril Easthaugh MC (22 December 1897 – 16 December 1988) was a British Anglican bishop in the 20th century. He was Bishop of Kensington from 1949 to 1961 and Bishop of Peterborough from 1961 to 1972.

== Early life and education ==
Easthaugh was born on 22 December 1897 in South London, England. The family name had been changed from Eastaugh to Easthaugh in 1883. Having won a scholarship, he was educated at Archbishop Tenison's Grammar School (now Archbishop Tenison's Church of England School) in London. He left school at 17 to serve in the army during World War I. He was commissioned into the South Staffordshire Regiment. He was awarded the Military Cross (MC) in 1917, at the age of 19.

After the war, he worked in business before feeling the call to the priesthood. He then matriculated into Christ Church, Oxford, to study theology. He graduated with a Bachelor of Arts (BA) degree in 1928; as per tradition, his BA was promoted to a Master of Arts (MA (Oxon)) degree in 1932. In 1928, he entered Cuddesdon College, a Church of England theological college in the Catholic tradition, to train for ordination.

== Ordained ministry ==
Easthaugh was ordained in the Church of England: made a deacon at Michaelmas 1929 (22 September), by Cyril Garbett, Bishop of Southwark, at Southwark Cathedral, and ordained a priest in 1930. He served his curacy at St John the Divine, Kennington, a church in the Catholic tradition of the Church of England. He returned to his theological college (Cuddesdon) to serve as chaplain until 1934. He then served as vice-principal until 1935. He returned to parish ministry and became vicar of St John the Divine, Kennington. He spent fourteen years there, before his consecration to the episcopate in 1949. In 1941, the church building was struck by a bomb during the London Blitz.

On 1 November 1949, he was consecrated a bishop at Westminster Abbey by Geoffrey Fisher, Archbishop of Canterbury. He was appointed Bishop of Kensington, a suffragan bishop in the Diocese of London. From the confirmation of his election to the See in late December 1961, he became the Bishop of Peterborough until his retirement in 1971.

For a decade he continued as chairman of the Christian Evidence Society. He was an opponent of union between the Methodist Church and the Anglican Communion. He was Life President of the Guild of All Souls, an Anglican devotional society.

His churchmanship fell within the Catholic wing of the Church of England and he hoped for the eventual union of Anglicans with the Roman Catholic Church. However, he supported the retention of the peculiar flavour of Catholicism that had developed in England and did not support the Church of England becoming a carbon-copy of continental Roman Catholicism.

== Later life ==
Easthaugh died on 16 December 1988. On 28 January 1989, a Requiem Mass was held for him at St Stephen's, Gloucester Road, London. It was led by Graham Leonard, the then Bishop of London who later entered the Roman Catholic Church. Personal recollection - I was a choir boy at St John’s Hillingdon and the Bishop came to our church to officiate at confirmations. His grandiose and authoritative manner was befitting his position and he was impressively tall, handsome and very well spoken. He drove an elderly Rolls Royce and has left a lasting and pleasant impression.

== Personal life ==
In 1948, Easthaugh married Lady Laura Mary Palmer, the third daughter of the Earl of Selborne. Together, they had three children; one son and two daughters.

Church of England titles
Preceded by Henry Montgomery Campbell	Bishop of Kensington; 1949–1961	Succeeded by Edward Roberts
Preceded by Robert Stopford	Bishop of Peterborough; 1961–1972	Succeeded by Douglas Feaver
