= Alexander Manson (physician) =

Scottish physician

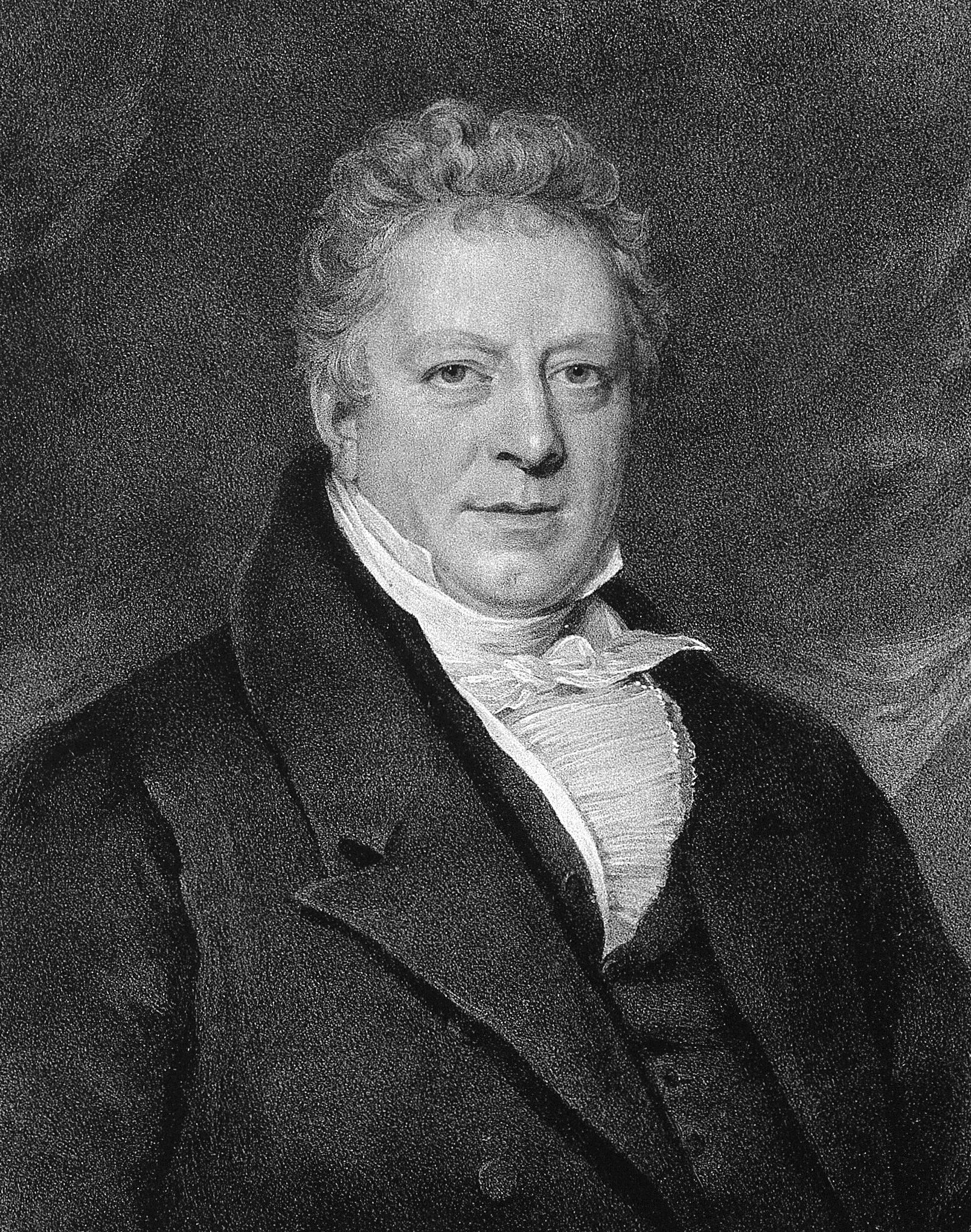
Alexander Manson

Alexander Manson FRSE (1774 – 19 March 1840) was a Scottish medical doctor based in Nottingham who pioneered the use of iodine in medicine.

== Life ==
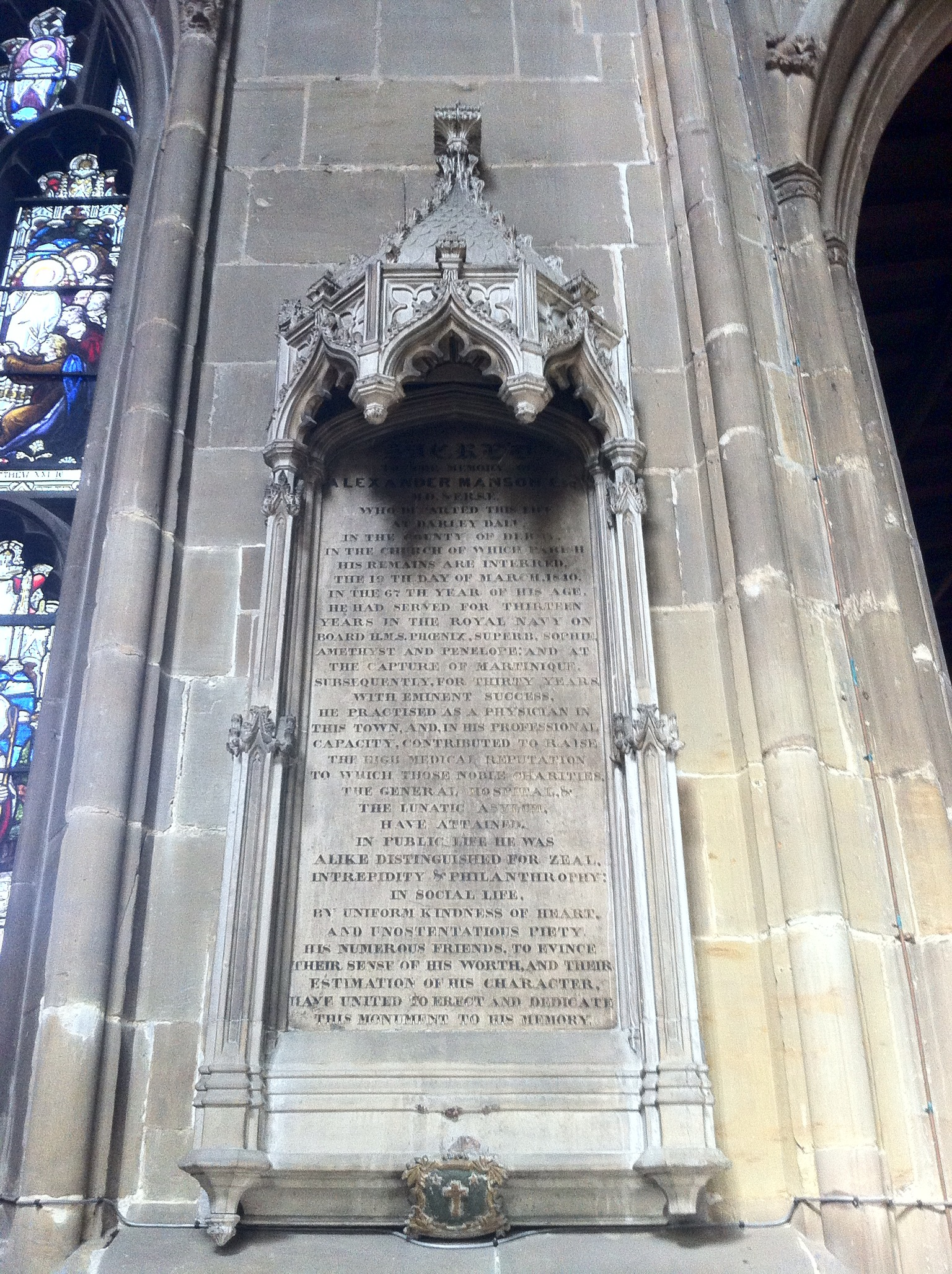
Memorial to Alexander Manson in St Mary's Church, Nottingham

Manson was born in Kirkcudbright in 1774, the son of Ann McGowan, and her husband William Manson. He was christened in Kells on 8 February 1775. He studied medicine at the University of Edinburgh graduating with an MD in 1811.

He served in the Royal Navy from 1798 to 1810 on HMS Phoenix, HMS Superb, HMS Sophie, HMS Amethyst and HMS Penelope, and at the Invasion of Martinique (1809).

He was a physician at Nottingham General Hospital from 1813 to 1832, and at St Mary's Workhouse Dispensary on Mansfield Road. He pioneered the use of iodine as a cure for certain medical conditions. His note books carry records of his cases.

In 1825 he published a reference book about his medical researches into the "effects of Iodine in Bronchocele, Paralysis, Chorea, Scrofula, Fistula, Lachrymalis, Deafness, Dysphagia, White-swelling, and Distortions of the Spine".

He was elected a Fellow of the Royal Society of Edinburgh on 7 April 1828 his proposer being Dr Robert Jameson.

During the Reform Riots, Manson, who was thought to be a supporter of the anti-reformists, was stoned by an angry crowd of demonstrators on 21 September 1831 in his carriage on Pelham Street in Nottingham. Later the same evening his home in Stoney Street, Nottingham was attacked.

He resigned his appointments in 1832 and went to live in Darley Dale, Derbyshire, where he died in 1840, aged 66. He is interred in the churchyard of St Helen's Church, Darley Dale.

A monument was erected in his memory in St Mary's Church, Nottingham.

== Family ==
He married Ann Nevill Grist, daughter of Thomas Grist on 8 February 1814 in St Mary's Church, Nottingham.

== Publications ==
- Dissertatio Medica Inauguralis de Synocha, sive Febre Flava. Alexander Manson, Edinburgh. Adam Neill. 1811.
- Medical researches on the effects of iodine, in bronchocele, paralysis, chorea, scrophula, fistula lachrymalis, deafness, dysphagia, white swelling, and distortions of the spine. Alexander Manson. Longman, Hurst, Rees, Orme, Brown, and Green, 1825
