= St Mary's Church, Nottingham =

Church in Nottingham, England

Coordinates: 52°57′4″N 1°8′34″W

St Mary's Church
- St Mary’s in the Lace Market
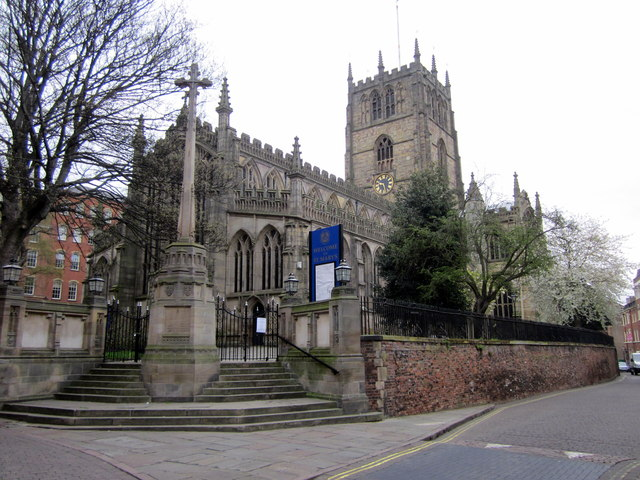
- St Mary's Church and the County War Memorial

- Location within Nottingham
- OS grid reference: SK 57673 39654
- Country: England
- Denomination: Church of England
- Churchmanship: Book of Common Prayer / Broad Church
- Website: www.stmarysnottingham.org

History
- Dedication: St Mary the Virgin

Architecture
- Heritage designation

Listed Building – Grade I
- Designated: 11 August 1952
- Reference no.: 1342118

Specifications
- Length: 215 feet (66 m)
- Width: 100 feet (30 m)

Administration
- Province: York
- Diocese: Southwell and Nottingham
- Archdeaconry: Nottingham
- Deanery: Nottingham South
- Benefice: Saint Mary the Virgin, the Lace Market, Nottingham
- Parish: Saint Mary the Virgin, the Lace Market, Nottingham

Clergy
- Vicar: The Rev'd Dr James Saunders

The Church of St Mary the Virgin is the oldest parish church in Nottingham, England. The church is Grade I listed by the Department for Digital, Culture, Media and Sport as a building of outstanding architectural or historic interest. It is one of only five Grade I listed buildings in the City of Nottingham.

It is situated on High Pavement at the heart of the historic Lace Market district and is also known as St Mary's in the Lace Market. It is a member of the Major Churches Network.

== History ==
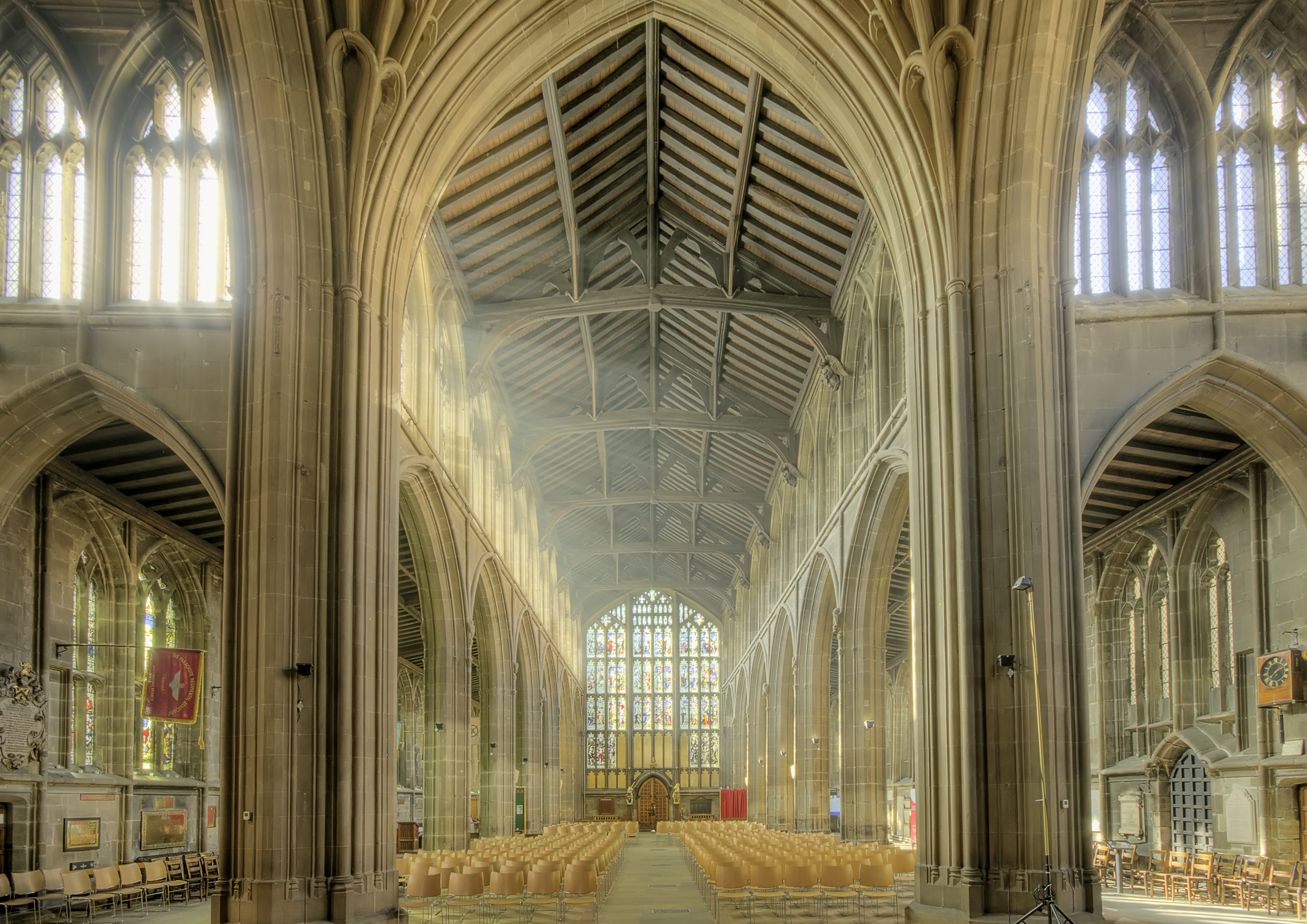
The nave and aisles

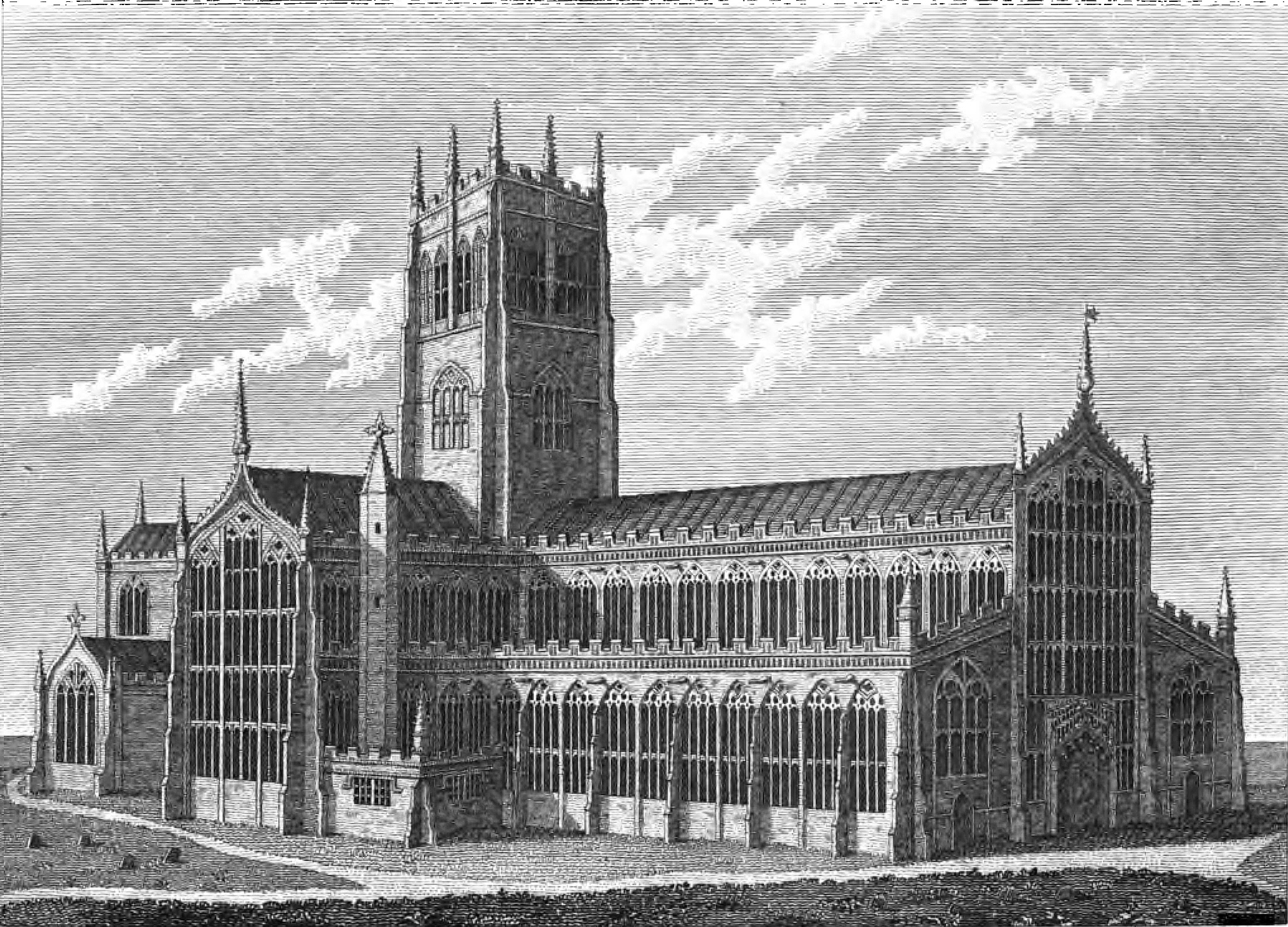
The church before 1677

The church is mentioned in the Domesday Book of 1086 and is believed to date back to Saxon times. The main body of the present building (at least the third on the site) dates from the end of the reign of Edward III (1377) to that of Henry VII (1485–1509). The nave was finished before 1475 and it is notable for its uniformity of gothic perpendicular style. It is likely that the south aisle wall was the first part of the building to be constructed in the early 1380s, with the remainder of the nave and transepts being from the early 15th century. The tower was completed in the reign of Henry VIII.

The church was owned by Lenton Priory from 1108 to 1538 and the monks took the living of the church as Rector, and appointed a Vicar to perform the daily offices.

In 1513, a school was founded in the church by Dame Agnes Mellers as The Free School of the Town of Nottingham. This is now Nottingham High School. In the Foundation Deed, Mellers provided that a Commemoration Service should be held in the church "on the Feast of The Translation of St Richard of Chichester". With the exception of the Goose Fair, it is the most ancient ceremonial event still perpetuated in the City of Nottingham.

George Fox founder of the Religious Society of Friends, commonly known as the Quakers or Friends, was imprisoned in Nottingham in 1649 after interrupting the preacher at St Mary's.

Nottingham Bluecoat School was founded in 1706, and the first lessons were taught in the porch of the church.

For several years from 1716, the church was used to house the town fire engine. It was kept at the west end, and was still there until at least 1770.

St Mary's opened a workhouse in 1726 at the south end of Mansfield Road and ran it until 1834 when responsibility for workhouses was transferred from parishes to secular Boards of Guardians. The workhouse was demolished in 1895 to clear part of the site needed for the construction of the Nottingham Victoria railway station.

The church was closed for 5 years from 1843 for a major restoration. It re-opened on 19 May 1848 when the Bishop of Lincoln John Kaye presided.

=== First Sunday School ===
St Mary's pioneered Sunday School education for those children unable to attend a day school. Pupils were taught reading, writing and arithmetic, as well as religious knowledge. The first Sunday School was opened in 1751, 35 years before the generally acknowledged first Sunday School was founded in Gloucester by Robert Raikes.

=== New parishes created from St Mary's ===
- 1822: St Paul's Church, George Street, Nottingham, built as a chapel of ease
- 1841: Holy Trinity Church, Trinity Square
- 1844: St John the Baptist's Church, Leenside (destroyed by enemy action in May 1941)
- 1856: St Mark's Church, Nottingham
- 1856: St Matthew's Church, Talbot Street
- 1863: St Ann's Church, Nottingham, with St Andrew's created out of this parish, in 1871
- 1863: St Luke's Church, Nottingham
- 1863: St Saviour's, Arkwright Street
- 1864: All Saints', Raleigh Street, as a chapel of ease
- 1881: Emmanuel Church, Woodborough Road, in 1885
- 1888: St Catharine's, St Ann's Well Road, out of the parishes of St Mary, St Mark, St Luke and St Paul
- 1903: St Bartholomew's Church, Blue Bell Hill Road

=== Restorations ===
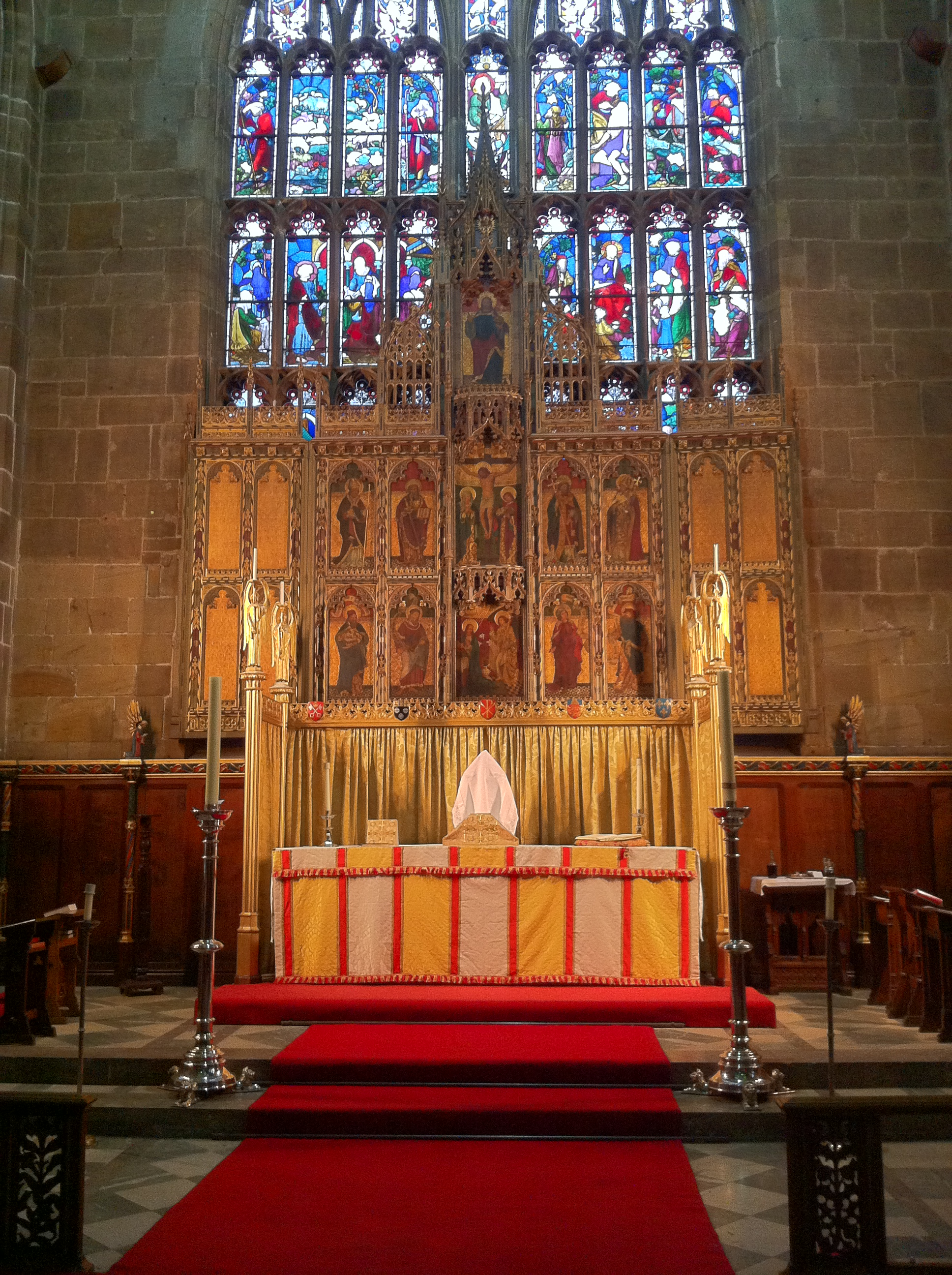
The high altar with the reredos by George Frederick Bodley

- 1762: West front rebuilt by William Hiorne of Warwick in the Classical style.
- c.1818–20: South aisle restored and crossing vault replaced by William Stretton.
- 1843: Tower saved from collapse by Lewis Nockalls Cottingham.
- 1844–1848: Five-year restoration of roofs and west front returned to gothic style by George Gilbert Scott (church closed) at a cost of £9,000 (equivalent to £926,230 in 2025),
- 1848–1860s: Internal restoration by George Gilbert Scott and William Bonython Moffatt.
- 1872: Chancel reroofed by George Gilbert Scott.
- 1890: The Chapter House was built by George Frederick Bodley.
- 1912: The Lady Chapel added by Temple Lushington Moore.
- 1935: Tower ringing room floor concreted and new bell frame
- 1940: The Simpson memorial choir vestry added.
- 1992–93: Exterior fabric restored and cleaned.
- 2008: New kitchens and toilet facilities.
- 2013: Removal of the wooden flooring platforms, installation of underfloor heating and new stone floor.
- 2024: Repair of the South Transept, installation of a servery and new west porch.

=== Chantry door ===
The chantry door is considered to be the oldest surviving door in Nottingham, dating from the 1370s or 1380s. it contains an example of iron work from the medieval period in the locking mechanism.

The chantry room has latterly been used as a bonehouse, a coal store, and a chair store. It now contains a toilet for wheelchair users.

The survival of the door is likely to be due to the fact that it has not been heavily used, and is internal within the church.

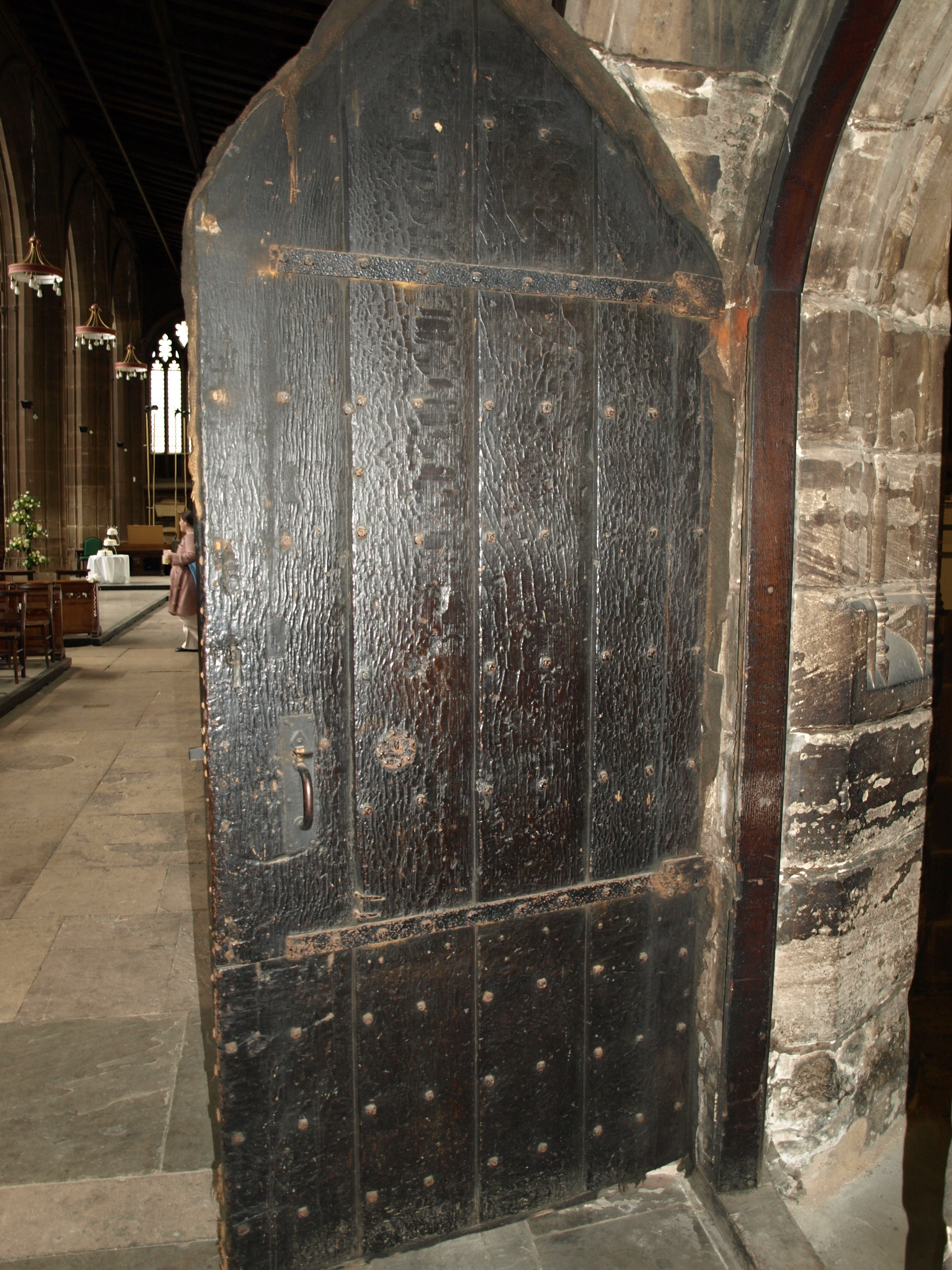
View of the old exterior of the Chantry door

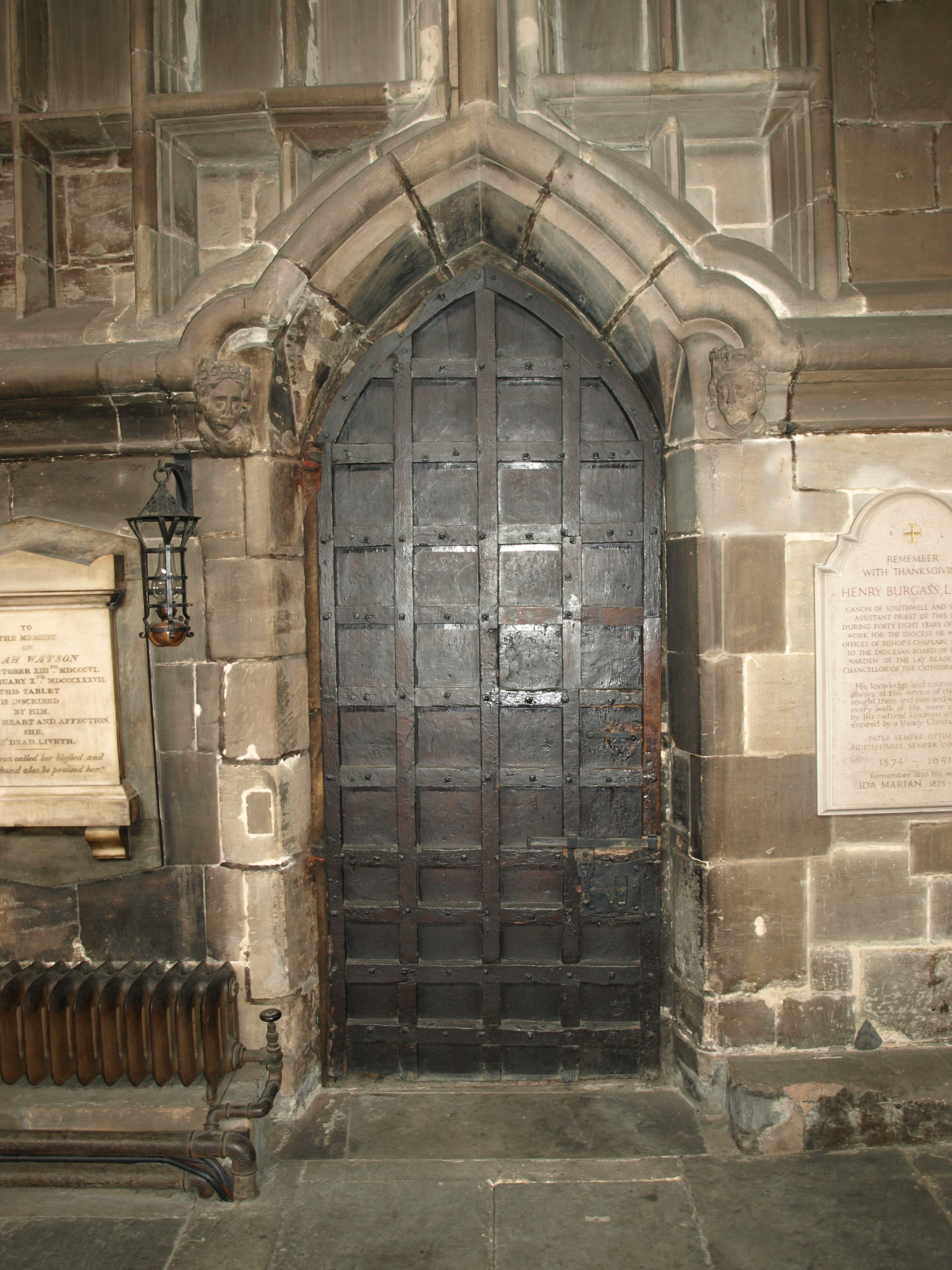
View of the Chantry door from the north aisle

=== List of vicars ===
- 1086 Aitard
- 1228 Thomas de Punignal
- c.1235 Nicholas (? of Ostia)
- c.1250 Philip de Norhamptone
- c.1266 William de Birley
- c.1279 Robert de Adinburg
- 1289 Richard de Notingham
- 1290 John de Ely
- 1304 Robert de Dalby
- 1313 Henry de Parva Halam
- 1317 John de Ludham
- 1322 John fil William Cosyn
- 1347 John de la Launde
- 1347 Robert de Wakebrigge
- 1348 Richard de Radclyff
- 1348 Roger de Nydingworth
- 1349 Richard de Swanyngton
- 1351 Thomas Pascayl
- 1357 John Chatarez
- 1357 John Lorymer, of Hoveden
- 1364 John de Stapleford
- 1371 William de Sandyacre
- 1374 Robert de Retford
- 1401 Richard de Chilwell
- 1409 William Ode
- 1442 William Wryght
- 1461 John Hurt, S.T.D.
- 1476 Thomas Turner, M.A.
- 1498 John Greve, S.T.B.
- 1499 Symeon Yates, Dec. B.
- 1504 Richard Taverner LL.B.
- 1534 Richard Mathew, Dec.B.
- 1535 Richard Wylde, M.A.
- 1554 Oliver Hawood
- 1568 John Louth, LL.B.
- 1572 William Underne
- 1578 Robert Aldridge
- 1616 Oliver Wytherington, M.A.
- 1616 John Tolson, S.T.B.
- 1617 Ralph Hansby, M.A.
- 1635 Edmund Lacock, B.D.
- 1645 William Howitt
- 1647/8 Nicholas Folkingham
- 1649 Jonathan Boole
- 1651 John Whitlock M.A. and William Reynolds, M.A.
- 1662 George Masterson, M.A.
- 1686 Samuel Crowborough, D.D.
- 1690 Benjamin Camfield, M.A.
- 1694 Timothy Caryl, M.A.
- 1698 Edward Clarke, M.A.
- 1708 Samuel Berdmore, M.A.
- 1723 John Disney, M.A.
- 1730 Thomas Berdmore, M.A.
- 1743 Scrope Berdmore, D.D.
- 1770 Nathan Haines D.D.
- 1806 John Bristow, D.D.
- 1810 George Hutchinson, M.A.
- 1817 George Wilkins, D.D.
- 1843 Joshua William Brooks, M.A.
- 1864 Francis Morse, M.A.
- 1886 John Gray Richardson, M.A.
- 1900 Arthur Hamilton Baynes, D.D., Bp.
- 1913 Thomas Field, D.D.
- 1926 James Geoffrey Gordon, M.A.
- 1933 Neville Stuart Talbot, D.D., Bp.
- 1943 Robert Henry Hawkins, M.A.
- 1958 Douglas Russell Feaver, M.A.
- 1973 Michael James Jackson, M.A.
- 1991 James Edward McKenzie Neale, B.A.
- 2004 Andrew Gilchrist Deuchar B.Th (Priest in charge)
- 2009 Christopher Dennis Harrison B.A. (Priest in charge, appointed Vicar 2011)
- 2018 Thomas Alan Gillum B.Sc.
- 2024 James Benedict John Saunders Ph.D.

=== Laying on of hands ===
It was at St Mary's that the practice of laying on of hands by the Bishop during a confirmation service was first observed ca. 1760 and documented by Thomas Newton, Bishop of Bristol. It was performed by John Gilbert, Archbishop of York.

== Features ==
=== Bronze doors ===
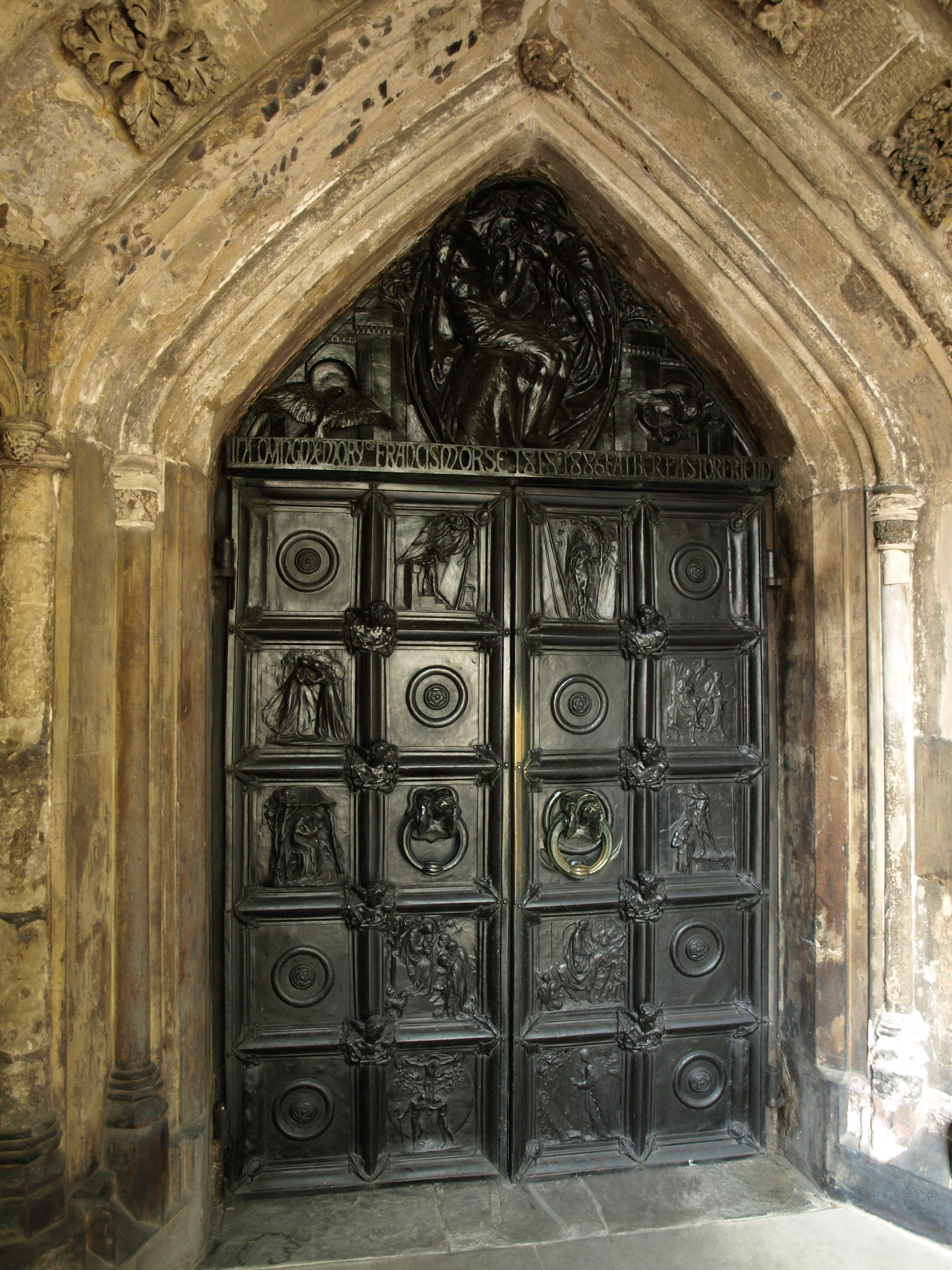
The south porch doors are by the architect Henry Wilson. A complex work in bronze, the door contains 10 panels with New Testament scenes, and two door handles with cherubic heads. A further eight heads are on the cross pieces. Above, Christ and angel with doves.

The bronze doors were designed in 1904 by Henry Wilson in memory of his father-in-law, Rev. Francis Morse.

The intention of the design of the doors is to illustrate the Life of Our Lord in its relation with the Holy Mother to whom the church is dedicated and by the general treatment to suggest the idea of pity.

In the tympanum enclosed within a vesica the Holy Mother supports and cherishes the body of Christ, while in the spandrels, on either side, the gates of Death and Life are suggested: the Dove, typifying the spirit, enters weary into the one and issues strong-winged from the other, thus symbolising the unending round of Death and Life.

The dedicatory inscription "In loving memory of Francis Morse, 1818–1886, Father, Pastor, Friend" in the form of a pierced cresting, divides the tympanum from the doors themselves. These are formed into panels by mouldings of beaten bronze, with angel bosses at the intersections.

On each leaf of the door are five panels, in relief, illustrating the Life of Our Lord, the subjects on the left leaf being "The Annunciation", with Gabriel appearing at the Virgin's window in the early morning; "The Visitation", with the Virgin running to meet her kinswoman. Below these come "The Nativity", followed by "The Epiphany", and the lowest panel shows the Salvator Mundi on a Cross of branching vine. At the foot of the Cross stand Adam and Eve, conscious of the fall, while the doves of peace and pardon hover overhead.

The subjects of the panels on the right door of the leaf are "The flight into Egypt"; "The Baptism in the Jordan"; "The entry into Jerusalem"; The three Maries at the Sepulchre"; and "The Resurrection". In this panel the Saviour is shown emerging from the tomb and while still bound with the grave clothes, the Spirit of Life, in the form of a Dove, flies to His breast, and overhead the birds sing at the coming of a new Dawn.

=== Other features ===
The church has a fine collection of late Victorian stained glass windows by many famous makers, including Kempe, Burlison and Grylls and Hardman & Co. The reredos above the altar is by the artist Charles Edgar Buckeridge.

It is also known for its octagonal mediaeval font with a palindromic Greek inscription ΝΙΨΟΝΑΝΟΜΗΜΑΤΑΜΗΜΟΝΑΝΟΨΙΝ (Wash my transgressions, not only my face), and a rather battered alabaster tomb fragment which portrays a lily crucifix and a Nottingham alabaster panel depicting Archbishop Thomas Becket.

== The church today ==
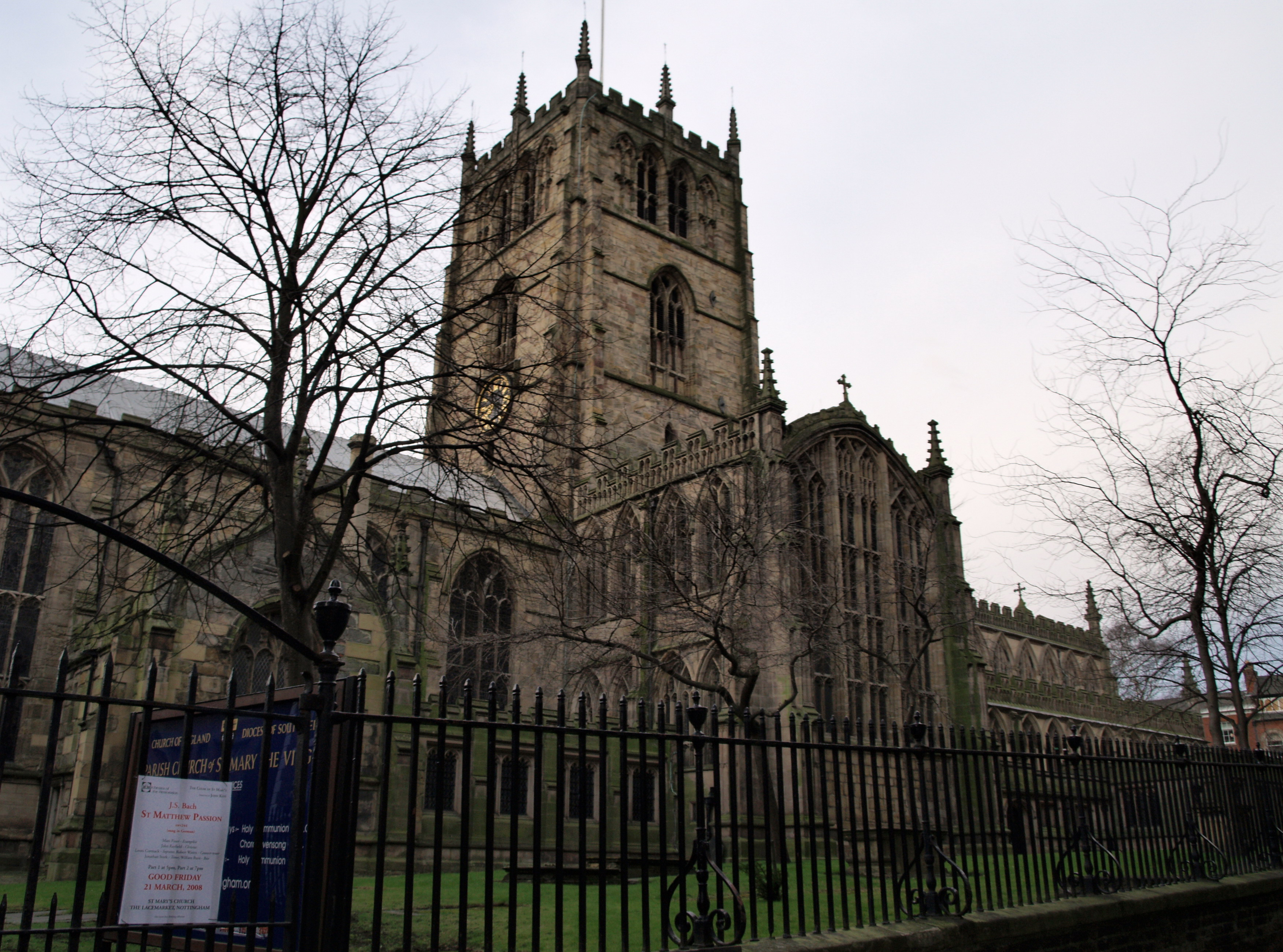
The exterior of St Mary's Church

St Mary's internal dimensions are

- 215 feet (66 m) from west to east
- 100 feet (30 m) from north to south (across the transepts)

while the tower stands 126 feet (38 m) above ground level.

The church has a wide ministry to many different groups. It is the Civic Church to the City of Nottingham. In the past, the election of the town mayor took place in the church.

It is the University Church for the University of Nottingham and several schools and organisations hold annual services here.

In recent years, in addition to its function as a place of worship, St Mary's is the venue for a wide range of concerts and public performances.

Historically, the assistant curate at St Mary's takes the ancient title 'Lecturer'. This title, which fell into disuse in the 17th century, was revived for Rev. John Pennington on his appointment in 1975. This post is currently vacant.

The church retains the traditional liturgical colours and the principal services are sung by a robed choir. Services are conducted using both the Book of Common Prayer and Common Worship.

St Mary's sometimes retains the historic practice of celebrating the Eucharist at a High Altar Ad orientem with priest and people facing eastwards, rather than the contemporary practice of Versus populum having the priest facing the congregation.

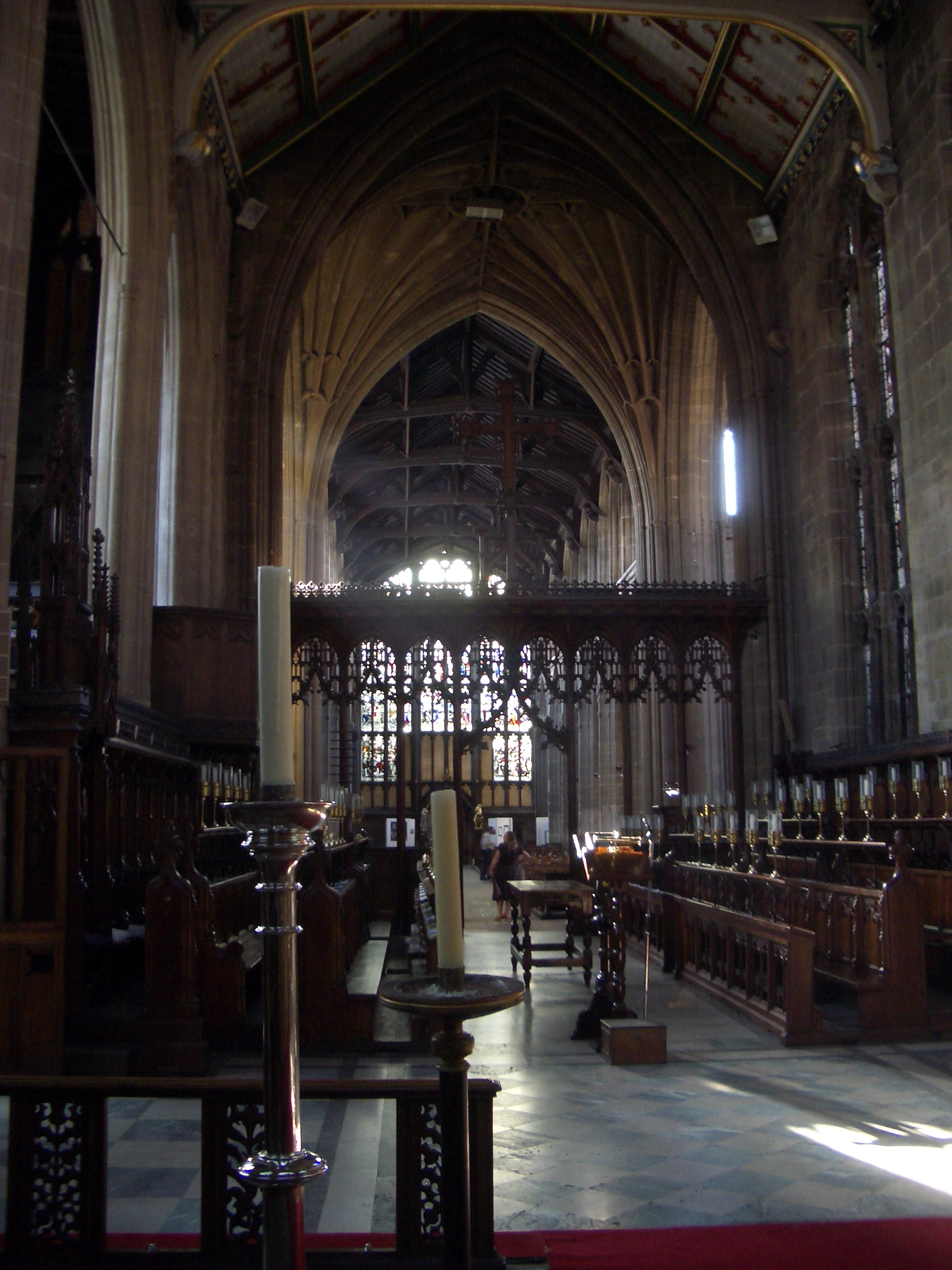
Interior view looking west from the sanctuary

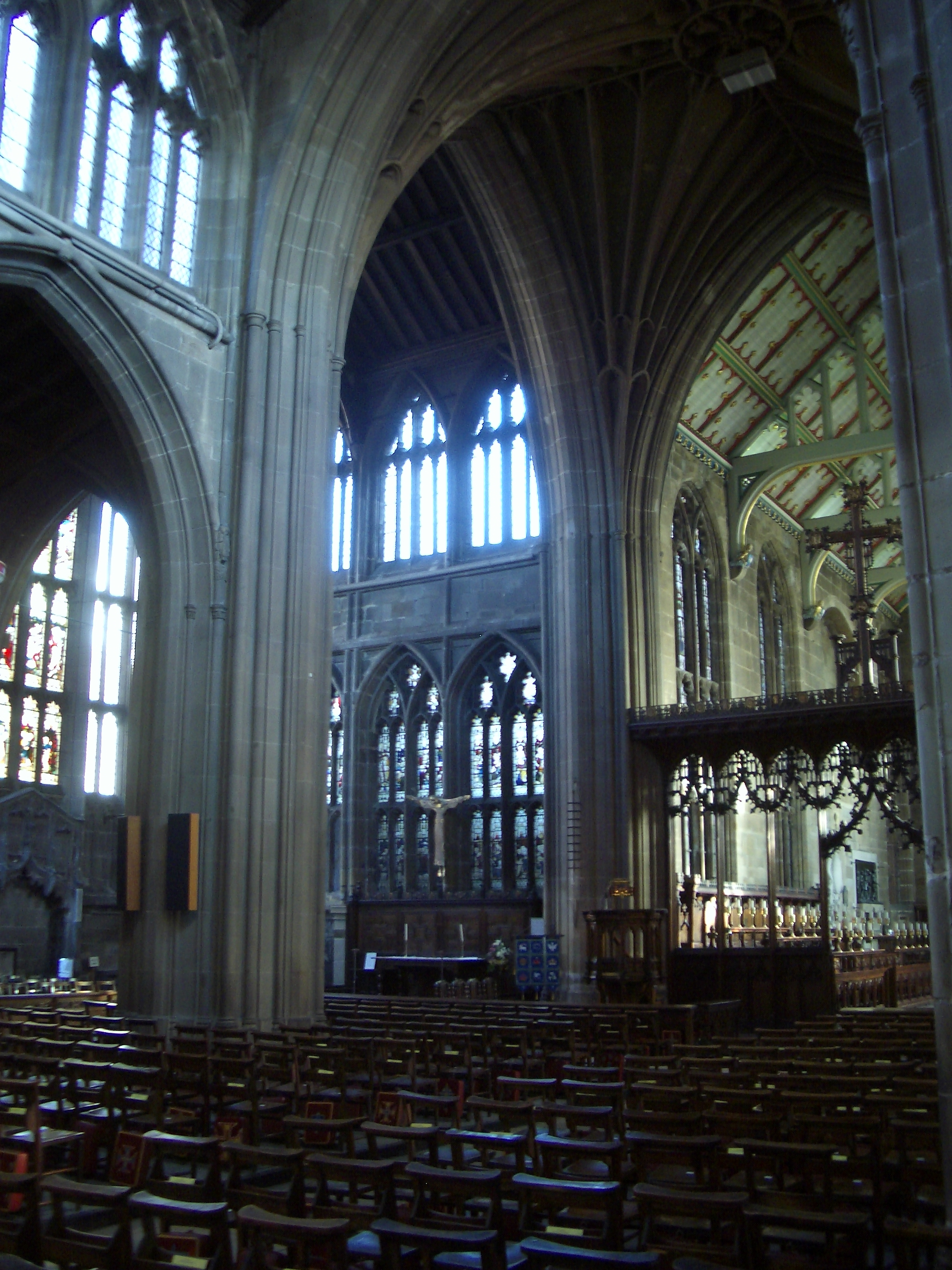
Interior view looking north east from the south porch

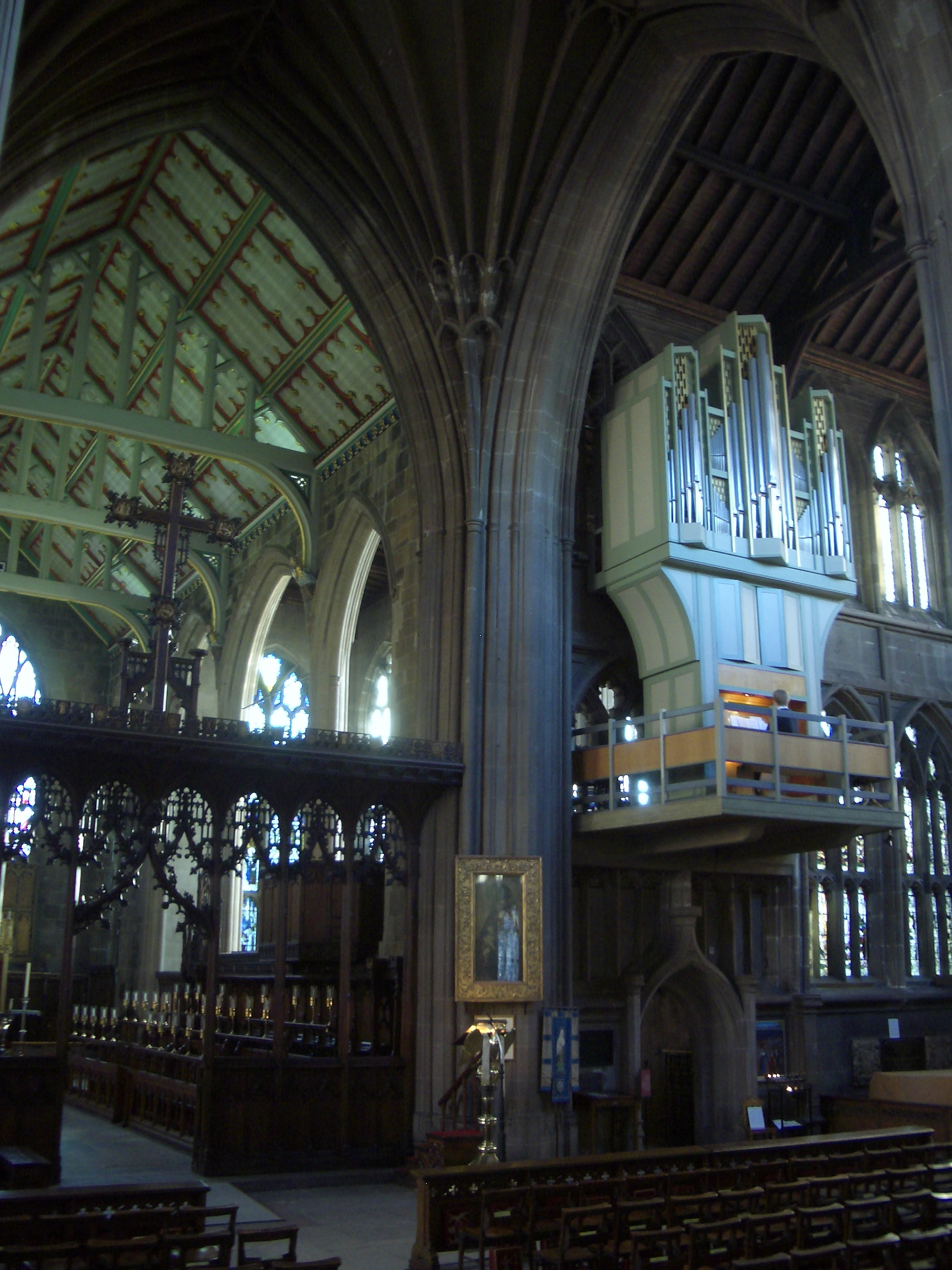
Interior view looking south east from the north aisle with the organ by Marcussen & Søn

== Vicarage ==
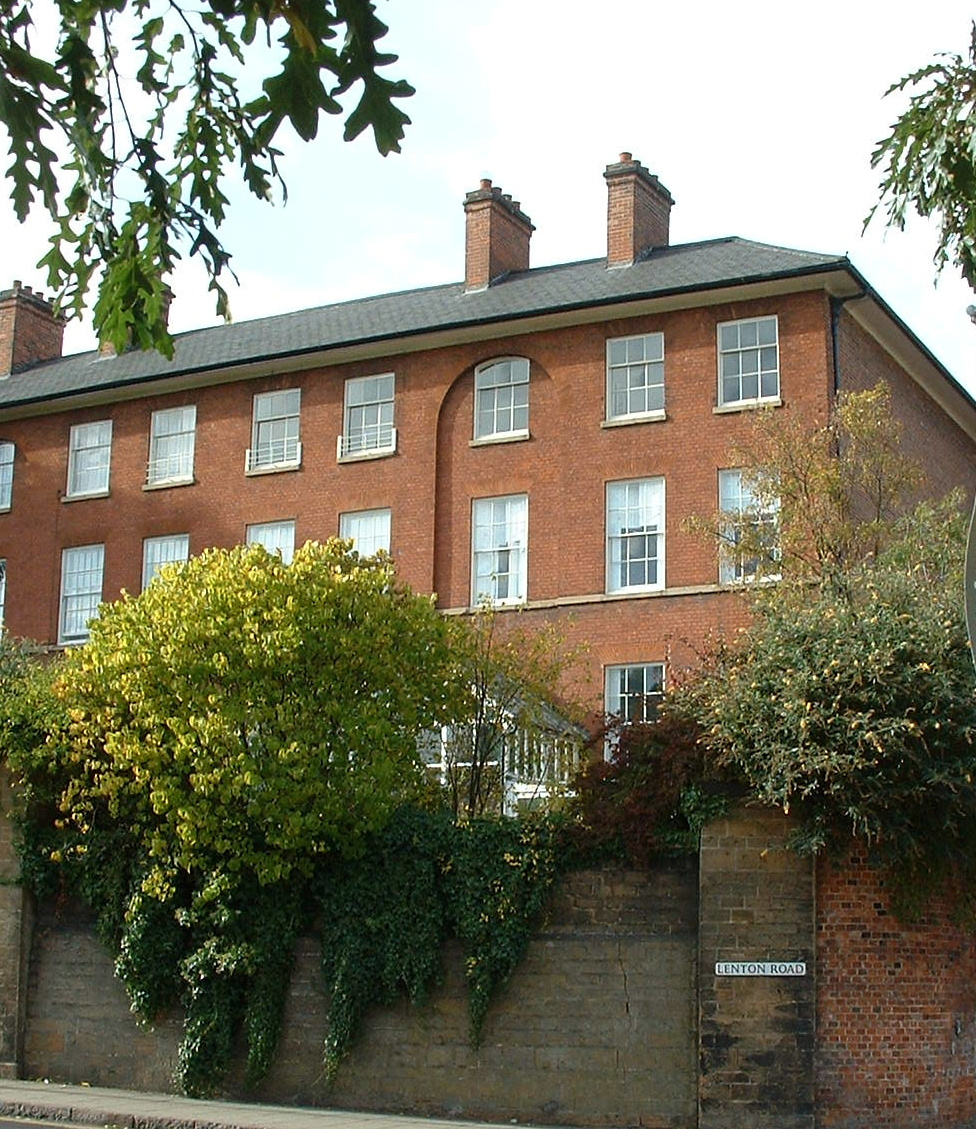
St Mary's vicarage until 2003

The vicarage of St Mary's was formerly at Washington House on High Pavement, but with the increasing industrialisation of the Lace Market at the end of the 19th century, the church purchased a new residence opposite the castle gatehouse. This was used as St Mary's Vicarage until Canon Eddie Neale retired in 2003.

The adjoining property was the rectory for St Peter's Church, Nottingham.

A parish house has now been purchased in The Park Estate.

== Notable burials in St Mary's ==
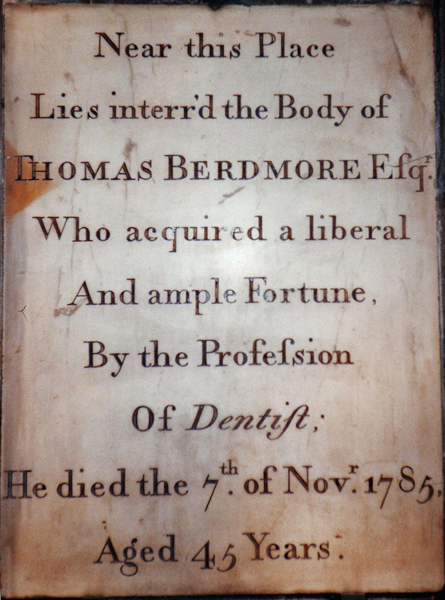
Thomas Berdmore, dentist to King George III, 1785

- John Samon, Mayor of Nottingham, 1416
- Thomas Thurland, Mayor of Nottingham, 1473
- John Holles, 1st Earl of Clare, 1637
- John Holles, 2nd Earl of Clare, 1666
- Eleanor Fitzwilliam, Countess of Tyrconnell, 1681, daughter of John Holles, 1st Earl of Clare
- Lady Jane, Dowager Countess of Valentia 1683/4, widow of Francis Annesley, 1st Viscount Valentia, daughter of Sir John Stanhope.
- Chambre Brabazon, 5th Earl of Meath, 1715
- Lady Mary Brabazon, daughter of Chambre Brabazon, 5th Earl of Meath, 1737
- Thomas Berdmore, dentist to King George III, 1785
- George Africanus, 1834
- Robert Aldridge, Vicar of St Mary's (1598–1616)

== Notable marriages in the church ==
- George James Bruere, later Governor of Bermuda, 1743
- Alexander Manson MD, pioneer in the use of iodine in medicine, 1814.

== Bells and clock ==
There are twelve bells in the ring.

- Treble Eijsbouts Astensis me fecit Anno MCMLXXX. The Society of Sherwood Youths gave me. "Their sound is gone forth unto all lands". Canon M.J. Jackson, Vicar, S. Yarnell and E. Mottram, Churchwardens. (E) Eayre and Smith.
- 2nd Eijsbouts Astensis me fecit Anno MCMLXXX. The Parochial Church Council gave me. "God is gone up with a merry noise". Canon M.J. Jackson, Vicar, S. Yarnell and E. Mottram, Churchwardens. (E) Eayre and Smith.
- 3rd C. & G. Mears, Founders, London, Recast 1856. J.W. Brooks, Vicar. W. Dearden, J. Coope, Churchwardens. Recast Gillett & Johnston, Croydon, 1935.
- 4th Raised by Scrope Beardsmore, Vicar DD. Richd Lambert and John Wyer, Churchwardens. The Hon'able Wm. Howe & John Plumtree Esqrs – Members for the Town Subscription, 1761. Lester & Pack Fecit. Recast, Gillett & Johnston, Croydon, 1935.
- 5th By Subscription. Revd. Scrope Beardsmore DD. Vicar. G. Browne, H. Ward, J. Burgess Ch. Wardens. 1765. Sodales Musici Nottinghamiensis Restaureverunt. Lester & Pack of London Fecit. Recast Gillett & Johnston, Croydon, 1935.
- 6th By Subscription Revd. Scrope Beardsmore DD. Vicar. G. Browne, H. Ward, J. Burgess Ch. Wardens. 1765. Intactum Sileo Percute, Dulce Cano. Lester & Pack of London Fecit. Recast Gillett & Johnston, Croydon, 1935.
- 7th Sustio Voce Pios Tu Iesu Dirige Mentes Venite Exvitimus. (I. Edwards, I. Sweetaple. Churchwardens 1699. Recast Gillett & Johnston, Croydon, 1935.
- 8th Robert Aldredg, Vicar, Ralphe Shaw, Henrie Allvie, Wardens. 1613. Recast Gillett & Johnston, Croydon, 1935.
- 9th Hee Campana Sacra Filet Trinitate Beata. W. Sturrup, T. Graye. Wardens. 1690. Recast Gillett & Johnston, Croydon, 1935.
- 10th In noe ihu xpi ome genu fleetat celestm trestriu et infroru. R.A.V. M.G. 1605. W.L. Recast Gillett & Johnston, Croydon, 1935.
- 11th Tu Tuba Sic Sonitu Domini Conduco cohortes. Richard Hunte Major, Nicholas Sherwyn, Richard Iohnson, Iohn Gregorie, Robert Alvie, Peter Clarke, Humfrey Bonner, Richard Morehaghe, Anker Jackson, Aldermen, 1595. Also four impressions of the coat of arms of Elizabeth I alternating with four signs of the Henry Oldfield foundry.
- Tenor Revd. Scrope Beardsmore DD. Vicar. G. Browne, H. Ward, I. Burgess, Ch. Wardens. 1765. I will sound and resound unto thy people, O Lord, With my sweet voice, and call them to thy word, I tole the tune that douleful is to such as live amiss, But sweet my sound seems unto them who hope for joyful Bliss. Lester & Pack of London Fecit. Recast Gillett & Johnston, Croydon, 1935.

The first record of a tower clock dates from 1707 when a clock was installed by Richard Roe of Epperstone. This was replaced in 1807 by a clock by Thomas Hardy of Nottingham. The 1707 clock was moved to Staunton church.

The most recent tower clock which dates from 1936 was installed by George & Francis Cope at a cost of £200 (equivalent to £12,221 in 2025). It was the first electric auto-wind clock by that firm and the pendulum weight is 150lb.

In May 2022, the bell tower walls were identified as needing structural repair due to loads thrust upon the supporting timbers by the swinging action of the bells. No regular bellringing was possible until completion of work, anticipated to cost £165,000, has been finished. In April 2023, the costs had risen to at least £185,000 with a time frame for completion of 20 weeks. The funding had been raised and the bells were expected to peal specially for the coronation of King Charles III, albeit with scaffolding supporting the masonry.

== Music ==
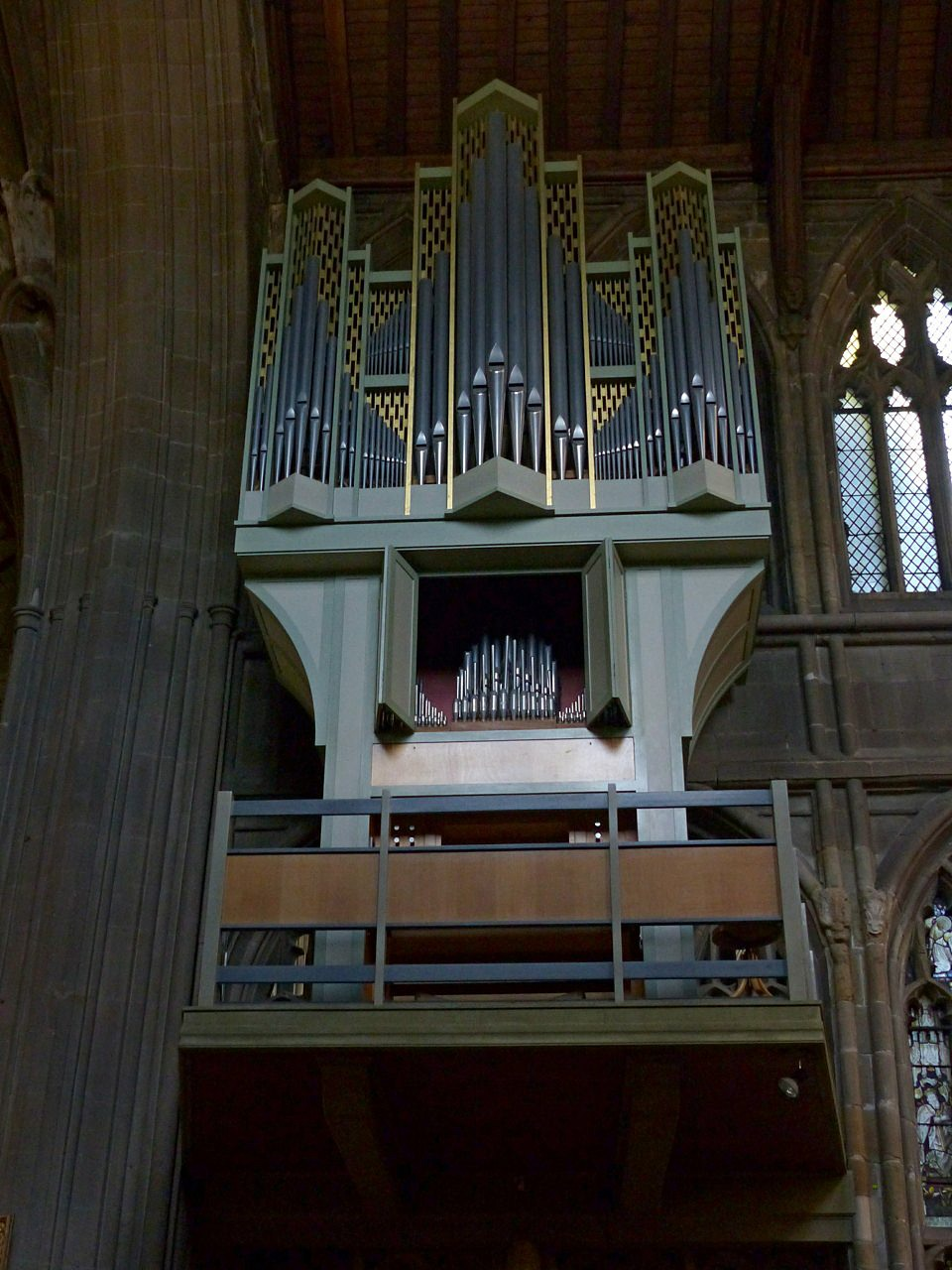
The organ by Marcussen & Søn 1973

=== Choir ===
There are three choral services a week – Wednesday Evensong, Sunday Eucharist and Sunday Evensong. The Choir of St Mary's performs regularly in concert on its own and with St Mary's resident orchestra, The Orchestra of the Restoration. Organ and Choral Scholarships are available to students in full-time higher education.

=== Organ ===
The organ is by Marcussen & Søn of Denmark and is a fine example of a neo-classical style instrument. It was installed in 1973 by the organist of the time, David Butterworth. It has 25 speaking stops and is a small organ for a church of this size. Nevertheless, it is an instrument of the highest quality which adequately gives musical support to choir and congregation as well as serving as a solo instrument.

=== Organists ===
There are records of organs in the church in the late 16th and early 17th centuries, but no record of any of the organists from this period has been found.

| Date | Name | Comments |
|---|---|---|
| 1704–1712 | Thomas Rathbone | (d.1712) |
| 1712–1755 | William Lamb | (d.1755) |
| 1756–1802 | Samuel Wise | (c.1730–1802) formerly organist of the Church of St Mary Magdalene, Newark-on-Trent and Southwell Minster |
| 1802 – ???? | John Pearson | (c.1754–1832) organist until at least 1818 |
| ???? – 1831 | John Pearson | (c.1790–1831) date of appointment unknown but before 1825 |
| 1831–1836 | William Aspull | (1798–1875) |
| 1836–1867 | Charles C Noble | (1812–1885) formerly organist of St Martin's Church, Stamford, latterly organist of St Ann's Church, Nottingham |
| 1867–1904 | James Arthur Page FRCO | (1846–1916) |
| 1904–1914 | William Frederick Dunnill FRCO ARCM | (1880–1936) formerly organist of Christ Church, Surbiton and St Luke's Church, Bromley, latterly organist of Birmingham Cathedral |
| 1914–1922 | Frank Radcliffe MusDoc FRCO | (1883–1922) formerly assistant organist of Manchester Cathedral and organist of St Wulfram's Church, Grantham |
| 1922–1928 | Vernon Sydney Read ARCM FRCO | (1886–1980) formerly organist of Holy Trinity Church, Lenton, latterly organist of St John's Church, Torquay |
| 1928–1954 | Henry Oswald Hodgson FRCO | (1886–1975) |
| 1954–1956 | David James Lumsden MA DPhil BMus HonFRCO | (b. 1928) formerly assistant organist of St John's College, Cambridge, latterly organist of Southwell Minster and New College, Oxford |
| 1957–1967 | Russell Arthur Missin ThD FRCO(CHM) ADCM LTCL | (1922–2002) formerly assistant organist of Ely Cathedral and Organist of St Mary's Church, Thetford, Holbeach Parish Church and All Saints' Church, Oakham, latterly organist of Newcastle Cathedral |
| 1967–1983 | David Sheeran Butterworth MA MusB FRCO(CHM) FRSA | (b. 1946) latterly organist of St Peter and St Paul's Church, Mansfield and St Mary's Church, Clifton, Nottingham |
| 1984–2025 | John Anthony Keys MA LRAM ARCM ARCO | (b. 1956) formerly assistant organist of Chester Cathedral and Holy Trinity Church, Geneva and organist titulaire Eglise de St Jean, Geneva |
| 2025- | Peter Davis ARCO MACantab |

=== Organ scholars ===
- David Gostick: 1997–1998 (now director of music of Wimborne Minster)
- Alistair Kirk: 1998
- Richard Leach: 1999–2000
- Simon Williams: 2000–2003
- Christopher Burton: 2003–2004
- Jamal Sutton: 2004–2005
- Nicola Harrington: 2005
- Ben Lewis-Smith: 2006–2007
- Simon Williams: 2007–2009
- Max Puller: 2009–2010
- Dominic Wong: 2010–2011
- Edward Byrne: 2019–2021
- William Layzell-Smith: 2022–2025
- Philip Miles: 2025-present

== Churchyard ==
The South Notts Hussars tree planted in December 1978

Colonel Sir William Francis Barber Bt. TD, planted the South Nottinghamshire Hussars Red oak in 1978 in the south east corner of the churchyard above the long stairs entrance to mark the 50^{th} anniversary of that regiment. The oak tree was chosen as the acorn is the regimental badge.

The church contains two Common Yew trees which were planted in 2000 in the north east corner to mark the millennium.

== References in literature ==
The church is mentioned in chapter 15 of Sons and Lovers by D.H. Lawrence.

In the ballad Robin Hood and the Monk, Robin attends mass at St Mary's and is subsequently arrested by the Sheriff in the porch. The ballad is written in a manuscript dating from about 1450.

== See also ==
- Grade I listed buildings in Nottinghamshire
- Listed buildings in Nottingham (Bridge ward)
- All Saints' Church, Nottingham
- List of church restorations and alterations by Temple Moore
- St Peter's Church, Nottingham
