= Scrope Berdmore =

English clergyman

Rev. Scrope Berdmore (19 February 1708 – 16 February 1770) was an English clergyman.

His father was Samuel Berdmore and his mother was Martha Scrope. He matriculated from Merton College, Oxford in 1724, gained his BA in 1728, MA in 1732, BD in 1738 and Doctor of Divinity in 1742.

He followed his father as Vicar of St. Mary's Church, Nottingham, in 1743 and was also Vicar of St. Stephen's Church, Sneinton and St. Leonard's Church, Wollaton and Rector of St. Edmund's Church, Holme Pierrepont and of Adbolton.

He remained in charge of St Mary's until his death in 1770 and is buried there. His portrait hangs in the church.

== Family ==
His first marriage was to Mary (surname unknown) until her death in 1745. By Mary he had:

- Thomas, born c.1742 — this may be the Thomas Berdmore who became dentist to King George III.
- John, born c.1743.
- Hannah and Rachel, twins, also born c.1743.
- Scrope (1744–1816)

His second marriage was to Genevova de L'Angle, with whom he had the following children:

- Margaretta, born 1755 (married Rev. Richard Davies, Vicar of Horsley, Gloucestershire, at St Mary's in 1778).
- Evelyn, born 1756 (and died in infancy).

Church of England titles
Preceded by Thomas Berdmore	Vicar of St.Mary's Church, Nottingham; 1743–1770	Succeeded by Nathan Haines
