= John Kenneth Pennington =

Councillor, Nottingham City Council; Sheriff of Nottingham

Personal details
- Born: 1927 Wigan, England
- Died: 25 August 2011 (aged 83–84)
- Occupation: Anglican priest, politician

John Kenneth Pennington (1927–25 August 2011) was a priest in the Church of England, Nottingham City councillor and Sheriff of Nottingham.

== Family ==
He was born in Wigan in 1927. He studied law at the University of Manchester where he met his future wife, Jean. Rejecting a career in law, for two years he worked at a large textiles printing firm on Oxford Road before training for ordination at Lincoln Theological College.

After working in Liverpool, Rotherham, India and Blackburn, he moved to Nottingham in 1966.

== Ordained ministry ==
Pennington was ordained a deacon in 1952 and a priest in 1953. He held the following appointments:

- Curate at Holy Trinity Church, Wavertree, Liverpool 1952–1956
- Curate at Rotherham 1956–1959
- Priest in Charge at Christ Church College, Kanpur, Diocese of Lucknow 1959–1963
- Vicar at St Philip's Church, Nelson 1964–1966
- Area Secretary for USPG in Derby, Leicester and Southwell 1966–1971
- Area Secretary for USPG in Derby and Sheffield 1971–1975
- Lecturer at St Mary's Church, Nottingham 1975–1992

== Political career ==
Living in Nelson, Lancashire, he helped Sydney Silverman MP retain his seat of Nelson and Colne in the 1964 United Kingdom general election in a very difficult contest, beating a pro-capital punishment candidate who had suffered the murder of a relative.

He moved to Nottingham in 1966, was elected a Labour councillor in 1976 to represent Bestwood Park, and re-elected in 1979 to represent Bridge ward.

During his final year as councillor, in 1982–83, he was made Sheriff of Nottingham.

In 2006 he was made an honorary alderman of Nottingham.
