= Thomas Berdmore =

Thomas Berdmore (c.1740–1785) was dentist to King George III of Great Britain.

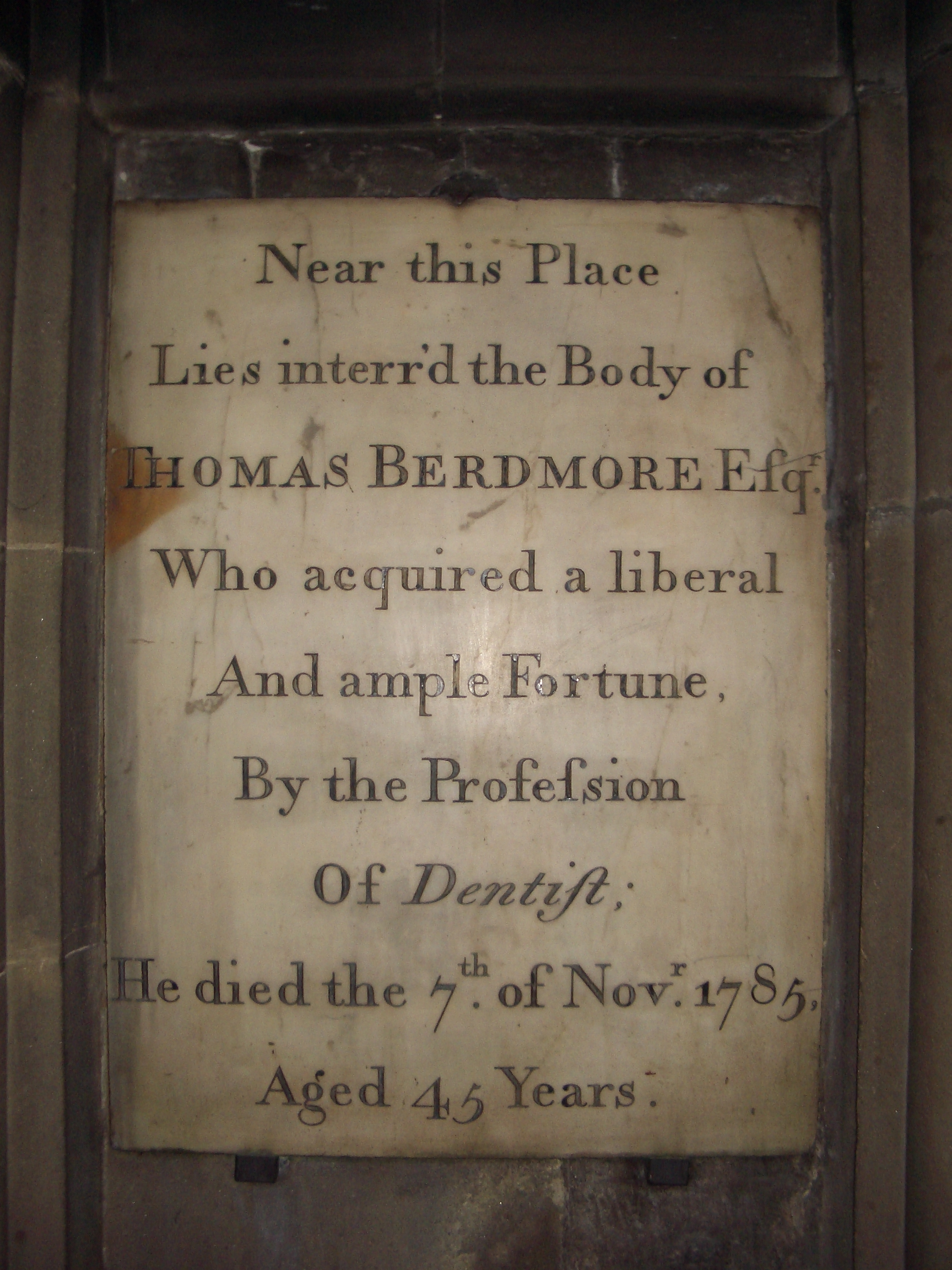
Memorial plaque in St. Mary's Church, Nottingham

== Life ==
He may have been apprenticed to Mark Skelton of Sheffield, Surgeon, in 1755 for the sum of £85. In due course he became renowned as the King's Dentist, under George III.

He was wealthy enough in later life to afford travel as a letter of introduction survives in the correspondence of Benjamin Franklin describing Berdmore's visit to Paris.

From Strahan, William. London., to Benjamin Franklin 1784 August 26 - Introducing Mr. [Thomas] Berdmore, the celebrated dentist, who goes to Paris on a pleasure jaunt. Visit he received lately from the Governor [Wm. Franklin]; glad there is nothing now to interrupt his correspondence with Franklin. Urges him to visit England.

== Death ==
Berdmore died on 7 November 1785, at his house off Fleet Street. He was aged 45 years and was buried in St. Mary's Church, Nottingham. He left money to his brother Samuel Berdmore, headmaster of Charterhouse School.

A marble plaque in the church of St Mary the Virgin, Nottingham, records how Berdmore "acquired a liberal and ample fortune by the profession of dentist. He died the 7th Novr 1785, aged 45 years". His will had directed that his epitaph show his fortune had been acquired "by tooth drawing", but the family had found that too indelicate.

== Works ==
As early as 1768, in what seems to have been the first English dental textbook, Berdmore had proclaimed the use of sugar as being bad for the teeth.

His book is entitled: A treatise on the disorders and deformities of the teeth and gums: explaining the most rational methods of treating their diseases: illustrated with cases and experiments, by Thomas Berdmore, member of the Surgeons Company, and dentist in ordinary to His Majesty. London: Printed for the author; Sold by Benjamin White ... James Dodsley ... and Becket and De Hondt ..., 1770.
