= Samuel Berdmore =

English clergyman

Samuel Berdmore (before 1693 – 24 March 1742/3) was an English clergyman.

Berdmore was the fourth son of Edward Berdmore of Worcester. He was educated at Charterhouse School. He matriculated at Merton College, Oxford in 1693, and gained a BA in 1697 and an MA from King's College, Cambridge in 1706.

He became Vicar of St. Mary's Church, Nottingham, in 1708, Prebendary of Southwell in 1713, Rector of Lambley, in 1714, of St. Edmund's Church, Holme Pierrepont, in 1719, of Cotgrave, Nottinghamshire, in 1722 and a Canon of York in 1735. He held several of these posts at the same time, and was onetime Chaplain to Evelyn Pierrepont, 1st Duke of Kingston-upon-Hull.

== Family ==
Berdmore married Martha Scrope on 8 July 1701 at St Mary the Virgin, Aldermanbury, London. The licence for this marriage was issued against the 'allegation' of a Mathew Beardmore, undoubtedly the same Mathew, lace-maker, who married Isabella Mason at St Nicholas Cole Abbey, London, in 1702 (and whose son, Thomas, born c. 1704, matriculated at Lincoln College in 1722 and gained his MA ten years' later), and possibly the Matthew Berdmore (or his son) who with wife Mary had a daughter Mary baptised at South Moreton, Berks, in 1679 and two Elizabeths baptised in London, one in 1681 and the second in 1686.

Samuel and Martha had a number of children:

- Scrope Berdmore (born 1708), baptised at St. Mary's Church, Nottingham:
- Edward (c.1710), baptised at St. Mary's Church, Nottingham:
- William (c.1712) baptised at St. Mary's Church, Nottingham:
- Elizabeth (c.1717) baptised at St. Mary's Church, Nottingham:
- Mathew (baptised at Totteridge 6 Jan 1704 and buried four days later),
- Martha (c.1707),
- Lucy (c.1712)
- Mary (c.1714).

It is possible that Berdmore married a second time, as there are a string of children of a Samuel and Elizabeth (possibly née Monille) all baptised at Mansfield Nottinghamshire, between 1723 and 1738.

Church of England titles
Preceded by Edward Clarke	Vicar of St. Mary's Church, Nottingham; 1708–1723	Succeeded by John Disney
