= Church of St Mary Magdalene, Hucknall =

Church in Nottinghamshire, England

Coordinates: 53°02′22″N 01°12′23″W

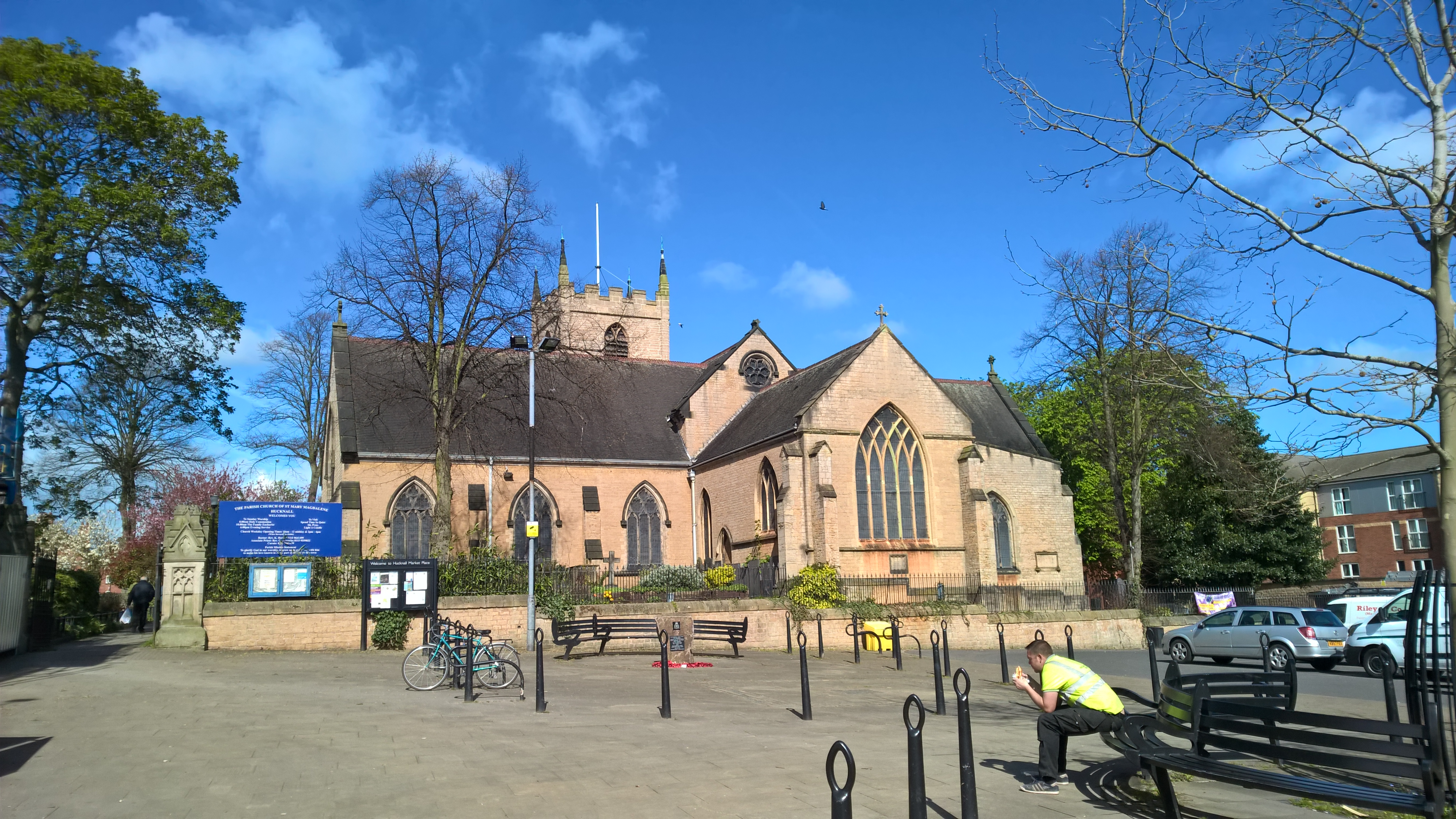
- Church of St Mary Magdalene
- Church of St Mary Magdalene, Hucknall
- Denomination: Church of England
- Churchmanship: Broad Church
- Website: http://hucknallparishchurch.org.uk/

History
- Dedication: St Mary Magdalene

Administration
- Province: York
- Diocese: Southwell and Nottingham

Clergy
- Rector: Revd. H. F. Chantry
- Priest: Revd. George Knowles

St Mary Magdalene’s church in Hucknall, Nottinghamshire, is a parish church in the Church of England dedicated to Jesus' companion Mary Magdalene. The church is Grade II* listed as it is a particularly significant building of more than local interest.

== History ==
The church is set in a peaceful churchyard overlooking the market place in the centre of the town. The building itself is of great architectural interest and is built on the site of an old Saxon church. The church tower which stands high above the town was constructed in stages between the 12th and 14th century whilst the porch was built in 1320. The medieval church consisted only of a chancel, nave, north aisle and tower but it was considerably enlarged in the Victorian period. The top stage of the tower is 14th-century, as is the south porch.

The rest of the building is the result of extensive restoration work which began in 1872. The south aisle was added by Evans and Jolly between 1872 and 1874, and the transepts by Robert Charles Clarke in 1887 and 1888. In 1888 the Lady Chapel was re-built, a beautiful example of 19th-century craftsmanship. The Victorian baptistery which used to contain the 14th-century font has now been converted into a visitor centre where display boards and wall panels provide information about the church. There are also many carvings and wall mosaics around the church.

In 2004, there was a carved stone cross, a Khatchkar, given to the church in memory of the work that the rector had done for Armenia. The stone which had been at Holgate School was given in thanks for the British people's contributions which enable the rebuilding of Lord Byron School in Gyumri which had been destroyed by an earthquake in 1988. It was thought that the original stone may have been damaged by football fans who confused Armenia with Albania.

=== Stained glass windows ===
There are 25 stained glass windows by Charles Eamer Kempe, most of which were added during the 1880s. The church holds one of the largest collections of stained glass by this artist.

=== Painting ===
There is a picture of Christ and the woman taken in adultery by Daniel Maclise dating from 1869.

=== Bells ===
St Mary Magdalene has a ring of eight bells (12 cwt) installed in 1958 and a 14th-century Angelus bell, given to the church by the poet Lord Byron. The Angelus bell has an unknown weight because it is so old the ringers are afraid of it breaking if it were moved from the tower.

Bell weight tuning

 Treble 4-0-22 F#    
 2nd 4-1-14 E#    
 3rd 4-3-16 D#    
 4th 5-2-0 C#    
 5th 6-2-8 B 
 6th 7-1-6 A#  
 7th 9-1-12 G#
 Tenor 12-2-16 F#  To the Glory of God
 Angelus Bell  C#

=== Clock ===
A clock was installed in 1685 by Richard Roe.

The current mechanically driven clock with a face on all four sides of the tower dates from 1884, and has to be wound once a week. The clock has three weights, one for keeping time, one for the chimes and one for the clock faces. The chimes chime the 5th, 6th and 7th bells. It was presented by the William Cavendish-Bentinck, 6th Duke of Portland and built by G. & F. Cope of Nottingham at a cost of £400 (equivalent to £42,975 in 2025). It was started on 4 March 1884

=== Organ ===
The church had a pipe organ by Nigel Church installed in 1976. This was later sold to Sedbergh School for their chapel and an electronic organ was installed in 1992.

=== Organists ===
- Charles Pickard ???? - 1924 (afterwards organist of Holy Trinity Church, Lenton)
- Frank Slater
- Stanley Turner 1932 - ????
- Norman Silcock 1957-c.1970 A blind organist, his guide dog used to sit behind the console at services. The first piece he played on arrival was also the last piece he played at his retirement - Finlandia (Sibelius). His retirement gift was a Braille music typewriter.

== Group of Parishes ==
It is in a group of parishes which includes:

- Church of St John the Evangelist, Butler's Hill
- Church of St Mary Magdalene, Hucknall
- Church of St Peter and St Paul, Westville

== Burials ==
=== Byron family ===
St Mary Magdalene served as the traditional burial place of the Byron family who maintained a family vault there. Most Lords Byron are buried in it, including the poet. His daughter Ada, Countess of Lovelace, also rests in the vault. There is a modest memorial to Lord Byron in the church.

=== Others ===
Other notable people buried in and near the church include:

- Ben Caunt (1815–1861), boxer
- Zechariah Green (1817–1897), philanthropist

== Gallery ==
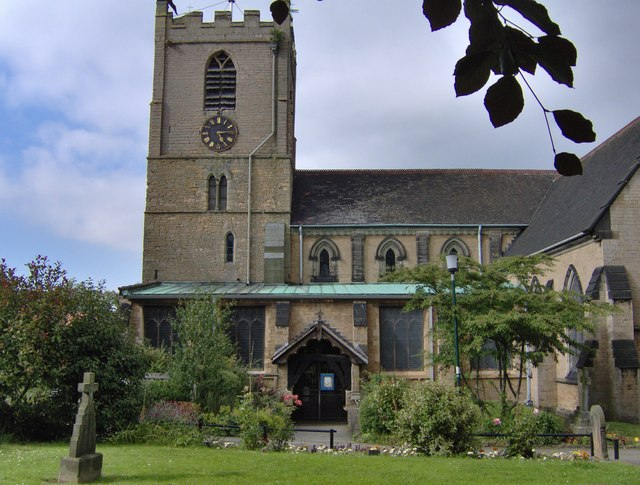

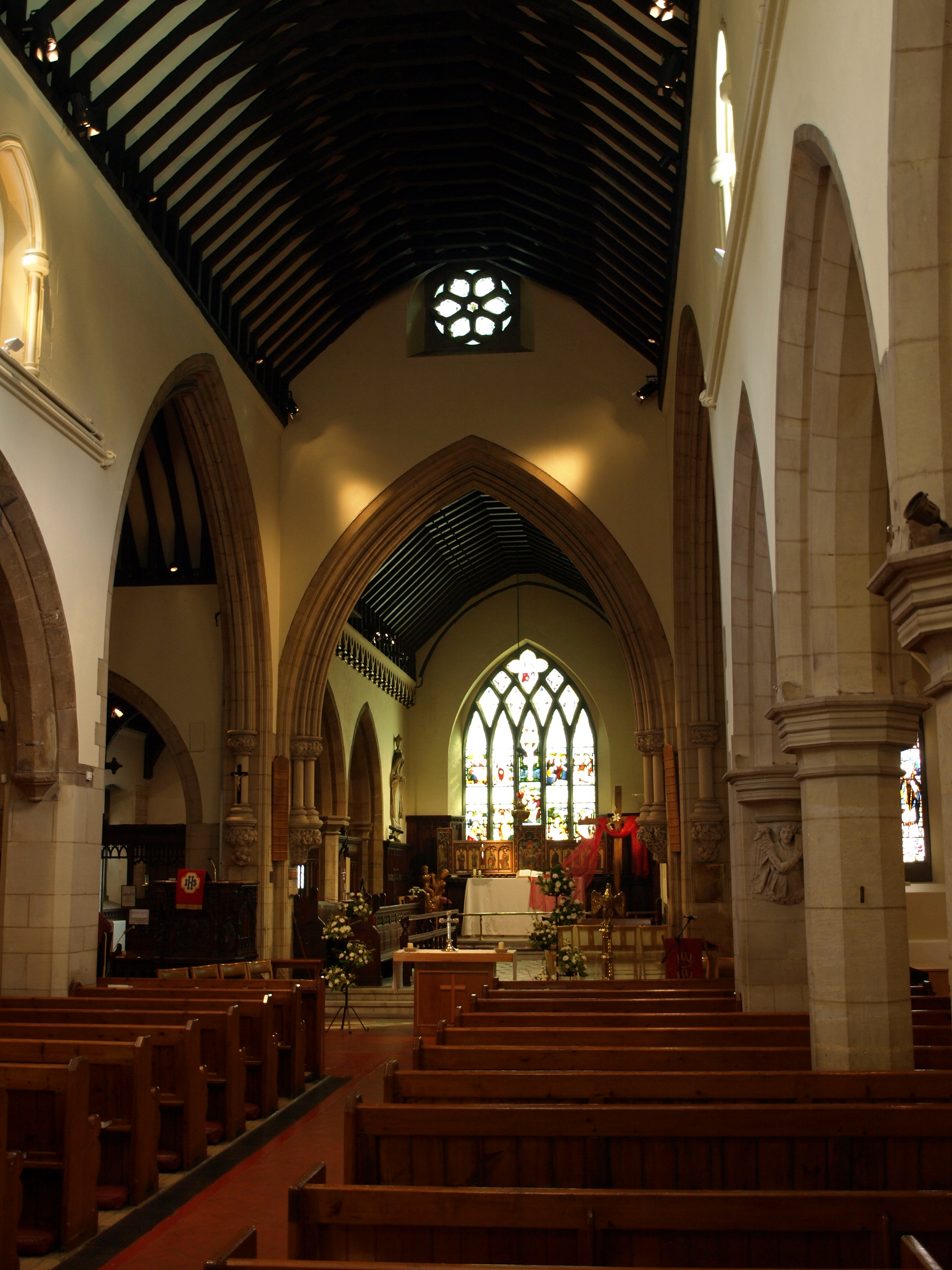

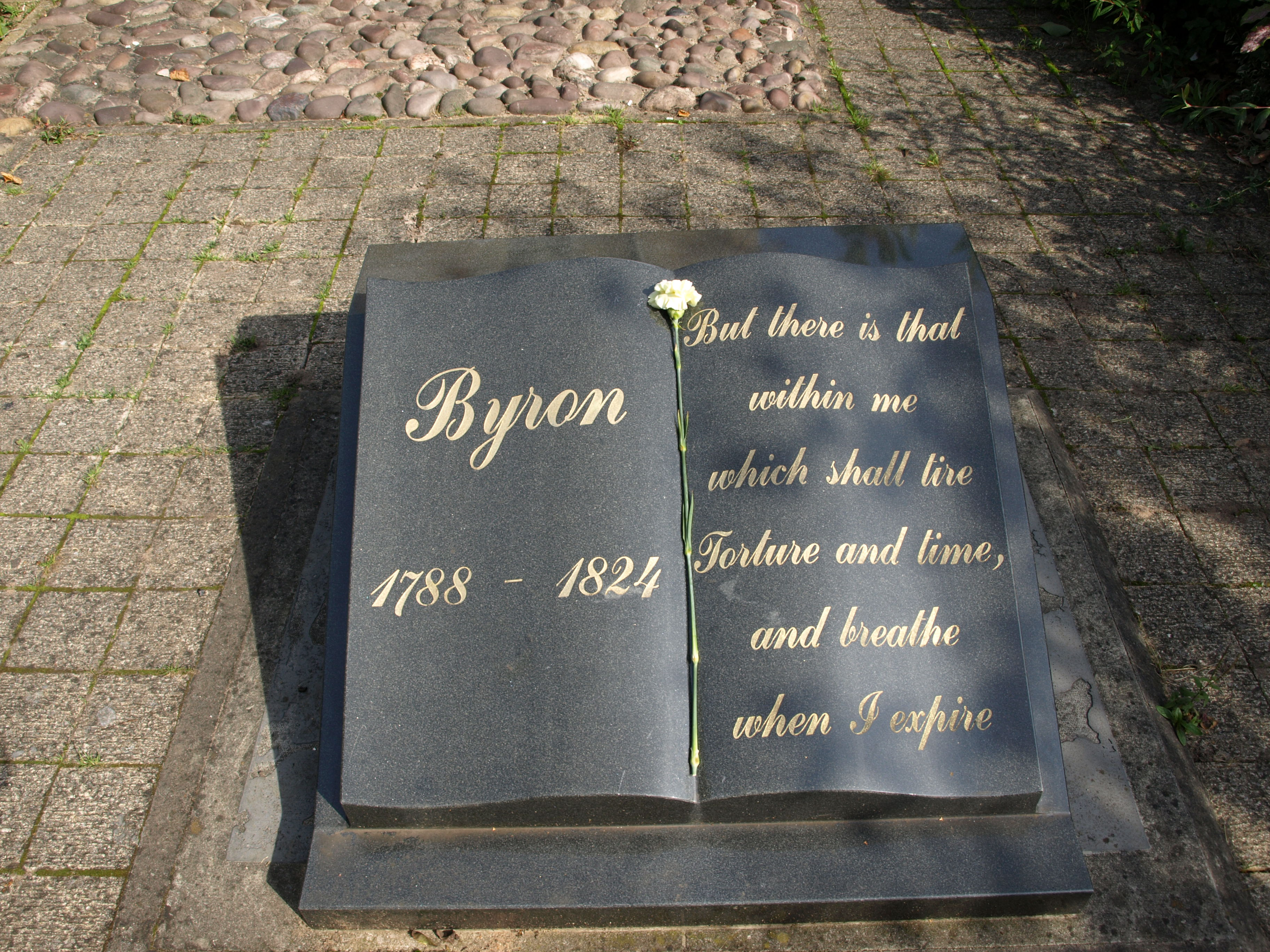

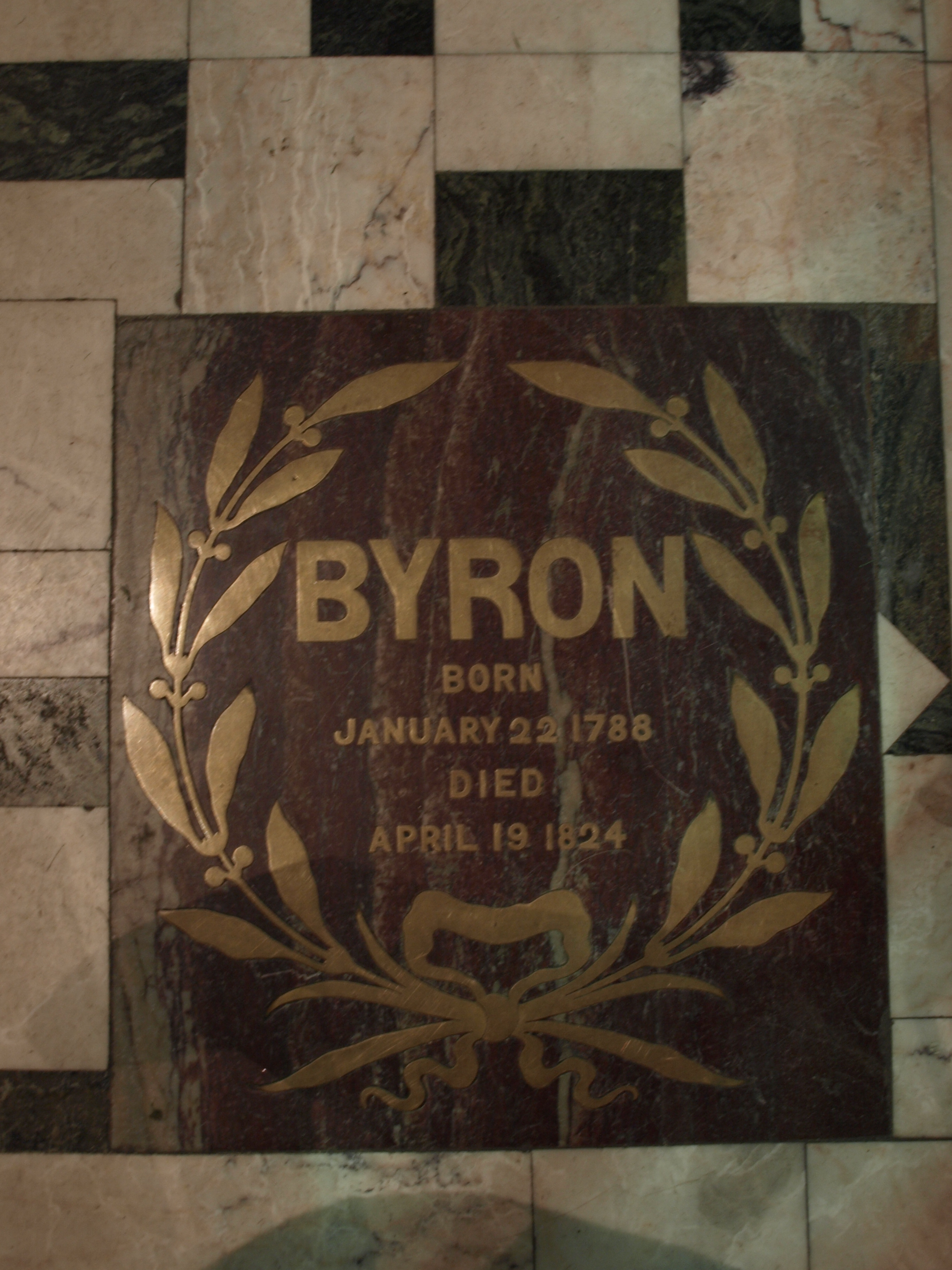

== See also ==
- Grade II* listed buildings in Nottinghamshire
- Listed buildings in Hucknall
