= Robert Charles Clarke =

English architect (1843–1904)

- Born: 1843
- Died: 16 February 1904 (aged 60–61); Bleasby, Nottinghamshire, England
- Occupation: Architect
- Spouse: Fanny Tinkler (m. 1882)
- Father: Robert Clarke

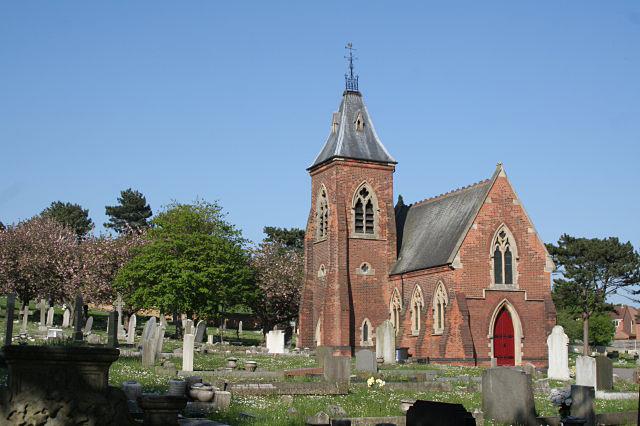
The chapel, Carlton Cemetery, 1885-86

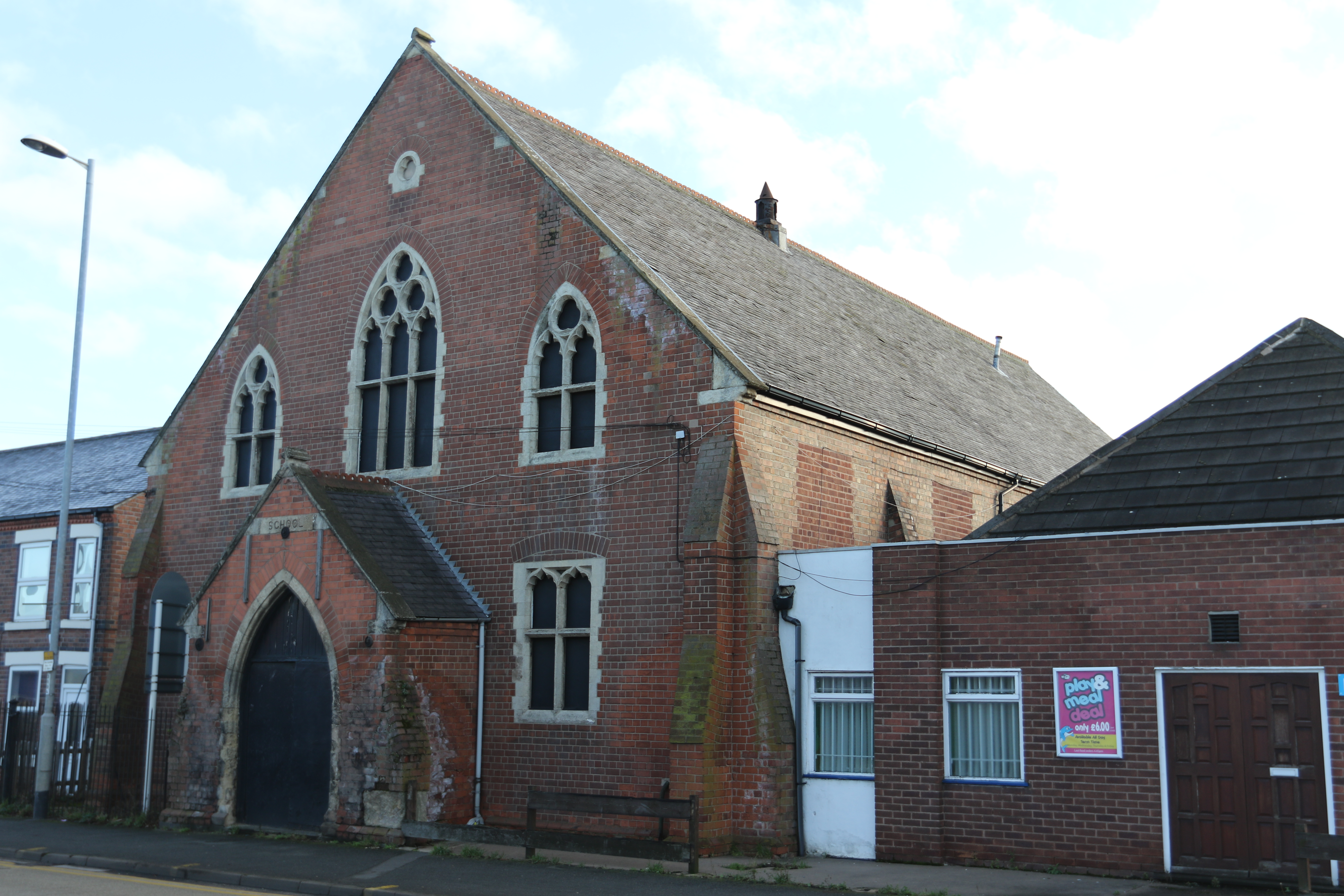
Beeston Church School, 1900

Robert Charles Clarke (1843 – 16 February 1904) was an architect based in Nottingham.

== History ==
He was born in 1843, the son of Robert Clarke and went into business with his father to form Robert Clarke & Son.

He married Fanny Tinkler on 27 March 1882 at St Guthlac's Church, Branston, Leicestershire.

He died on 16 February 1904 at Goverton Villa, Bleasby, Nottinghamshire. He left an estate of £1,052 (equivalent to £143,200 in 2023) to his widow, Fanny Clarke.

== Works ==
- St John's Church, Worksop 1869 (with Robert Clarke)
- Carlton Board Schools, Nottingham 1878
- Carlton Cemetery gates, chapel and ancillary buildings 1885–1886 restoration
- Holy Cross Roman Catholic Church, Carlingford Road, Hucknall 1886–1887 (now replaced)
- St Mary Magdalene’s Church, Hucknall 1887–1888 restoration
- St Peter’s Church, Watnall Road, Hucknall 1892 (now demolished)
- St Catharine's Church, Nottingham 1895
- St John’s Church, Butler's Hill, Hucknall 1895 new chancel
- Mundella School (Higher Grade Centre) 1899
- All Saints' Church, Nottingham 1900 Choir Vestry
- Church Schools, Humber Road/Hassocks Lane, Beeston. 1900
