= Church of St John the Evangelist, Hucknall =

Church in Nottinghamshire, England

Coordinates: 53°01′48″N 01°11′44″W

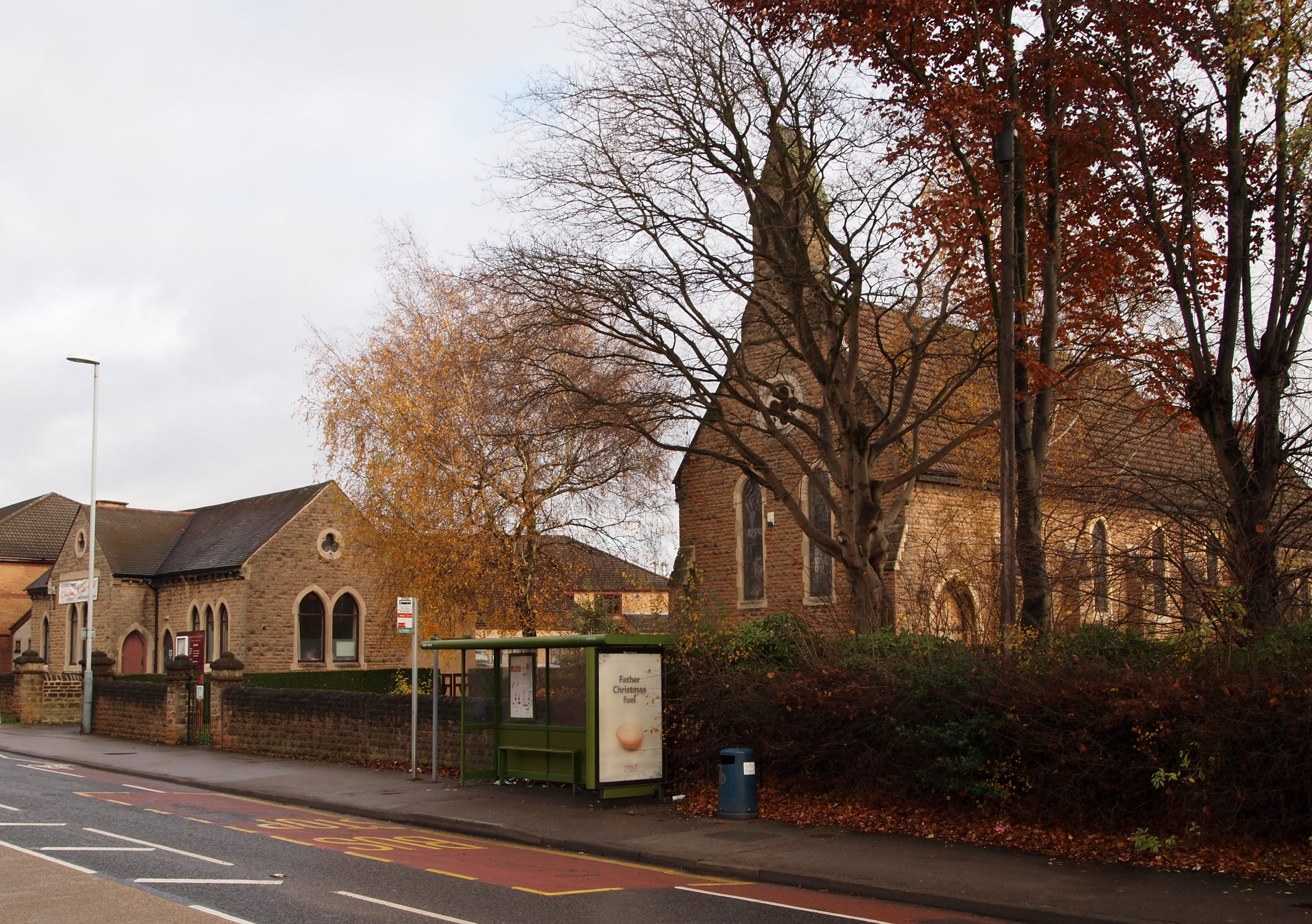
- St John the Evangelist's Church, Hucknall
- Church of St John the Evangelist, Hucknall
- Denomination: Church of England
- Churchmanship: Broad Church
- Website: www.stjohnshucknall.org.uk

History
- Dedication: St John the Evangelist

Administration
- Province: York
- Diocese: Southwell and Nottingham
- Parish: Hucknall

The Church of St John the Evangelist, Hucknall is a parish church in the Church of England in the Butler's Hill suburb of Hucknall, Nottinghamshire.

== History ==
The church was built between 1876 and 1877 on an acre of land at Butler's Hill given by the fifth Duke of Portland. It was designed by the architects Frederick Bakewell and Albert Nelson Bromley using Linby stone with Bath stone facings and brick buttresses. The foundation stone was laid in 1876 and was built at a cost £1,300. It was dedicated on 6 March 1877 by Bishop Tozer, an assistant bishop in the Diocese of Lincoln. It was built to provide for the spiritual needs of the growing number of miners and their families in the Butler's Hill area of Hucknall.

The chancel was added in 1895 to designs by the architect Robert Charles Clarke. The sanctuary was completely refurnished in 1925 when the altar, reredos, and chairs were introduced, as well as a highly carved bishop's chair. Rush-bottomed chairs in the nave date from 1877.

The rood crucifix is unique. Hanging in the chancel arch it bears a rough wooden cross originally on the grave of an ex-member of the congregation killed in the First World War.

Most of the windows are single lancets, although there is a circular quatrefoil above the two at the west end which are in memory of local miners killed in World War II. The east window is the artistic highlight of the church portraying the Crucifixion. It is a memorial to the men of Butlers Hill who died in the Great War.

== List of incumbents ==
- Revd Penny Compton
- Revd David Ford 2011 - current

== Current parish status ==
It is in a group of parishes which includes:

- Church of St John the Evangelist
- Church of St Mary Magdalene, Hucknall
- Church of St Peter and St Paul, Westville
