= The Holgate Academy =

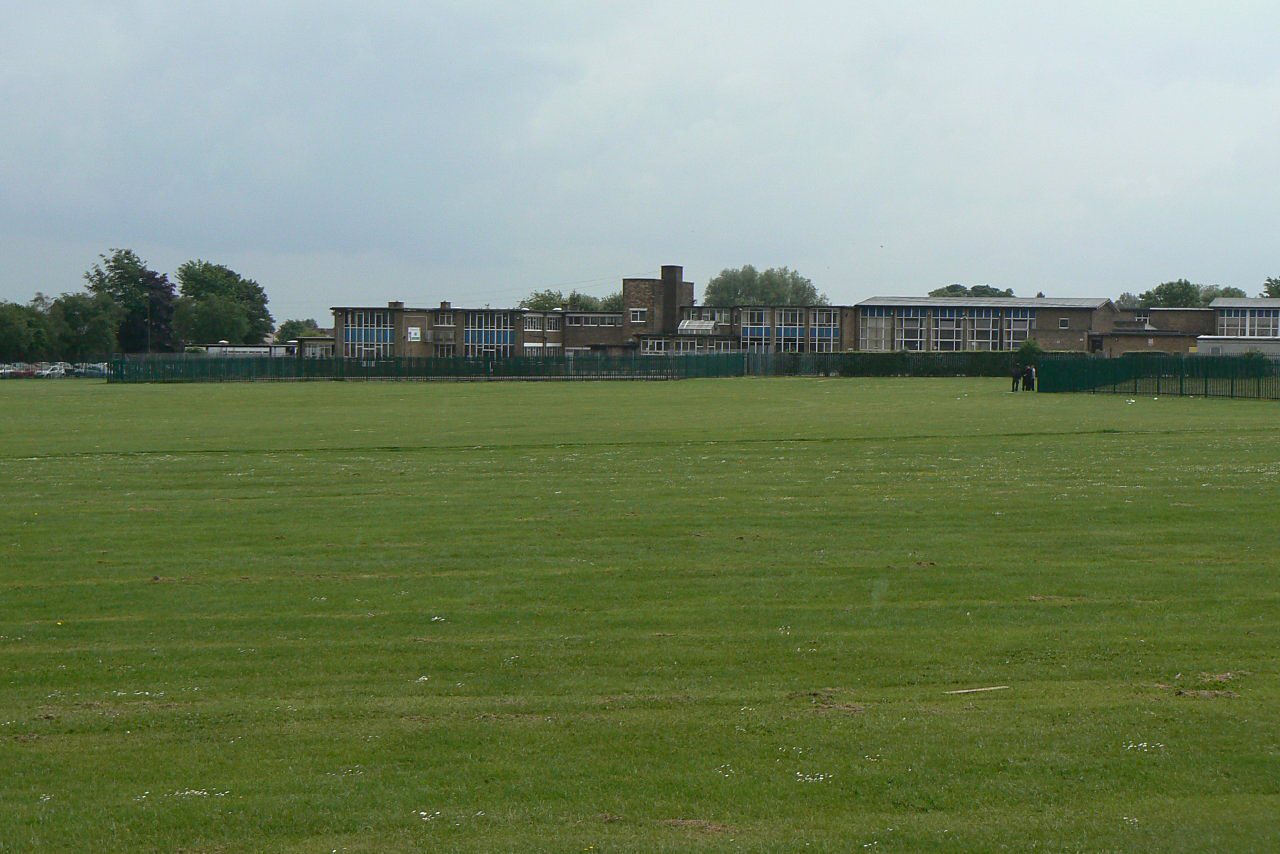

Location
- Hillcrest Drive; Hucknall, Nottinghamshire, NG15 6PX; England; 53.032686°N 1.22708°W

Information
- Type: Academy
- Motto: "Respect For All. Achievement All."
- Established: 1955
- Founder: Annie Holgate
- Department for Education URN: 139956 Tables
- Ofsted: Reports
- Principal: Henry Diamond
- Staff: c.420
- Gender: Coeducational
- Age: 11 to 18
- Enrolment: 993
- Houses: Clumber, Rufford, Sherwood and Thoresby
- Colours: Red (Clumber), Green (Rufford), Yellow (Sherwood), Blue (Thoresby)
- Sixth form: c.130
- Website: http://www.holgate-ac.org.uk/

The Holgate Academy (formerly Holgate School) is a coeducational secondary school and sixth form with academy status, located in Hucknall, Nottinghamshire, England, a former mining community north of Nottingham.

The school's sixth form is part of a collaboration of both the secondary schools in Hucknall, together with Queen Elizabeth's Academy, Mansfield. A carved stone cross (known as a Khatchkar) was placed in the school by the Armenian government as a thank you for the Lord Byron School which was built in Leninakan (now Gyumri) in Armenia following their 1988 earthquake. The carving was replaced in 2004.

== Background ==
The school was not complete in 1955 but the first students attended that year. The school was named after Annie Elizabeth Holgate who had been a teacher but had entered local politics and she became chair of the local education committee. She married Henry and her son Sidney Holgate was to become a noted mathematician and rise to head Grey College in Durham. Two other schools in Hucknall are named after Ms Holgate.

The school had been in special measures due to its poor leadership, behaviour and performance in November 2004 and it was reported that parents were to take legal action against the school for not dealing with bullying effectively. In February 2005, the head teacher resigned and a new head was seconded, initially for a period of one year, from Bramcote Park Business & Enterprise School.

The school was reassessed as "Satisfactory" and was then assessed as "Good" in 2008, although it was noted that the improvement in teaching was not yet reflected in the results and the governing body was "Satisfactory". In 2007 the school successfully attained recognition as a school of Arts and in 2008 took on an Artist in residence, Neil Heath, to inspire the students.

The sixth form did not attract as many students as it should and did not score well in the recent inspection compared with the main school, although this was recognised in future plans.

The school converted to academy status in September 2013 and was renamed The Holgate Academy, forming a constituent member of the Diverse Academies Learning Partnership.

In September 2016, in collaboration with The National Church of England Academy, the academy opened the Hucknall Sixth Form Centre where year 12 and 13 students can continue their studies in a dedicated centre in the heart of Hucknall. In September 2017, students from Queen Elizabeth's Academy, Mansfield also joined the centre, extending this collaboration. All academies are part of the Diverse Academies Learning Partnership.

It is rated Inadequate by Ofsted, with the latest Ofsted report from September 2022 stating, "Staff do not manage behaviour consistently well. Pupils say that their learning is often disrupted by the poor behaviour of other pupils. Pupils report that bullying is frequent. Pupils do not have confidence in staff's ability to tackle bullying effectively. Some pupils say that they feel unsafe."

== Subjects ==
The Holgate Academy offers a range of subjects that give all students access to a broad and balanced curriculum. These include the core subjects of English language and literature, maths and science (including triple science at key stage 4). The academy also offer a number of English baccalaureate subjects, including computing, geography, history and French.

== Linked schools ==
There are seven schools that are identified as feeders to The Holgate Academy, they are:

- Edgewood Primary and Nursery
- Beardall Fields Primary and Nursery School
- Broomhill Junior School
- Holgate Primary and Nursery School
- Leen Mills Primary
- Bestwood Village Hawthorne Primary and Nursery
- Hillside Primary and Nursery

== Catering ==
Like many schools in Britain, Holgate has been trying to improve the quality of its school meals provision especially as part of a reduction in childhood obesity. However it is notable that the schools menu was singled out for comment in the Brunei Times, and the menus are available online. The school menu also made the British press after the school banned take-away food and saw healthy school dinner take-up rise by two hundred per cent in six months. Holgate was also the first school in Nottinghamshire to begin using 'Fingerprint technology' using company “sQuid”, in the catering; this allowed for students to upload money to an account which allowed them to purchase food in the canteens. This system has been heralded for its use against bullying.

== Khatchkar and twinning ==
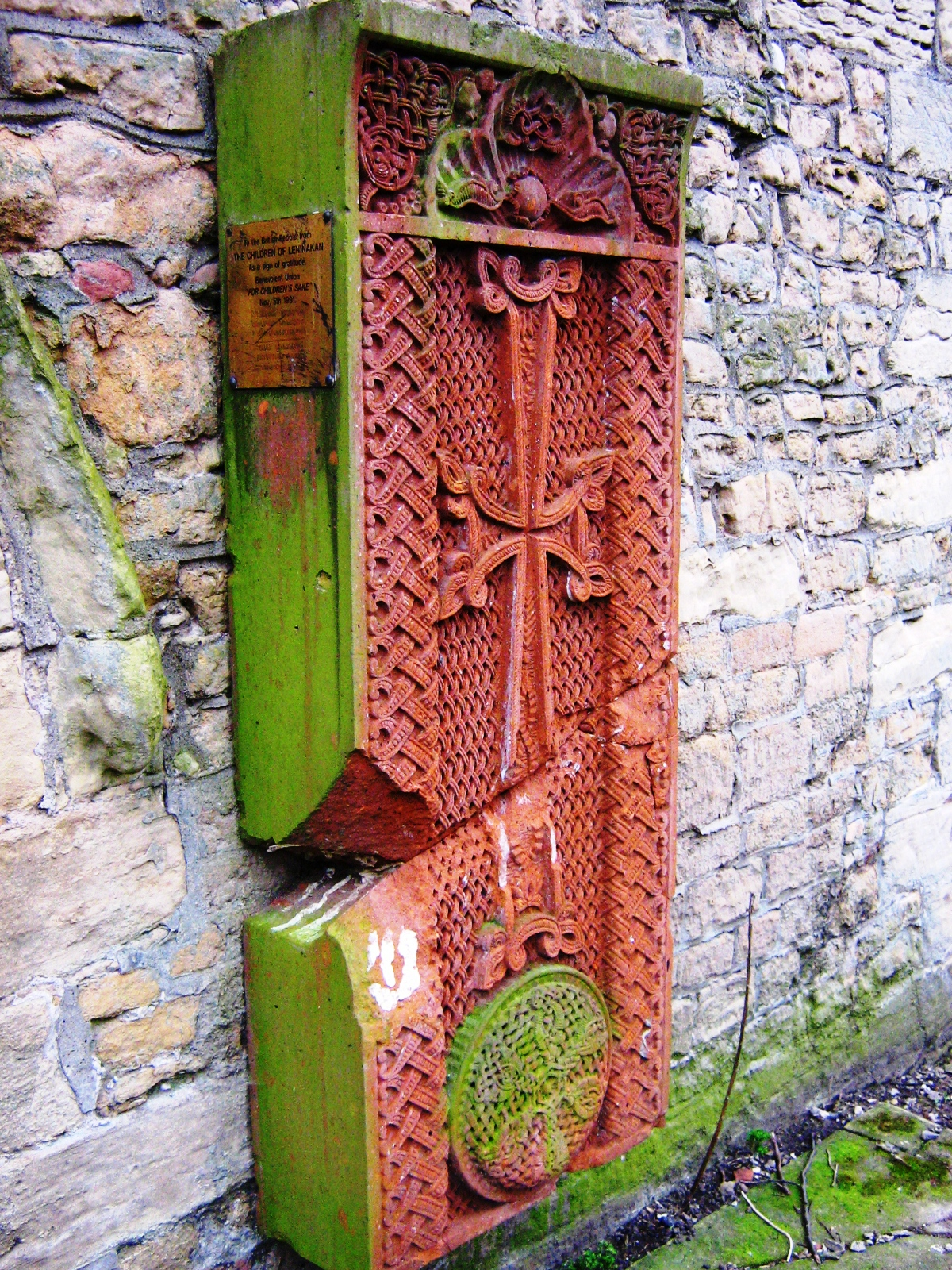
The original Khatchkar that was presented to the school which is now attached to the church in Hucknall.

The school is unusual in having a Khatchkar in its grounds. A Khatchkar is a traditional carved cross which has been used in Armenia since the thirteenth century. The original Khatchkar was placed in the school by the Armenian government in thanks for the Lord Byron School which was built in Leninakan (now Gyumri) in Armenia following their 1988 earthquake at Spitak and opened by Margaret Thatcher. There was a good partnership between the schools largely due to the influence of the rector, Fred Green, from the local St Mary Magdalene church where Lord Byron is buried. The initial reason for the partnership arose because of Lord Byron. Byron was a famous British poet who had shown an affection for Armenian culture when he was a guest of the Mekhitarist Order in Saint Lazarus Island, Venice. The original Khatchkar was installed on 5 November 1991 in a ceremony attended by Kenneth Clarke the then Minister for education. The original stone was irretrievably damaged by vandals in 2000. The Armenian government not only replaced it but also caused the original to be erected at the parish church. The new stone by the original stonemason was installed in 2004 in memory of the rector and his belief that the damage should be seen as a strengthening of faith. It was thought that the original stone may have been damaged by football fans who confused Armenia with Albania.

== Notable former pupils ==
Past pupils of Holgate are known as Old Holgaters.

- Steve Blatherwick, Footballer
- Paris Lees, Transgender rights activist
- Debbie Bestwick, a founder and current CEO of Team17
