= Westville, Nottinghamshire =

Suburb of Hucknall, Nottinghamshire, England

Coordinates: 53.023°N 1.226°W

Westville is a residential area to the west of Hucknall. It is approximately 8 miles (13 km) north-west of Nottingham, England.

It has many new build houses on the former Rolls-Royce site and a Sainsbury's Local, a Co-op store and local takeaways. The nearest Anglican church is the mid-twentieth century Church of St Peter and St Paul.
