= Robert Clarke (architect) =

English architect (1819–1877)

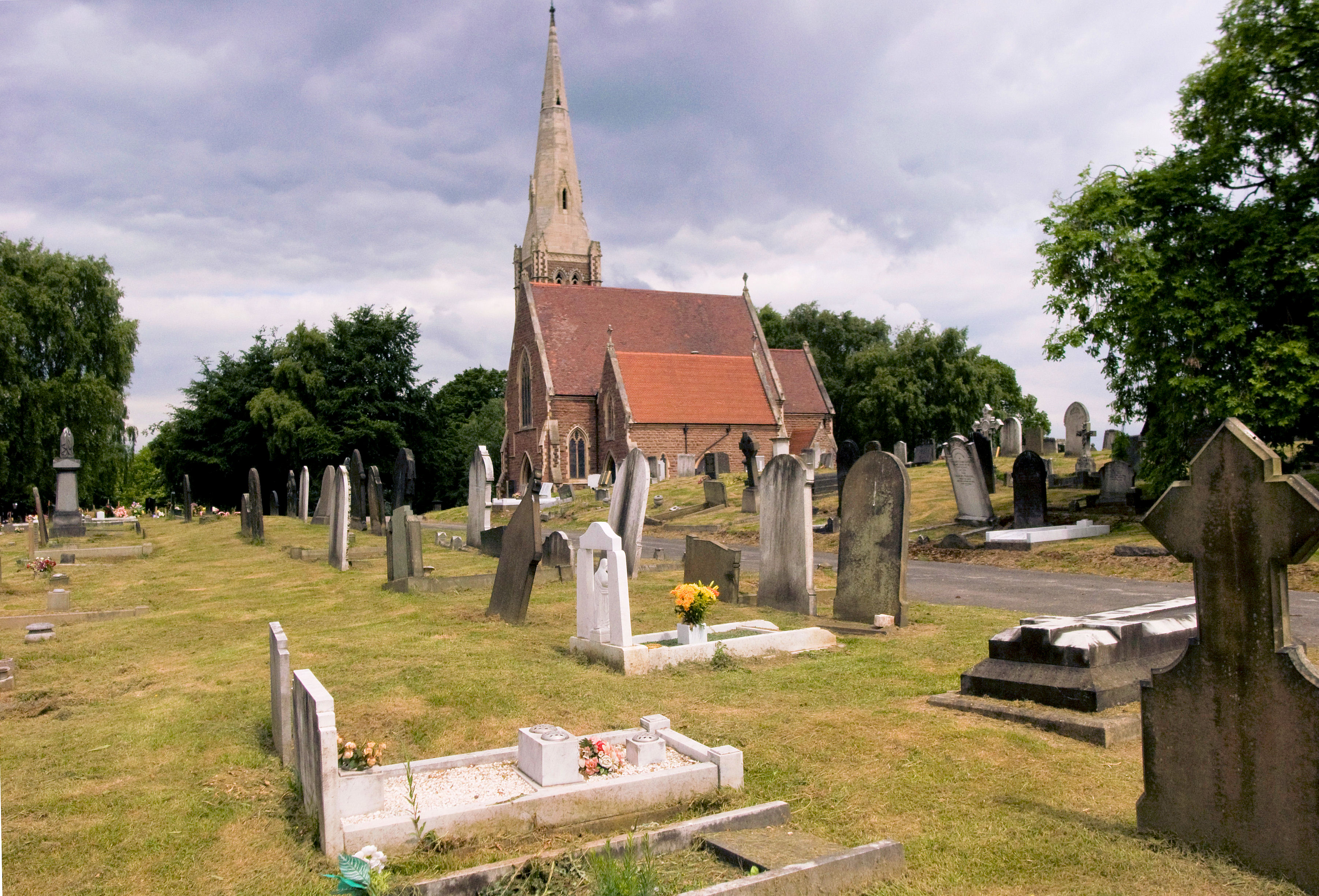
The Witton Cemetery Anglican chapel 1859-60

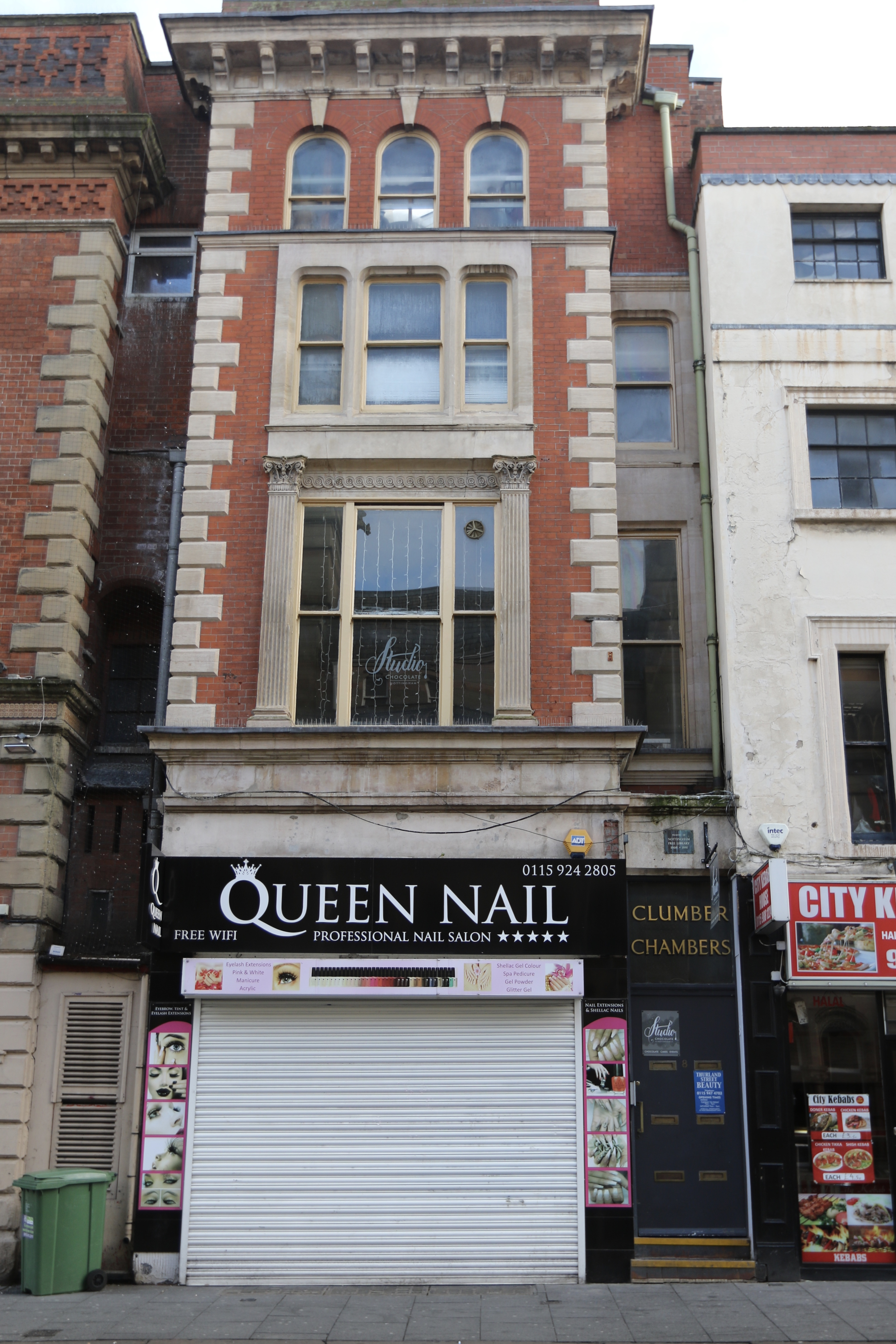
Artisan’s Library, Thurland Street 1854

Robert Clarke (1819 – 11 December 1877) was an architect based in Nottingham.

== History ==
Born in 1819, Robert Clarke was the son of Mr. Clarke of Stoney and Clarke. He married Frances Sympson at St Martin’s Church, Lincoln, on 12 May 1841.

He studied architecture under William Adams Nicholson in Lincoln. He went into a partnership with Edmund Francis Law in Northampton in 1848. This partnership was short-lived, and dissolved on 31 July 1849.

In 1852, he established himself as an independent architect back in Nottingham. He set up in business in Nottingham with offices in Grosvenor Place, Parliament Street. In 1854 he moved to Shakespere Street, opposite Angelo Terrace.

His son, Robert Charles Clarke (1843-16 February 1904) joined his father to form Robert Clarke & Son.

He died on 11 December 1877 in Sneinton, Nottingham and left a small estate to his widow, Frances Clarke.

== Works ==
- Littlemore Lunatic Asylum, Oxfordshire 1843
- Building to house the Bunker’s Hill Weighing Machine, Lower Parliament Street, Nottingham 1852
- Artisan’s Library, Thurland Street, Nottingham 1854
- New Theatre, St Mary's Gate, Nottingham 1854
- Anglican Chapel, Witton Cemetery 1859-60
- Non-conformist Chapel, Witton Cemetery 1859-60 (demolished ca. 1980)
- Nottingham Journal offices, Pelham Street, Nottingham 1860
- Lambert’s Lace Factory, Talbot Street, Nottingham 1863.
- St Ann's Church, Nottingham 1863-64 (demolished 1971)
- St John the Evangelist's Church, Carlisle 1864-65
- St John's Church, Worksop 1869 (with Robert Charles Clarke)
