= Branston, Leicestershire =

Village in Leicestershire, England

Coordinates: 52.856°N 0.798°W

Branston
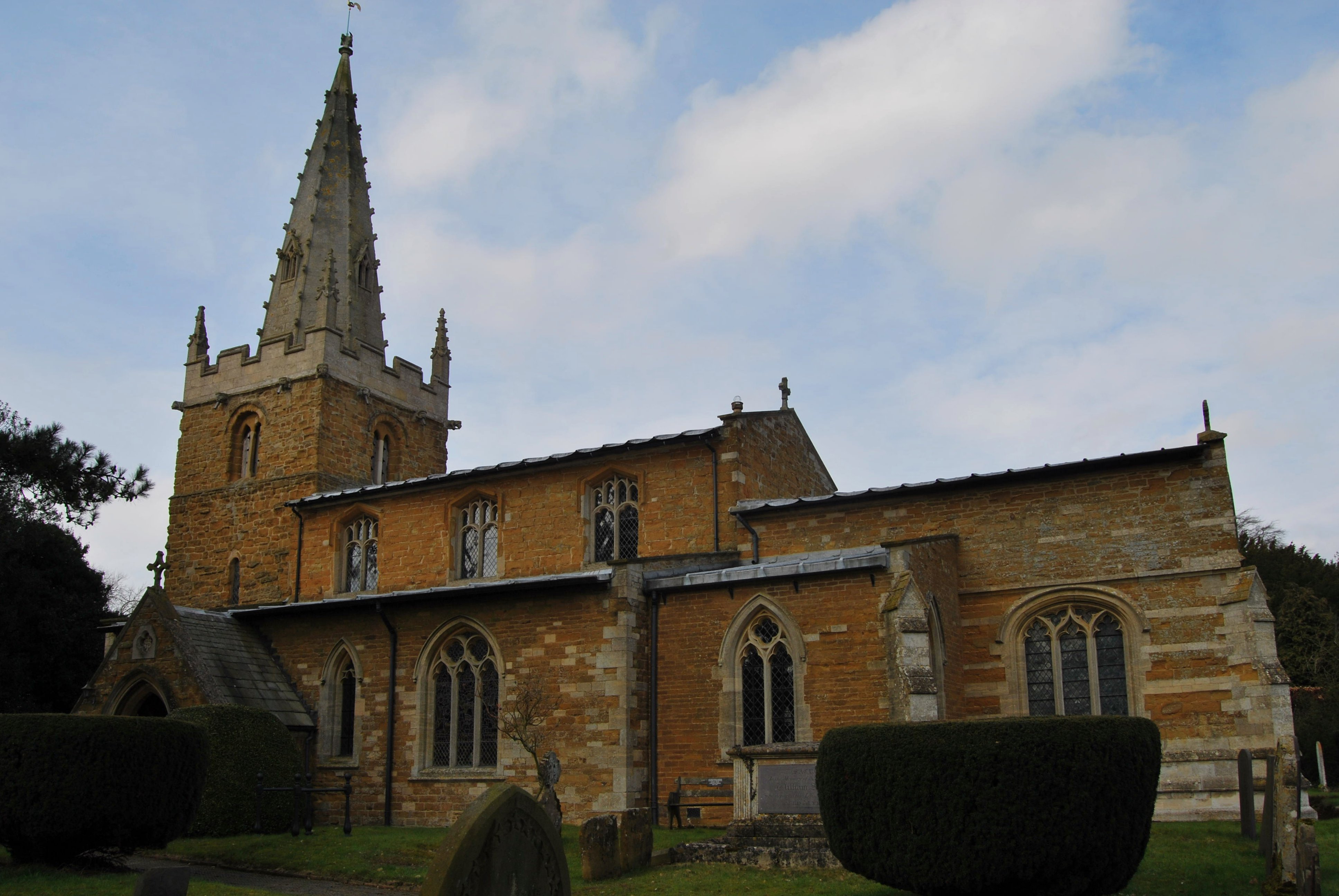
- St Guthlac's Church, Branston

- Location within Leicestershire
- OS grid reference: SK810293
  - London: 95 mi (153 km) S
- Civil parish: Croxton Kerrial
- District: Melton
- Shire county: Leicestershire
- Region: East Midlands
- Country: England
- Sovereign state: United Kingdom
- Post town: GRANTHAM
- Postcode district: NG32
- Dialling code: 01476
- Police: Leicestershire
- Fire: Leicestershire
- Ambulance: East Midlands
- UK Parliament: Melton and Syston

Branston is a village and former civil parish, now in the parish of Croxton Kerrial in the Melton district, in the county of Leicestershire, England. It lies 1 mile (1.6 km) north of the A607 road, 7 miles (11 km) south-west of Grantham and 7 miles north-east of Melton Mowbray, on the southern edge of the Vale of Belvoir, 3 miles (5 km) south-west of Belvoir Castle. Knipton Reservoir is 700 yards (640 m) to the north. In 1931 the parish had a population of 249.

== History ==
According to A Dictionary of British Place Names, Branston could be "a farmstead or a village of a man called Brant" – "Brant" from an Old English person name and "ton" for "enclosure, farmstead, village, manor, [or] estate".

In the 1086 Domesday account Branston is referred to as "Brantestone" in the Framland Hundred of north-east Leicestershire. It had 21 households, 10 villagers, 1 smallholder 6 freemen and 4 slaves, with a meadow of 16 acres (0.1 km^{2}) and 2 mills. In 1066 Leofnoth of Branston was Lord of the manor; after 1086 this transferred to Ralph of Kimcote, with the Bishop of Lincoln becoming Tenant-in-chief.

The Parish Register of 1732 calls itself "A true register of all the Births, Burials & Marriages in Braunston near Croxton Kyriall in the County of Leicester in the sixth year of the reign of King George the second".

On 1 April 1936 the parish was abolished and merged with Croxton Kerrial.

The Grade II* listed St Guthlac's Church, Branston originated in the 13th century, with alterations up the 15th. New chancel and nave roofs were added in 1895–1896 by George Frederick Bodley and Thomas Garner, Gothic Revival architects. Further Grade II listed buildings are three 18th-century farmhouses, the early 19th-century Old Rectory, and the Village Hall dating from 1843.

== Quarrying ==
Iron ore was quarried in two areas near Branston. The first quarry was north of the village on the east side of the Barkestone Road. Ore was first obtained in 1915 and the quarrying worked its way southwards and then northwards again, a little to the east, back to a point close to where it started. The quarries closed in 1949. The ore was carried by narrow-gauge tramway to the tipping dock at the terminus of the Great Northern Railway's Eaton Branch Railway, from where it was taken away by railway. The quarries were worked at first by hand with the aid of explosives. A steam digger was introduced in 1923 and diesel diggers in 1936. The tramway was worked by steam locomotives.

There was a second set of quarries to the west of the village on either side of the Eaton Road. Quarrying began on the south side of the road close to Eaton Grange in 1922 and finished close to the road leading to Lings Hill in 1951. In 1952, new quarries were opened on the north side of the road, working towards the village. The last ore was obtained in 1957. The ore was taken away by a second narrow-gauge tramway via Eastwell and trans-shipped onto the main railway near Harby. A bridge had been constructed on the road to Lings Hill ready for the tramway to reach a new quarry east of the road, but this quarry was never started. Quarrying was first done with the aid of steam diggers; diesel machines were introduced in 1936.
