= St Catharine's Church, Nottingham =

St Catharine's Church
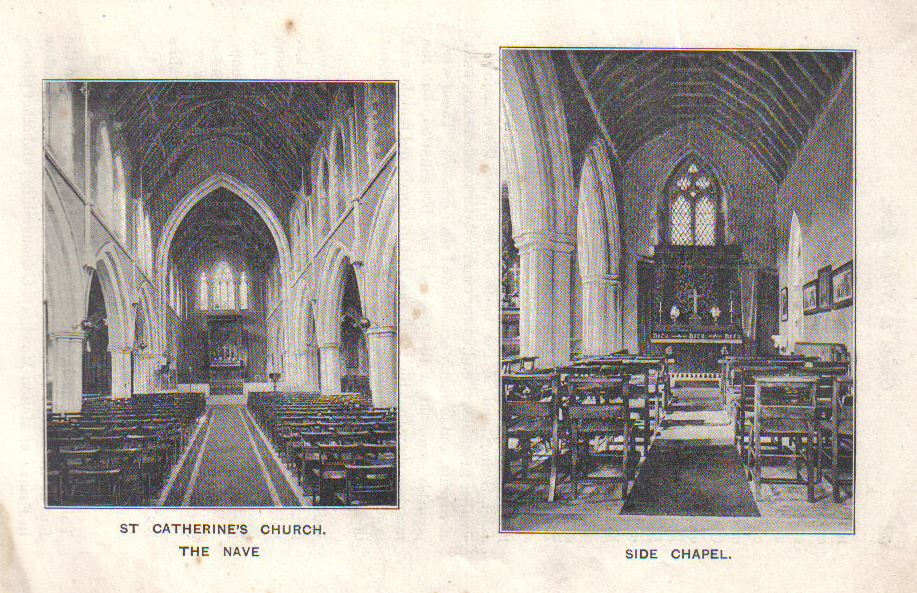
- St Catharine's Church, Nottingham from the Illustrated Guide to the Church Congress 1897

- 52.9615°N 1.1393°W
- Location: Nottingham
- Country: England
- Denomination: Christ-Citadel International Church
- Previous denomination: Church of England
- Churchmanship: Anglo Catholic

History
- Dedication: St Catharine
- Consecrated: 26 November 1896

Architecture
- Architect: Robert Charles Clarke
- Groundbreaking: 23 July 1895

Specifications
- Length: 113 feet (34 m)
- Width: 48 feet (15 m)
- Height: 53 feet (16 m)

Administration
- Province: York
- Diocese: Southwell and Nottingham

St Catharine's Church, Nottingham, was a parish church in the Church of England in Nottingham.

== History ==
The ecclesiastical parish was formed in 1884 out of the parishes of St Mary, St Mark, St Luke and St Paul. The foundation stone for St Catharine's was laid on 23 July 1895 and built to designs of the architect Robert Charles Clarke. It was situated on the St Ann's Well Road.

The church was consecrated on 26 November 1896. It was built, in the Early English style, of Bulwell stone with Bath stone dressings, and consisted of chancel, nave, south chapel and a bell turret. The living was a vicarage in the gift of the Bishop of Southwell.

On 16 August 1946 a fire damaged part of the roof of the church and vestry. Due to the post war restrictions on building materials, it was not until May 1947 that the church received a licence to repair the roof.

St Catharine's was declared redundant in 1980 but united with St Mary's Church, Nottingham, and services continued until 2003. The church was then sold by the Diocese of Southwell and Nottingham. Christ-Citadel International Church acquired the building in 2007.

== Incumbents ==
- 1883 Selwyn Charles Freer
- 1889 Sidney Thorold Winkley
- 1894 Claud E. Lewis
- 1904 Arthur Wells Hopkinson
- 1909 Edward Huntly Gordon
- 1914 John Michael Fyvie Lester
- 1933 Wallace Frederick Carlile Clark
- 1937 John Buchanan Fraser
- 1945 Henry Maurice Jenkins
- 1955 Robert Ross Somervell
- 1958 Norman Patterson Thompson
- 1964 David Peter Keene
- 1971 Roland Douglas Seager (Priest in Charge)
- 1974 Peter Tennant Miller (Priest in Charge)

== Organ ==
The first organ was destroyed in a fire in 1946. A second organ by Augustus Gern was acquired from Tockington Manor in 1948 and was installed by Roger Yates. This organ was sold to St Peter and St Paul's Church, Shelford, Notts, in 2003, when St Catharine's closed.

== Sources ==
- Sidney Robinson: The Organ of the Parish Church of St. Catharine's, Nottingham. 1946
- Southwell and Nottingham Church History Project - Nottingham St Catharine - History
