= Zechariah Green =

English philanthropist and healer (1817–1897)

Zachariah Green (1817 (baptised 15 May) – 1897 (buried 22 January)) was a renowned philanthropist and healer.

== Early life ==
He was born in Hucknall, Nottinghamshire, England.

== Career ==
Zachariah Green's charitable work earned him a widespread reputation, he is even reputed to have treated the Lord Mayor of Nottingham.

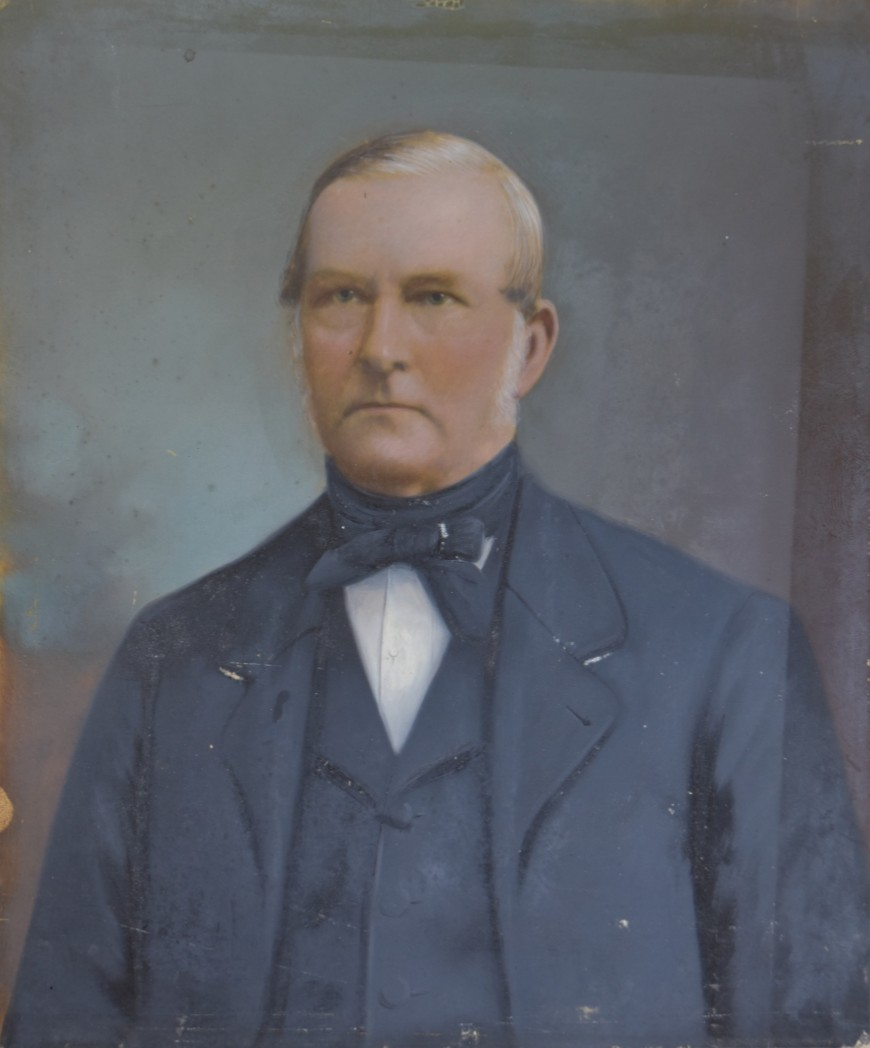

As payment for his services as a healer he demanded only the cost of ointments and medical supplies. As a result of this philanthropy, he became popular with the less affluent inhabitants of Nottinghamshire's industrial towns and villages, who would otherwise have not had access to good medical care.

Green is buried in the Parish Church of St. Mary Magdalene, Hucknall.

== Legacy ==
After his death, his charitable work was continued into the coal mining era by his son, Samuel (1851–1915) grandson, Zachariah (1892–1932) and granddaughter, Mary (1888–1980).

A memorial, in the form of a granite drinking fountain, which now bears the names and deeds of each family member, was erected to the memory of Zechariah Green in Hucknall Marketplace. The fountain monument was relocated to Titchfield Park, Hucknall, probably in 1922 when the park was opened. The fountain is designated as a Grade II listed building and bears the following inscription:

- Erected by public subscription in memory of ZACHARIAH GREEN. a native of this town, who was gifted in the art of healing and spent his life in alleviating the suffering of his fellow men. Born May 5, 1817. Died January 22, 1897.
