= Church of St Peter and St Paul, Hucknall =

Church in Nottinghamshire, England

Coordinates: 53°01′40″N 01°13′34″W

- Church of St Peter and St Paul, Hucknall
- Denomination: Church of England
- Churchmanship: Broad Church

History
- Dedication: St Peter and St Paul

Administration
- Province: York
- Diocese: Southwell and Nottingham
- Parish: Hucknall

The Church of St Peter and St Paul, Hucknall is a parish church in the Church of England in the Westville suburb of Hucknall, Nottinghamshire.

== History ==
The church was built in 1956 and further extended in 1985. It is a hexagonal-shaped building. It has a total immersion baptistery.

== Current parish status ==
It is in a group of parishes which includes:

- Church of St John the Evangelist, Butler's Hill
- Church of St Mary Magdalene, Hucknall
- Church of St Peter and St Paul
