= Listed buildings in Hucknall =

Hucknall is a market town in the Ashfield district of Nottinghamshire, England. The town and its surrounding area contain 15 listed buildings that are recorded in the National Heritage List for England. Of these, one is listed at Grade II*, the middle of the three grades, and the others are at Grade II, the lowest grade. The listed buildings include houses and cottages, a church, a former mill, a public library, a drinking fountain, a war memorial, a rest home for miners and associated structures, aircraft hangars, and a battle headquarters.

== Key ==
Grade	Criteria
II*	Particularly important buildings of more than special interest
II	Buildings of national importance and special interest

== Buildings ==
Name and location	Photograph	Date	Notes	Grade
Church of St Mary Magdalene; 53.03912°N 1.20590°W		12th century	The church has been altered and much extended during the centuries, mainly in the 19th century. It is built in stone and has roofs of tile, lead and copper. The church has a cruciform plan, consisting of a nave with a clerestory, north and south aisles, a south porch, north and south transepts, a chancel, a Lady chapel and a west tower. The tower has three stages, corner pilasters, buttresses in the top stage, lancet windows, clock faces, coved eaves, an embattled parapet with corner pinnacles and the remains of two gargoyles.	II*
204 Beardall Street, Hucknall; 53.03607°N 1.20348°W	—	Early 18th century	A stone house with coved eaves, and a tile roof with coped gables and kneelers. There are two storeys and two bays. In the centre is a doorway with a rectangular fanlight, the windows are a mix of sashes and casements, and all the openings have splayed lintels and keystones.	II
Forge Mill; 53.01920°N 1.18560°W		1787	A cotton spinning mill and incorporated house, later used for other purposes, it is in stone with quoins, and roofs of slate and tile. There are three storeys and a basement, and nine bays, with recessed two-storey bays at the ends. It contains sash and casement windows, loading doors, hatches, and a wheel opening.	II
Grange Cottages; 53.04759°N 1.18260°W	—	c. 1790	A row of six workers' cottages in red brick, on a stone plinth, with Welsh slate roofs. They are in pairs with gabled porches, and have casement windows with segmental brick heads.	II
71 and 73 Nottingham Road; 53.02722°N 1.19283°W	—	Early 19th century	A pair of stone houses with a pantile roof and shouldered coped gables. There are two storeys and attics, a T-shaped plan, and two bays. On the front is a gabled porch, and most of the windows are Gothick-style casements.	II
The Master Hosier's House and Workshop; 53.04021°N 1.20262°W	—	c. 1840	The house and workshops are in red brick with stone dressings and hipped slate roofs. The house has quoins and eaves brackets on the front. There are three storeys and two bays, and a recessed workshop to the left. In the centre is a round-arched doorway with a fanlight and a keystone. The windows in the house are sashes with wedge lintels, and in the workshop they have segmental heads. The right return has three bays, chamfered eaves, an inserted doorway with a fanlight and a flat head, and sash windows.	II
Hucknall Library; 53.03870°N 1.20545°W		1887–78	The public library is in red brick on a chamfered plinth, with stone dressings, a moulded string course, dentilled eaves and a tile roof with shouldered coped gables and a ball finial. The front has five bays. In the centre is a tower porch with buttresses, pilasters and a pyramidal roof with a weathervane. It contains a doorway with a Tudor arch with a keystone, over which is a frieze, a bracket lamp, two casement windows with keystones, and a tympanum with a coat of arms and the date. To the left is a canted bay window with a balustrade, and to the right are three bays with casement windows, and a dormer with a shaped gable and a segmental pediment. The left return has four bays and a cross-wing.	II
Memorial Drinking Fountain, Titchfield Park; 53.03121°N 1.20300°W	—	1898	The drinking fountain is in red and grey granite on a sandstone plinth. It has a square pedestal with a coved face, and fluted moulded drinking bowls. Above is a square base with corner shafts, and round-headed niches each containing an inscribed tablet. Above is a dated frieze, a cross-pedimented capital, and a domed base carrying a circular cupola with a dome and an iron finial.	II
Hangars 1 and 2, K & M Hauliers; 53.02090°N 1.22359°W	—	1916	The aircraft hangars, later used for other purposes, are in rendered brick with segmental-arched timber Belfast truss roofs that are felted, and have a full-length gabled clerestory. They have a rectangular plan, with 15 bays, and two 100 feet (30 m) spans. The side walls are buttressed, and contain casement windows and doors. At the ends are metal sliding doors.	II
Hangars 3 and 4, K & M Hauliers; 53.02037°N 1.22225°W	—	1916	The aircraft hangars, later used for other purposes, are in rendered brick with segmental-arched timber Belfast truss roofs that are felted, and have a full-length gabled clerestory. They have a rectangular plan, with 15 bays, and two 100 feet (30 m) spans. The side walls are buttressed, and contain casement windows and doors. At the ends are metal sliding doors.	II
Hucknall War Memorial; 53.03148°N 1.20205°W	—	1922	The war memorial is in Portland stone, and consists of a cenotaph column with a moulded base and a Greek key capital on a rectangular base of three steps. On the west side is a bronze cross, and on the east is an inscribed bronze tablet. The war memorial stands in a paved area with a truncated obelisk at each corner with bronze plaques, between which are smaller obelisks joined by linked chains.	II
Houses of Rest for Miners; 53.03326°N 1.20279°W	—	1925	A group of three blocks, each with three bays and a single storey, designed by Reginald Blomfield. They are in brick with stone dressings and tile roofs. The blocks have stone plinths, rusticated quoins, string courses and modillioned eaves. The windows are sashes with keystones. The middle bay of each block projects and has a pediment containing a crest or a round window, and on the roof of the central block is an octagonal cupola with a copper dome, a clock and a finial.	II
Wall and gates, Houses of Rest for Miners; 53.03290°N 1.20260°W	—	1925	The walls enclosing the grounds and the gates were designed by Reginald Blomfield. The walls and gate piers are in stone, the walls are stepped and have ramped coping. The corner and side gate piers are square and have plinths, stepped tops and ball finials. At the southeast corner they are larger with moulded plinths, rebated corners, cornices and ball finials, and between them are patterned wrought iron gates with initials.	II
Battle Headquarters; 53.02216°N 1.22759°W	—	1940	The Battle Headquarters at the former RAF Hucknall consist of an underground command post and tunnel, and an observation tower. The tower is in brick with a square plan, and has three storeys and a parapet roof. It has concrete door lintels, shuttered concrete floors, and a concrete gun mounting to the roof. Steps lead down from it to a tunnel leading to the command post in a rectangular office.	II
Wing test hangar and concrete de-tuner supports 53.02113°N 1.21855°W	—	1944	The hangar was constructed by Rolls-Royce for the testing of aeroplane engines, and the detuner was added in 1958. The detuner no longer exists, but its concrete supports remain, and the hangar is used as a museum. It is in red brick with an H-shaped plan, a flat metal-covered roof, and has small-pane windows with concrete lintels.	II
