= Lord Byron School (Gyumri) =

Coordinates: 40°48′36″N 43°51′00″E

Lord Byron School №20
- (Armenian: Լորդ Բայրոնի անվան թիվ 20 միջնակարգ դպրոց)
- Margaret Thatcher street Gyumri, Shirak; Armenia

Information
- Established: 1950
- Specialist: English
- Head (since 1992): Grigor J. Harutunyan

Lord Byron School №20 (Armenian: Լորդ Բայրոնի անվան թիվ 20 միջնակարգ դպրոց) is a public school in Gyumri (formerly Leninakan) founded in 1990, following the 1988 Armenian earthquake that devastated the city, by funds provided by the British Government as well as donations raised by the British people. A carved stone cross called a Khatchkar was placed at Annie Holgate Comprehensive School, Nottinghamshire, by the Armenian government in thanks for the rebuilding of this school following the 1988 earthquake.

== History ==
The school was built in 1950 and was named after the Armenian playwright Gabriel Soundukyan. The 1988 earthquake occurred at 11:41 local time when most people were either at work or at school.

The Soviet general secretary Mikhail Gorbachev asked for international assistance. The death toll from the quake was 25,000 and the school lost over 40 students and staff.

The rebuilt school was opened by the United Kingdom Prime Minister Margaret Thatcher on 10 June 1990 on her first trip to the Soviet Union. Since then there has been support from Armenians living abroad. A new boiler-house was constructed and a playground were paid for by the Armenian General Benevolent Union.

After the building a partnership was established between Lord Byron School and a school near to Byron's resting place near Nottingham. As a symbol of thanks the government arranged for a khatchkar (traditional Armenian carved stone cross) to be placed in the British school's playground.

== Layout ==
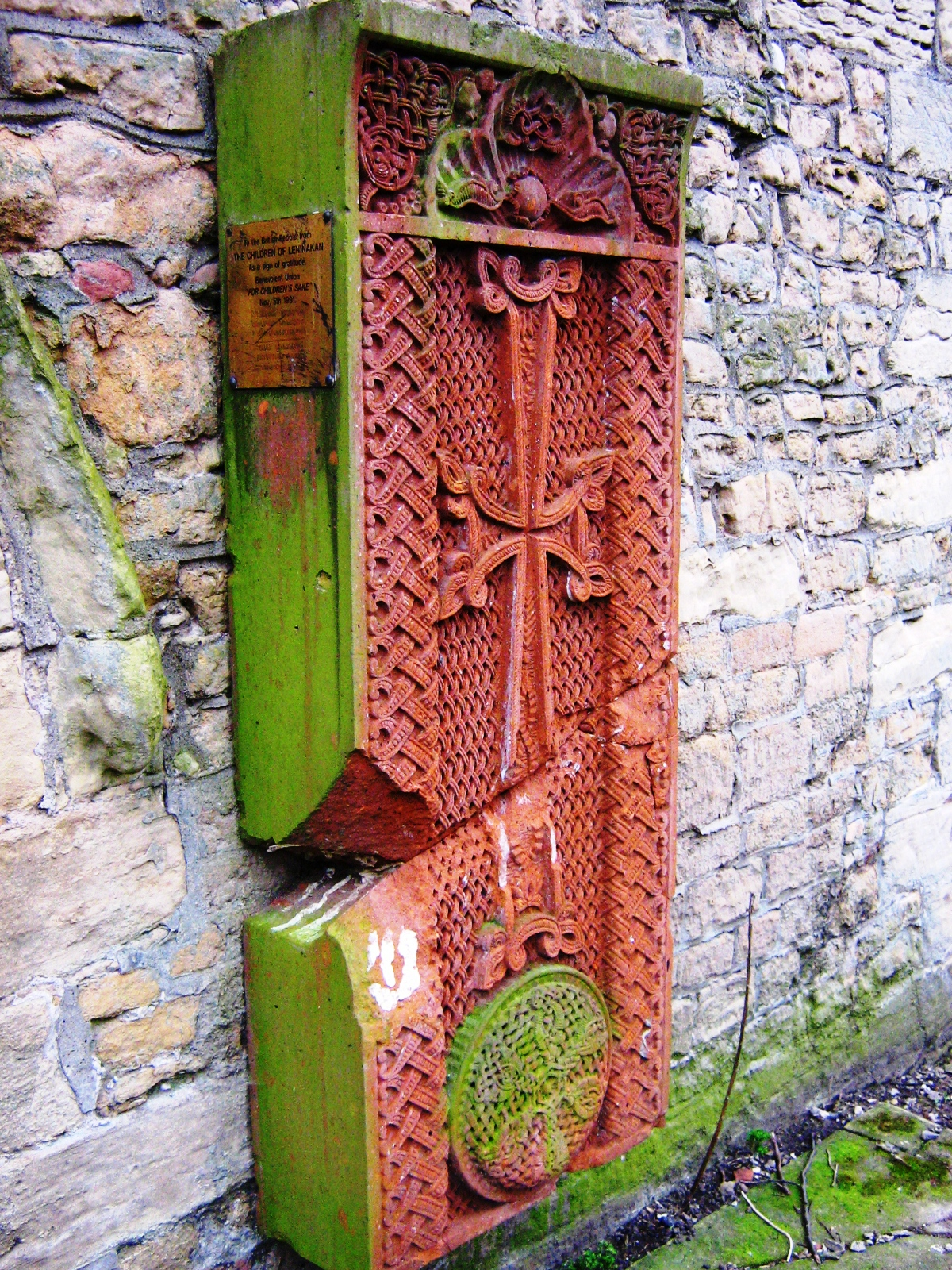
The original Khatchkar that was presented to the school which is now attached to the church in Hucknall where Byron is buried.

The design for the school was by British architects. The materials, furniture and the labour required to construct the school were exported from the United Kingdom. There are six low rise buildings, they were arranged in a two by three grid and the main entrance approached one of the two central buildings. Behind the central building is the craft and dining building. To the left of the administration building is a primary building and behind that a gym. To the right is a building for language study and behind that a combined building for maths and science.

== Curriculum ==
Lord Byron school has a building dedicated to the study of languages and the school specializes in the study of English in particular.

The Byron Day is annually celebrated by the school on January 22.

== Partnerships ==
- Canajoharie Central School, Canajoharie, New York
- The Holgate Academy near Nottingham, UK. This partnership arose because of Lord Byron who was a famous British poet who had shown an affection for Armenian culture when he was a guest of the Mekhitarist Order in Saint Lazarus Island, Venice. A partnership was formed between Lord Byron School and Holgate, another secondary school which was close to Byron's final resting place in Hucknall
