= St John's Church, Worksop =

Coordinates: 53°18′34″N 01°07′23″W

St. John's Church, Worksop
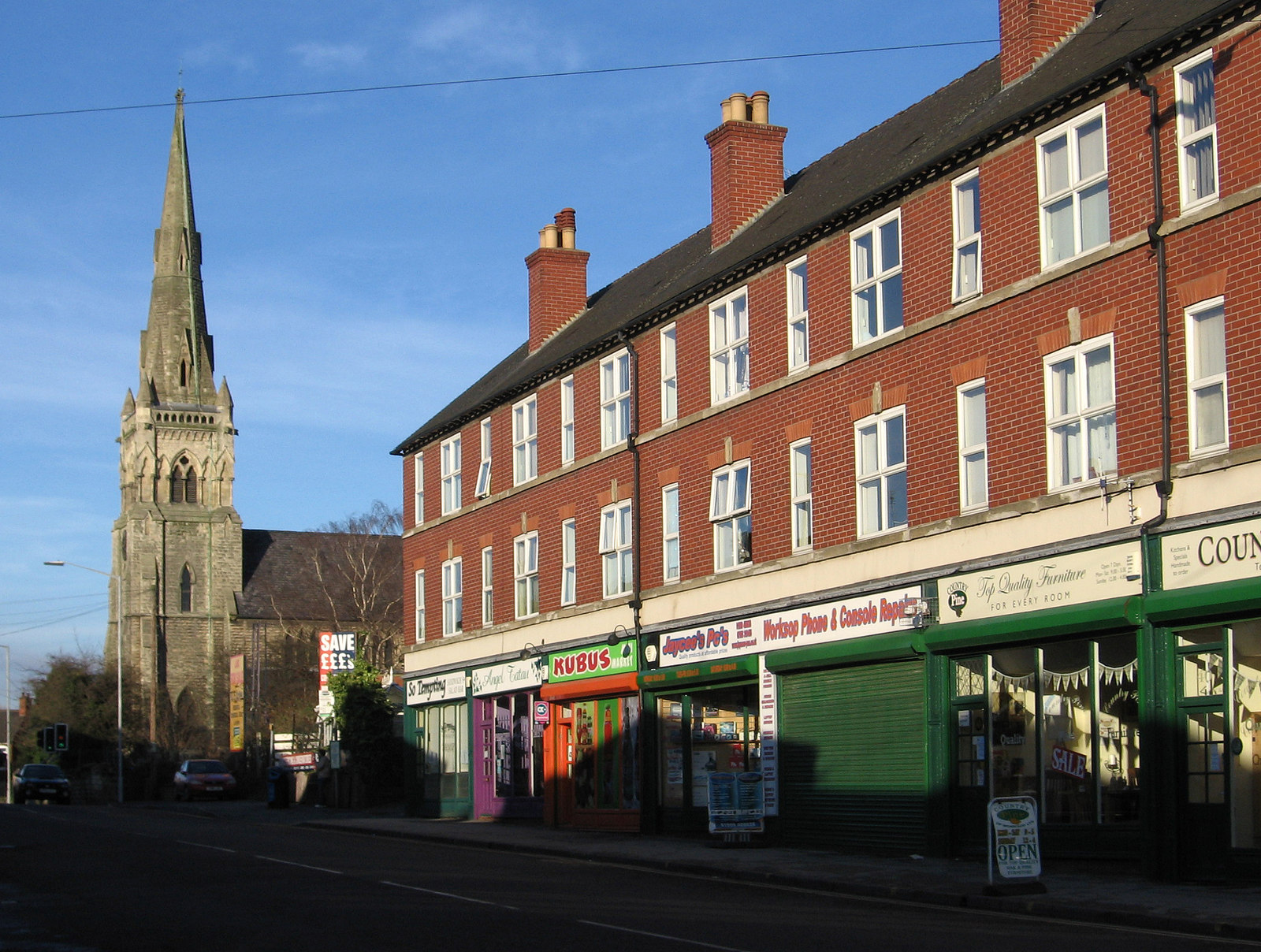
- St. John's Church, Worksop
- Denomination: Church of England
- Churchmanship: Broad Church

History
- Dedication: St. John

Administration
- Province: York
- Diocese: Southwell and Nottingham
- Parish: Worksop

Clergy
- Vicar: Revd Captain Tim Stanford

St. John's Church, Worksop is the parish church of Worksop, Nottinghamshire, England.

== History ==
The church was built between 1867 and 1868 by the architect Robert Clarke and his son Robert Charles Clarke. In September 2019 the Church celebrated its 150th anniversary.

== Incumbents ==
- 1867–1872 Revd Charles Bury
- 1872–1909 Revd George Dobree
- 1909–1930 Revd John Henry Bligh
- 1930–1937 Revd Edwin Arthur Green
- 1937–1946 Revd. Cuthbert Rowland James Hayes
- 1947–1955 Revd John Robert Joughin Kerruish
- 1955–1962 Revd Jack Richard Hassett
- 1962 – c.1975 Revd Canon Robert Purdon Neill
- c.1975 – c.1985 Revd Albert Brown
- c.1985–1990 Revd Bruce Hunt
- c.1991–2000 Revd Glynn Jones
- 2001–2011 Revd Neil Hogg
- 2013–2021 Revd Tim Stanford

== Organ ==
The church has an organ by Brindley & Foster dating from 1869. The specification of the organ can be found on the National Pipe Organ Register

== See also ==
- Listed buildings in Worksop
