= Butler's Hill =

Residential area in United Kingdom

Coordinates: 53.029°N 1.192°W

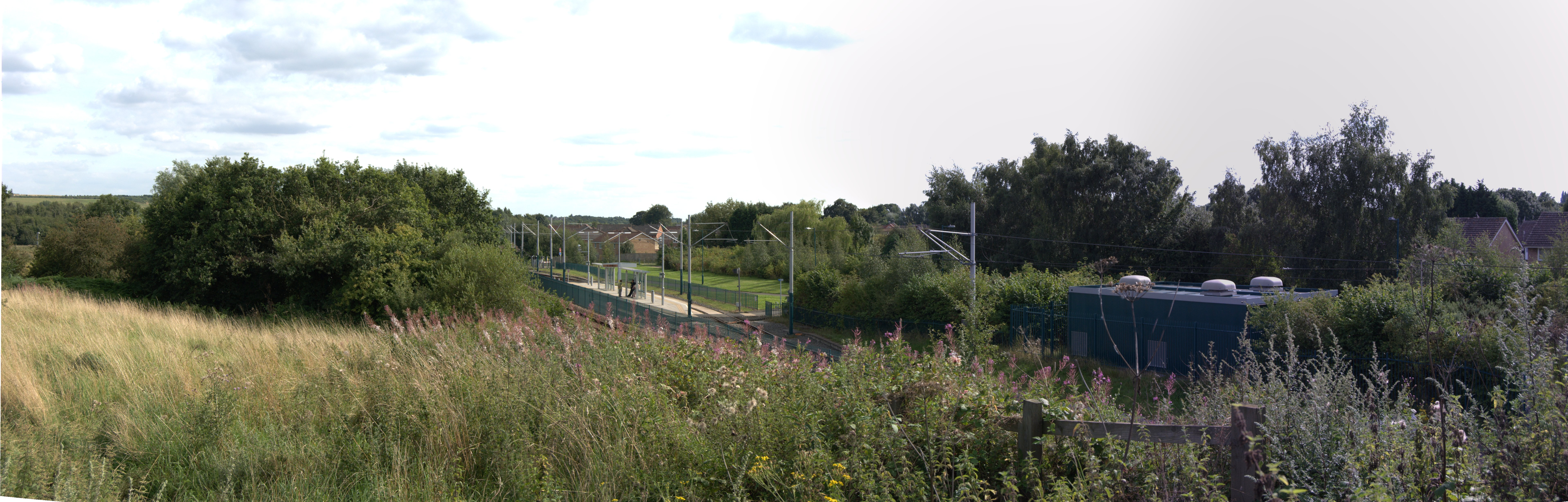
Panorama of Butlers Hill tramstop

Butler's Hill is a residential area near to the town centre of Hucknall. It is approximately seven miles north-west of Nottingham, England.

The Butler's Hill tram stop is adjacent to Butler's Hill, and is on the Hucknall branch of the Nottingham Express Transit.

The former Butler's Hill railway station, was situated on the, now closed, Great Northern Railway's Nottingham to Shirebrook line. The former Midland Railway route from Nottingham to Worksop also passed through Butler's Hill, but the Midland never had a station there. The alignment of the Midland line is now shared by the Robin Hood railway line and Nottingham Express Transit.

The footbridge--known locally by its nickname, the 'Tin Bridge'--over the tram stop links Butler's Hill with Bestwood Village via the Mill Lakes, part of Bestwood Country Park. The nearby Broomhill park was the former site of Sherwood Zoo, which went bankrupt in 1976.

The local Anglican church is the nineteenth century Church of St John the Evangelist.
