= Hucknall Sixth Form Centre =

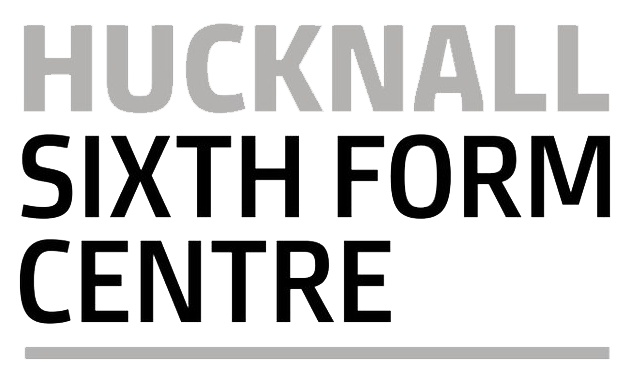

Location
- Portland Road; Hucknall, Nottinghamshire, NG15 7UA; England; 53.036116°N 1.199900°W

Information
- Type: Sixth Form College
- Established: September 2016
- Head teacher: Mr A Brown
- Gender: Coeducational
- Age: 16 to 19
- Website: http://www.hsfc-ac.org.uk/

The Hucknall Sixth Form Centre was a coeducational sixth form centre located in Hucknall, Nottinghamshire, England.

It opened in September 2016 and was home to the collaborative sixth form of The National Academy, The Holgate Academy and Queen Elizabeth's Academy.
