= The National Academy =

The National Church of England Academy

Location
- Annesley Road; Nottingham, Nottinghamshire, NG15 7DB; England
- 53.04681°N 1.21593°W

Information
- Type: Academy
- Motto: Life in all its fullness
- Religious affiliation: Church of England
- Established: 1788; 238 years ago
- Local authority: Nottinghamshire
- Department for Education URN: 137159 Tables
- Ofsted: Reports
- Chair: K Cowley
- Head teacher: M Brailsford
- Gender: Coeducational
- Age: 11 to 19
- Enrolment: 1069 (Senior School) and 130 (Sixth Form)
- Colours: Blue and Gold
- Website: www.nationalce-ac.org.uk

The National Church of England Academy, formerly known as The National School, is a Church of England secondary school in the Ashfield district of Nottinghamshire, England.

== History ==
The National Academy was a co-member of the National Tuxford Learning Community (NTLC), a non-statutory federation of the National CE and Tuxford Schools. Since this collaboration began in 2007, several other schools/academies have joined, and NTLC has been renamed Diverse Academies Trust. The name reflects the ethos of the collaboration; member schools work closely together, sharing good practice while retaining (and celebrating) their individuality and diversity. The school was given Academy Status on 1 August 2011. The academy left the Diverse Academies Trust in 2019.

== School campus ==
The school was built in two phases, in the late 1970s and early 80s. A purpose built science block was added in 2004. Playing fields look out onto open land beyond the northern edge of the town. The buildings have been well maintained; recently, the school was awarded funds by the EFA to upgrade heating, roofing, and security. The site is landscaped and green.

== Academic performance ==
In 2016, the school's performance was above the national average at both Key Stage 4 and 5. At Key Stage 5, there was a 100% pass rate; 79% of grades were A*-C; 56% were A*-B and 36% were at grade A*/A.

== See also ==
- The Holgate Academy
- Hucknall Sixth Form Centre
