= Birds Bakery =

Bakery chain in the United Kingdom

Birds (Derby) Limited
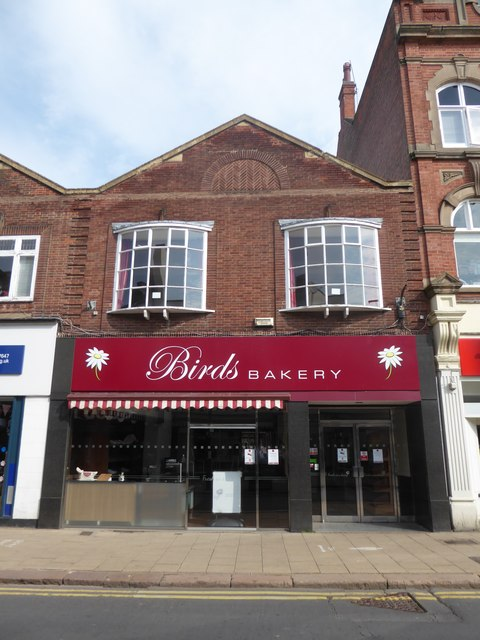
- Branch in Burton upon Trent
- Company type: Private
- Industry: Food (Bakery Group)
- Founded: 1919; 107 years ago
- Founders: Frank, Thomas and Reginald Bird
- Headquarters: Derby, England, UK
- Number of locations: 65
- Products: Sandwiches, pies and pastries; baked goods
- Website: birdsbakery.com

Birds Bakery is a bakery chain based in Derby, England. As of October 2019 the chain has 65 outlets across the Midlands.

== History ==
Birds was founded by Frank, Thomas and Reginald Bird after they purchased Peach's bakery and pork butchers on Upper Dale Road in 1919. Eight years later they opened their second shop on Normanton Road and continued to expand across the town. When the last of the three brothers, Frank Bird, died in 1951, the bakery was taken over by two more members of the family, Reg and Paul Bird.

In 1971, production was moved to a new building at Ascot Drive with their previous headquarters being demolished, and by 1972 Birds employed 300 people and operated 18 retail shops. In 2017 the 60th Birds shop opened in Sinfin and the chain is continuing to expand, with 65 outlets as of October 2019.

== Controversies and incidents ==
In 2020, Megan Metcalfe, who was the Store Manager of the Radcliffe-on-Trent branch, was sacked for gross misconduct after she accepted cash payments from elderly customers without bank cards during the COVID-19 pandemic. This led to a petition being created calling for Ms Metcalfe, an employee with over 40 years of service to Birds, to be re-instated or compensated, which as of 3 August 2020 has over 13,000 signatures.

In 2026, the company faced what BBC News described as a "backlash" after hundreds of customers alleged the quality of Birds' pork pies had deteriorated; Birds stated that the recipe had not been altered.
