= Queen Elizabeth's Academy =

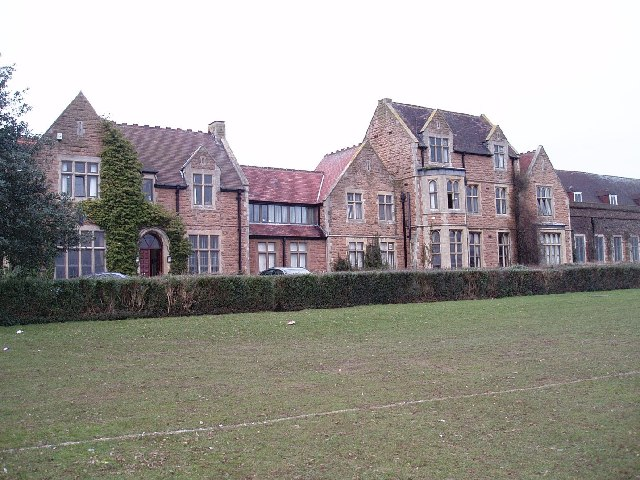
- The old School House with assembly hall to far right and main playing field to front

Location
- Chesterfield Road South; Mansfield; Nottinghamshire, NG19 7AP; England

Information
- Type: Academy
- Motto: Semper eadem (Always the same)
- Religious affiliation: Church of England
- Established: 1561
- Local authority: Nottinghamshire
- Trust: Diverse Academies Trust
- Department for Education URN: 144486 Tables
- Ofsted: Reports
- Principal: Donna Percival
- Gender: Co-educational
- Age: 11 to 18
- Enrollment: 603 (April 2021)
- Website: www.queenelizabeths-ac.org.uk

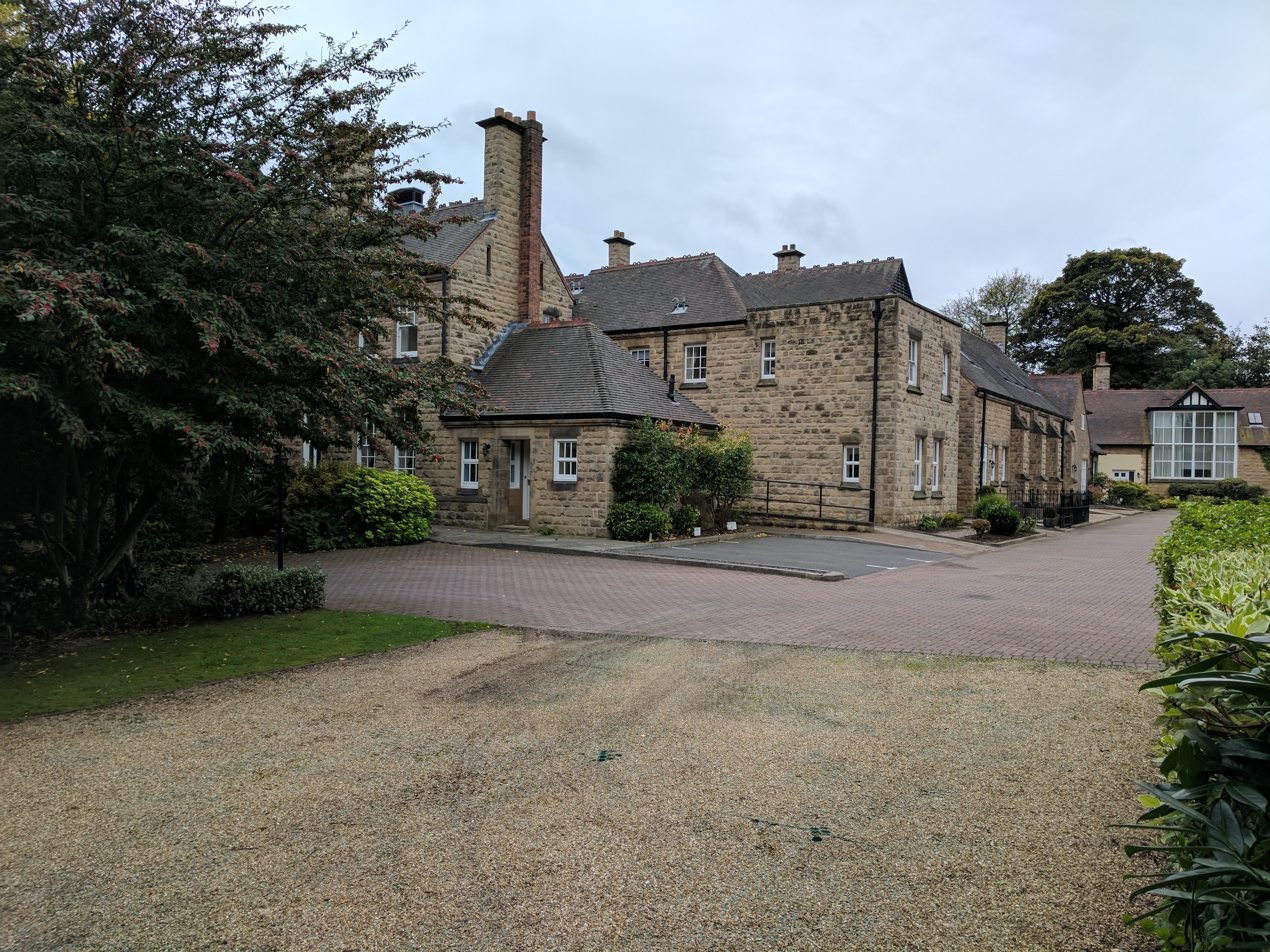
The old Girls' School main building is Grade II listed, together with the boundary wall and gate pillars. The building was converted into residential apartments, with planning consent granted in 1997 for 25 four-and-five bedroomed new-build houses within the grounds.

Queen Elizabeth's Academy (formerly The Queen Elizabeth's (1561) Endowed School) is a co-educational Church of England secondary school and sixth form located in Mansfield in the English county of Nottinghamshire.

== History ==
The school was first established in 1561 during the reign of Queen Elizabeth I, after whom the school is named. Celebrations to mark the 450th anniversary in July 2011 included a gala day and garden party.

A sports pavilion was erected on the main playing field, chiefly funded by old boys to honour those from the school who had died in the first war. It was opened in 1928 by Field Marshal Viscount Allenby.

=== Grammar school ===
For many years it was known as Queen Elizabeth's Grammar School (QEGS) for Boys, after the Queen had issued Letters Patent authorising a Free Grammar School in Mansfield. Originally situated in buildings at Church Side, close to St Peter's Church in Mansfield town centre, construction of the present buildings started in 1875 with the school taking residence in 1878. In 1993, the school merged with the former Queen Elizabeth's Grammar School for Girls.

=== Girls' School ===
From 1875, school trustees were allowed to contribute £1,000 annually to the provision of girls' education. A temporary facility was established in a semi-detached house on Woodhouse Road, Mansfield, during 1884, opening in January, 1885 with 35 pupils. Expansion necessitated purchase of the house next door until new school buildings were established nearby, to open on 22 September 1891 with 143 pupils. The girls' school operated independently until August 1993, after which it was amalgamated into the boys' school premises.

=== Comprehensive ===
In more modern times it was a voluntary aided school administered by Nottinghamshire County Council.

In 2011 the school was placed into special measures after a critical Ofsted report deriving from a March audit was published in May. In January 2012 The Queen Elizabeth's Endowed School converted to academy status and was renamed Queen Elizabeth's Academy.

In September 2016 the school became part of the Diverse Academies Learning Partnership trust (DALP) following an "inadequate" finding from a January 2016 Ofsted report, including "leadership and management" – the third time in four years that the worst rating had been issued. It continues to be a Church of England school under the jurisdiction of the Diocese of Southwell and Nottingham.

== Subjects ==
Queen Elizabeth's Academy offers GCSEs and BTECs as programmes of study for pupils, while students in the sixth form have the option to study from a range of A Levels, Cambridge Technicals and further BTECs.

Sixth form education at Queen Elizabeth's Academy is offered as part of the Hucknall Sixth Form Centre, a consortium of three schools within the Diverse Academies Trust based at a dedicated site in Hucknall.

== Notable former pupils ==
=== Queen Elizabeth's Grammar School for Boys ===
- James Barnes (cricketer)
- Jack Butterworth, Baron Butterworth, first vice-chancellor from 1965 to 1985 of the University of Warwick
- Darrell Clarke, former professional football player and football manager, most recently of Port Vale F.C.
- Samuel Jebb
- David Pye (zoologist), Professor of Zoology from 1973 to 1991 at Queen Mary and Westfield College
- Mike Woodcock, Conservative MP from 1983 to 1992 for Ellesmere Port and Neston

== See also ==
- Listed buildings in Mansfield (outer areas)
