= St Guthlac's Church, Branston =

Church in Branston, Leicestershire

Coordinates: 52°51′26″N 0°47′56″W

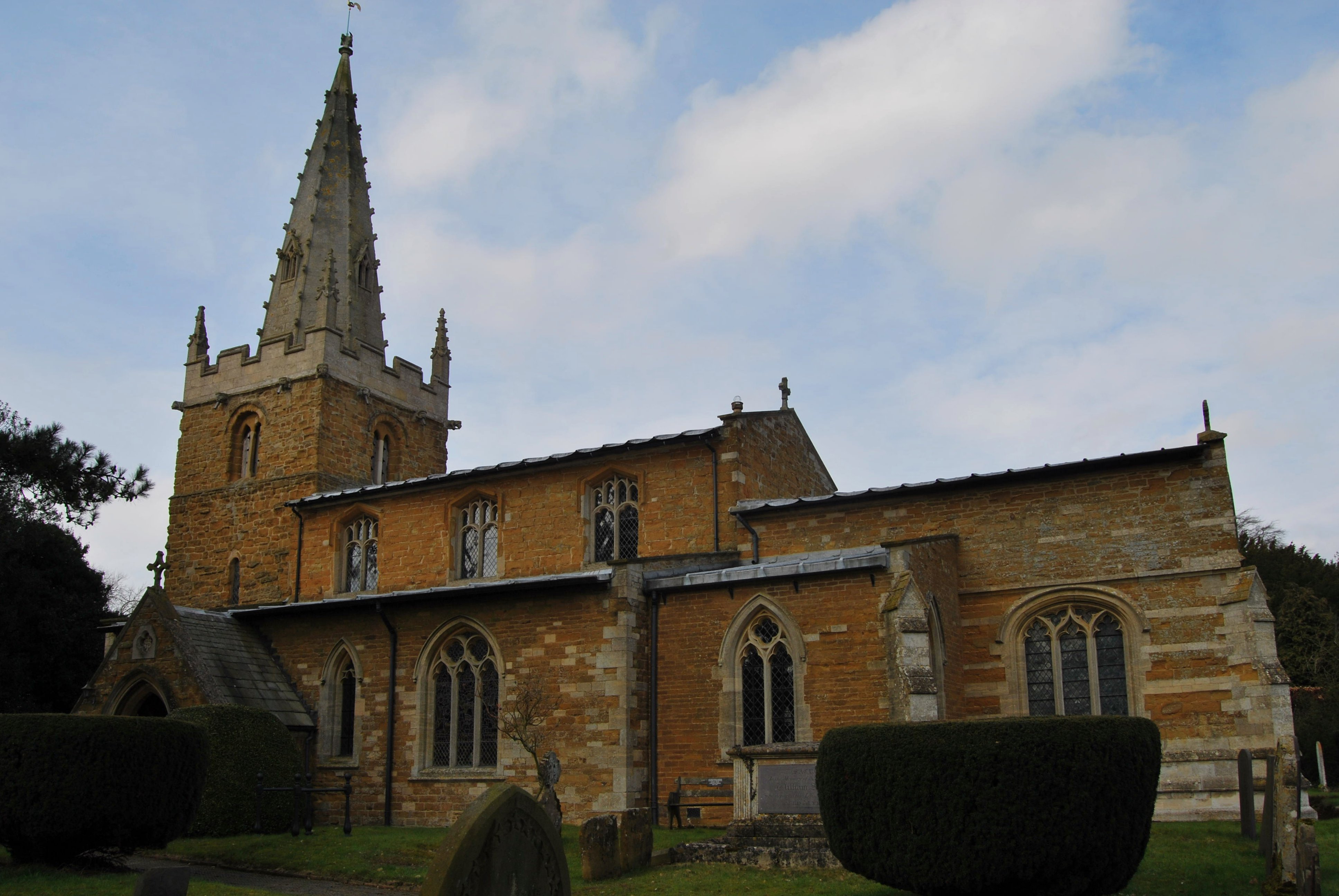
- Denomination: Church of England

History
- Dedication: St Guthlac

Administration
- Diocese: Leicester
- Archdeaconry: Leicester
- Parish: Branston, Leicestershire

Clergy
- Rector: David Cowie

St Guthlac's Church (Note: Some sources suggest that the dedication is to St Cuthbert) is a church in Branston, Leicestershire. It is a Grade II* listed building.

== History ==
The church dates from the 13th century but has 15th century additions. The nave roofs and the chancel were added in 1895-96 by Thomas Garner and George Frederick Bodley.

The church has a rare Hugh Russell organ dating from the 18th century. There is a Norman font and arches. The north aisle has a slab to John Spethyn dating from 1460.
