= Charles Lloyd (organ builder) =

English pipe organ builder (1835–1908)

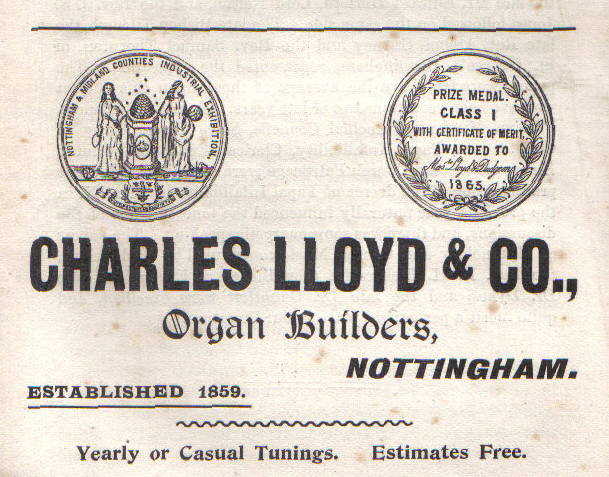
Advertisement from the Illustrated Guide to the Church Congress 1897

Charles Lloyd (8 September 1835 – 8 October 1908) was a pipe organ builder based in Nottingham who flourished between 1859 and 1908.

== Family ==
He was born in London on 8 September 1835, the son of shoemaker Samuel Lloyd. He was baptised on 18 March 1838 in St Pancras New Church. In 1851, at age 15, he was an apprentice organ builder.

He married Mary Ann Dennison (b c. 1841 in Nottingham) in 1864.

== Background ==
Charles Lloyd had previously worked for Samuel Groves of London. Lloyd set up in business first with Lorenzo Valentine and shortly afterwards with Alfred Dudgeon. Their workshop was at 52A Union Road, near the centre of Nottingham. The company Valentine and Dudgeon was started in 1859. They were soon at work installing organs in places of worship in and around the Nottingham area. Lloyd was commissioned by Sydney Pierrepont, 3rd Earl Manvers of Holme Pierrepont, to construct and exhibit a two manual and pedal organ at the Birmingham Trades Exhibition in 1865. It won Lloyd a gold medal award for its workmanship and tone. After the exhibition, the organ was moved back to Nottingham and installed in St. Edmund's Church, Holme Pierrepont.

== Charles Lloyd & Co. ==
Lloyd & Dudgeon were partners until the death of Albert Dudgeon on 6 February 1874. The company name was then changed to Charles Lloyd & Co., Church Organ Builders, Nottingham.

When the Great Central Railway was brought to Nottingham in 1896, land occupied by the Lloyd business had to be cleared to make way for the Victoria Station. Lloyd moved to 79 Brighton Street, St Ann's.

In 1909, his son, Charles Frederick Lloyd took over the business and it continued until 1928 with no change to the name. The company was then acquired by Roger Yates.

=== Company names and addresses ===
- Lloyd and Valentine 1859 – 1860, Bilbie Street, Nottingham
- Lloyd and Valentine 1861, 19 William Street, and 6 Sherwood Street, Nottingham
- Lloyd and Dudgeon 1862 – 1876, 52A Union Road, Nottingham
- Charles Lloyd & Co. 1876 – 1896, 52A Union Road, Nottingham
- Charles Lloyd & Co. 1896 – 1928, 79 Brighton Street, St Ann's, Nottingham

== Apprentices ==
His first apprentice was Ernest Wragg of Carlton who, after his period of training, set up as an organ builder himself in 1894 on Carlton Road, Thorneywood, as E. Wragg & Son, Organ Builders.

The second was John Compton, born in Measham, Leicestershire. He entered into organ building first at Birmingham, then with Brindley of Sheffield, then in Nottingham under Charles Lloyd. When free of his apprenticeship in 1902, along with an organ builder named Musson of Woodborough Road, Nottingham, they became Compton & Musson.

== Noted instruments ==
- Union Workhouse, Melton Mowbray, Leicestershire 1859
- Scalford Church 1859
- Melton Mowbray Wesleyan Church 1859
- St George's Church, Leicester 1860 additions
- All Saints Church, Loughborough 1862 additions
- Holy Trinity Church, Bulcote, Nottinghamshire 1862
- St Ann's Church, St Ann's Well Road, Nottingham 1864
- St John the Baptist's Church, Leenside, Nottingham 1865
- All Saints' Church, Nottingham 1865
- St. Paul's Church, Hyson Green, Nottingham 1865
- St. Edmund's Church, Holme Pierrepont 1865
- St Mary's Church, Evedon, Lincolnshire 1866
- St Mary's Church, Cromford, Derbyshire ca. 1868 additions
- Broad Street Baptist Church, Nottingham 1869
- All Saints' Church, Mackworth, Derbyshire 1870
- St. Andrew's Church, Nottingham from St Mary's Church, Nottingham 1871
- St John's Church, Codnor 1876 enlargement
- All Saints' Church, Findern, Derbyshire 1876
- St James' Church, Swarkestone, Derbyshire ca. 1876
- Thoresby Church 1876
- St Helen's Church, Burton Joyce, 1879
- Congregational Church, Middleton-by-Wirksworth, Derbyshire, ca 1880
- Holy Trinity Church, Middleton-by-Wirksworth, Derbyshire, ca 1880
- Shaw Lane Methodist Church, Milford, Derbyshire, ca 1880
- St. Thomas' Church, Nottingham 1882
- Chellaston Methodist Church, High Street, Chellaston, Derbyshire 1882
- Riddings Congregational Church, Alfreton, Derbyshire 1883
- St James' Church, Riddings 1885 (enlargement)
- Addison Street Congregational Church, Nottingham 1885
- Holloway Methodist Church, Church Street, Holloway, Derbyshire ca. 1885
- St Luke's Church, Hickling (restoration) 1886
- St. Bartholomew's Church, Nottingham 1887
- St Barnabas' Church, Derby, 1889
- St Lawrence's Church, North Wingfield, Derbyshire, 1890
- St Mary and St Barlock's Church, Norbury, Derbyshire 1890
- St. Sebastian's Church, Great Gonerby, Lincolnshire, 1890
- St Michael's Church, Hoveringham 1891
- Wood Street Primitive Methodist Church, Ripley, Derbyshire, 1892
- Somercotes Church, Alfreton, Derbyshire 1894
- St Bartholomew's Church, Clay Cross, Derbyshire 1894
- St. Andrew's Church, Barrow Hill, Derbyshire 1895
- Draycott Methodist Church, Market Street, Draycott, Derbyshire ca. 1897
- St. Giles Church, West Bridgford, Nottingham 1899 at a cost of £500. It was a three manual and pedal with choir organ prepared for. It was rebuilt and enlarged by Henry Willis & Sons in 1952, and removed in 1993.
- Ebenezer Methodist Church, Newhall, Derbyshire ca. 1900 (in 2008 installed in Swadlincote Baptist Church)
- Christ Church, St Albans, Hertfordshire, ca. 1900 rebuilt and enlarged
- Methodist Church, Bingham Road, Cotgrave, Nottinghamshire 1900
- Free Church, Upper Broughton, Nottinghamshire ca. 1900
- St John the Evangelist's Church, Hazelwood, Derbyshire 1902
- All Saints' Church, Kirk Hallam Derbyshire 1904
- St. Michael and All Angels, Alvaston, Derbyshire 1904
- Albion Congregational Church, Sneinton, Nottingham 1905
- Carlton Methodist Church, Nottingham 1905
- St Thomas' Church, Brampton, Derbyshire 1906
- St. John's Church, Ripley, Derbyshire 1906 (now in St. Mary the Virgin, Stoke Bruerne, Northamptonshire)
- St John's Church, Newhall, Derbyshire 1909
- St. Mary's Church, Greasley, Nottinghamshire 1910
