= Samuel Groves =

British organ builder (c.1817–1858)

Samuel Groves (c. 1817 – 20 October 1858) was a British organ builder based in London.

== Family ==
He was born in Cerne Abbas, Dorset

He married Elizabeth (c. 1807 – 21 March 1853)

He married Emma Barrows Lockington in 1854.

== Career ==
He was apprenticed to Gray and Davison for 10 years, and then set up his own business around 1849 with John Mitchell. They had works at 8 Great Marlborough Street, London, and 7 St Ann's Street, Manchester.

His partnership with John Mitchell ended in 1851. Shortly afterwards his factory on Little Marlborough Street was destroyed by fire. The last business premises was 38 Euston Road, London.

He applied for several patents, including improvements in pneumatic apparatus for pumping or forcing air. and improvements in organs.

He died on 20 October 1858 at the Raven Hotel, St Helen's in the county of Lancaster. On his death, the organ being installed at Vicar Lane Chapel in Coventry was completed by two of his apprentices, Charles Lloyd and Lorenzo Valentine, who later established an organ building partnership of their own.

== Organs built ==
- St Paul's Church, Cambridge
- Penrhyn Parish Church, 1846
- Parliament Street Methodist Church, Nottingham 1851
- Town Hall, St Helen's, Lancashire
- Providence Congregational Church, High Street, Rochdale
- St Mary Woolnoth 1851 Repairs and alterations
- Southwell Minster 1854 Overhaul
- St Stephen's (Huntingdonians) Chapel, Rochdale and Middleton 1854
- Nottingham Mechanics' Institution 1854 repairs and enlargement
- Baptist Church, Aldeburgh, Suffolk
- St Chad's Church, Rochdale 1855
- Congregational Chapel, Mossley, Greater Manchester 1855
- Bethel Chapel, Bury, Greater Manchester 1855
- Dartford Church 1856
- Great Meeting Chapel, Leicester 1856
- Thornton Church, Yorkshire 1856
- St. Mary's Church, Radcliffe on Trent, Nottinghamshire 1856
- Mr George Simpson's Musical Academy, High Street, Hanley, Staffordshire 1856
- St Mary's Church, Attenborough 1857
- St. Mark's Church, Nottingham 1857
- St George's Church, Leicester 1857 rebuild
- Chirbury Church, Shropshire 1857
- Vicar Lane Congregational Chapel, Coventry 1858 Finished by his apprentices Charles Lloyd and Lorenzo Valentine
