= C. F. Lloyd =

British organ builder

Charles Frederick Lloyd (11 June 1867 – 31 July 1925) was a British pipe organ builder in Nottingham, England.

== Biography ==
Charles Frederick Lloyd was born in Nottingham, the only surviving son of Charles Lloyd, who had established an organ building business in the city, and Mary Ann Jennison. At age 18, he married Louisa Oaksford, and had two sons, Charles Henry and Frederick Arthur.

Charles Frederick Lloyd took over the business, Charles Lloyd & Co., after the death of his father in 1908. Lloyd & Co. continued until his death in 1925, when he left the business to his son Frederick. In 1928, the business was bought by Roger Yates.

Lloyd was also the organist of St. Ann's Church, Nottingham for more than 40 years, until poor health caused him to step down 18 months prior to his death.

== Company names and addresses ==
- Lloyd and Valentine 1859–1860, Bilbie Street, Nottingham
- Lloyd and Dudgeon 1862–1876, 52A Union Road, Nottingham
- C. Lloyd & Co 1876–1896, 52A Union Road, Nottingham
- C. Lloyd & Co 1896–1928, 79 Brighton Street, St Ann's, Nottingham
