= Thomas Adams (manufacturer and philanthropist) =

British lace manufacturer and philanthropist (1807–1873)

- Born: 5 February 1807; Worksop, Nottinghamshire, United Kingdom
- Died: 16 May 1873 (aged 66)

Thomas Adams (5 February 1807 – 16 May 1873) was a British lace manufacturer and philanthropist based in Nottingham.

== Early years ==
Thomas Adams was born at Worksop, Nottinghamshire, on 5 February 1807. His father (also named Thomas) was a maltster, a trade in the doldrums at that time. Not long after Thomas' birth, the family moved to Ware, Hertfordshire (his father's birthplace), to try to improve their situation. Thomas Senior died shortly afterwards, and his wife took the family up to the Sheffield area, where her family originated from.

In 1821, aged 14, Thomas was sent to Newark-on-Trent, Nottinghamshire to become apprentice to a draper in the town. After serving his full seven years, he moved to London. During this time he was tricked into going over to Paris, and was robbed and abandoned there. Through the help of an English lace merchant, he was able to make his return journey. Reflecting on his stupidity in later years, Adams felt that the incident had influenced his life from then on. Safely back in London, he had a brief time in the warehouse of Messrs Boden, a Derby lace company, before moving to Nottingham.

== Business beginnings ==
Thomas arrived in Nottingham in late 1829, opening business from a small house at 9 Stoney Street. On 2 September 1830, he married Lucy Cullen, daughter of a Nottingham businessman, in St Mary's Church, just a stone's throw away. He seems to have formed business partnerships, buying made lace goods and selling them on to wholesale and retail customers. In the mid-1830s, he was shown in local business directories as a lace manufacturer. Within 4 years, the business moved the short distance to 14/15 St Mary's Gate where, with successive partners, he was to remain for the next 20 years.

== Philanthropist, Christian and family man ==
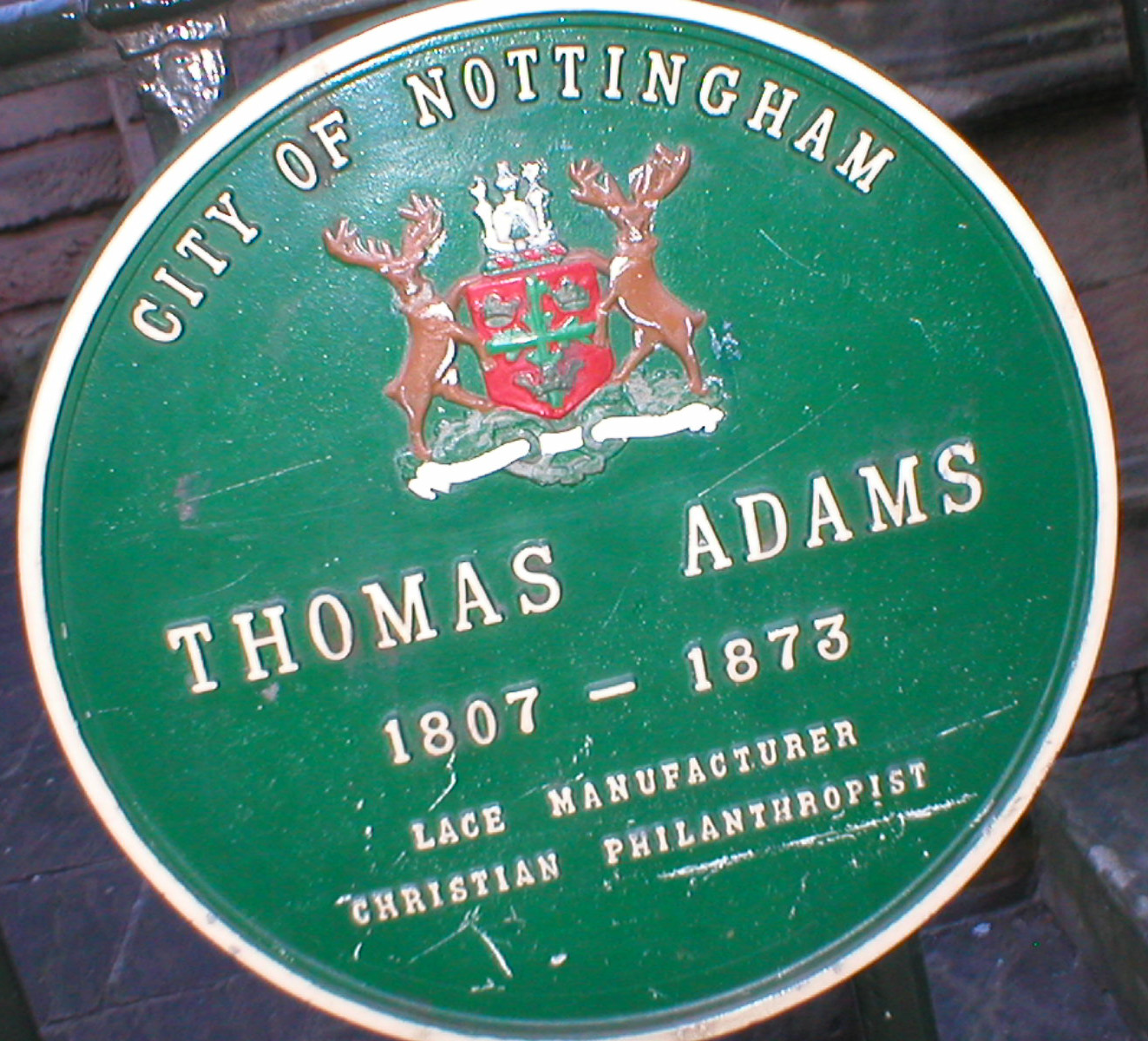
City of Nottingham Green plaque honouring Adams' achievements

Adams had some reverses in trading, the scope of his business being reduced in 1843 and 1844 through a financial crisis brought about by the failure of an agent. In 1857 there was a fluctuation in the lace trade prompted by panic in America, and the American Civil War caused a worldwide shortage of cotton for much of the 1860s.

He was a hard and sharp businessman, strictly honest but often capable of striking a good bargain. Away from commerce, he was extremely generous, giving away large sums of money to charity, in particular, to religious and educational projects. For example, in 1846, he anonymously gave £500 to the Bishop of Lincoln towards the building of a school for the poor. Later, after the Elementary Education Act 1807, he gave £500 and a further £400 towards the site for a new school in nearby Poplar Street.

He was one of a band of Christian philanthropists who succeeded in building 6 churches in Nottingham. One of these, St Luke's Church, Nottingham was of particular interest to Adams as many of its parishioners were Adams Company employees. He laid its foundation stone on 2 July 1862.

After his death, the family bought land and provided several hundred pounds to build St Philip's Church, Pennyfoot Street, intended to be the Thomas Adams memorial church. St Mary's, where Thomas and Lucy married, has a large stained-glass memorial window at its West end. There is also a memorial to Thomas in St Leodegarius Church, Basford.

== Expansion – the Adams and Page warehouse ==
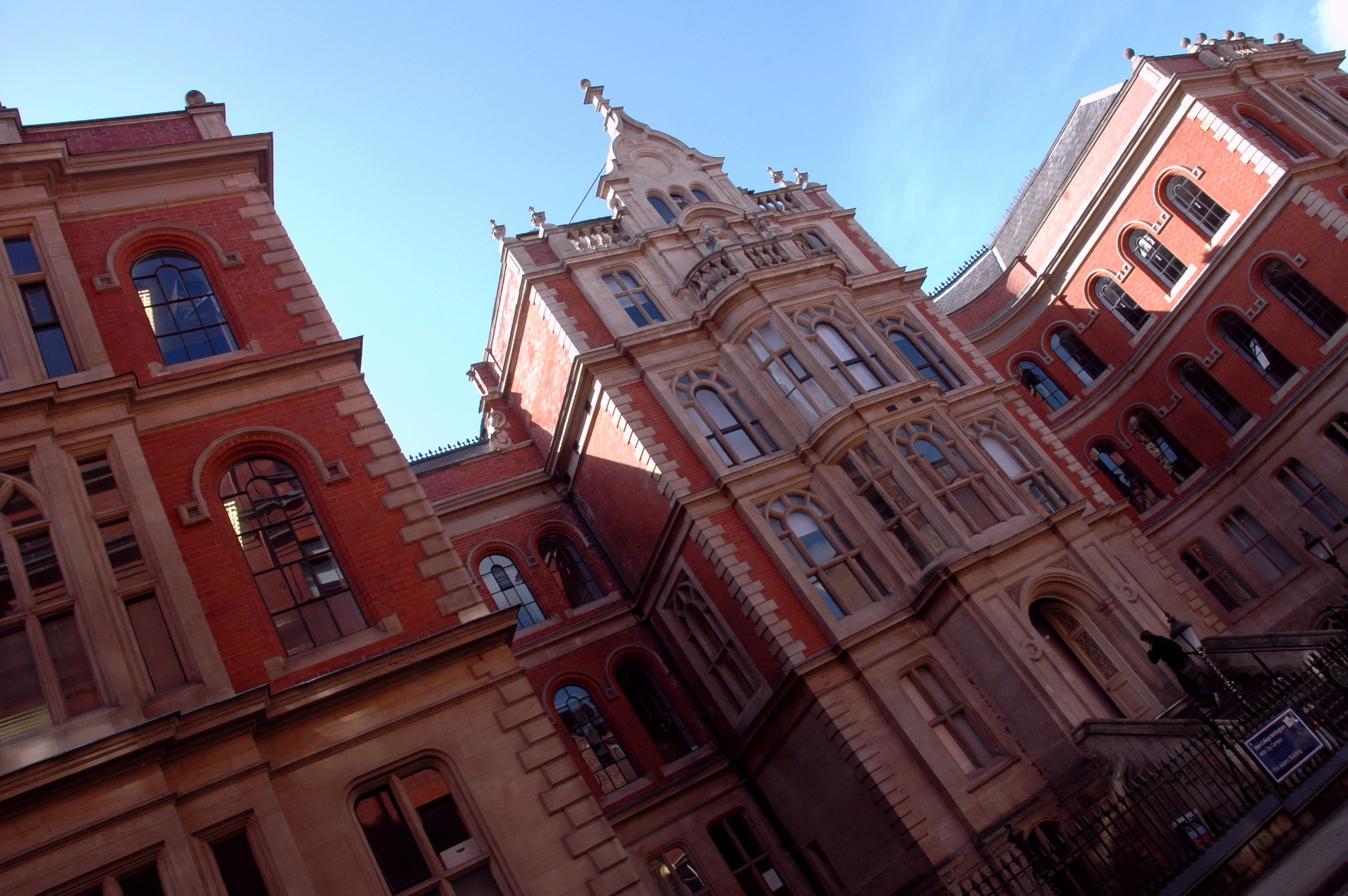
Principal facade, Adams and Page warehouse, Stoney Street, Nottingham

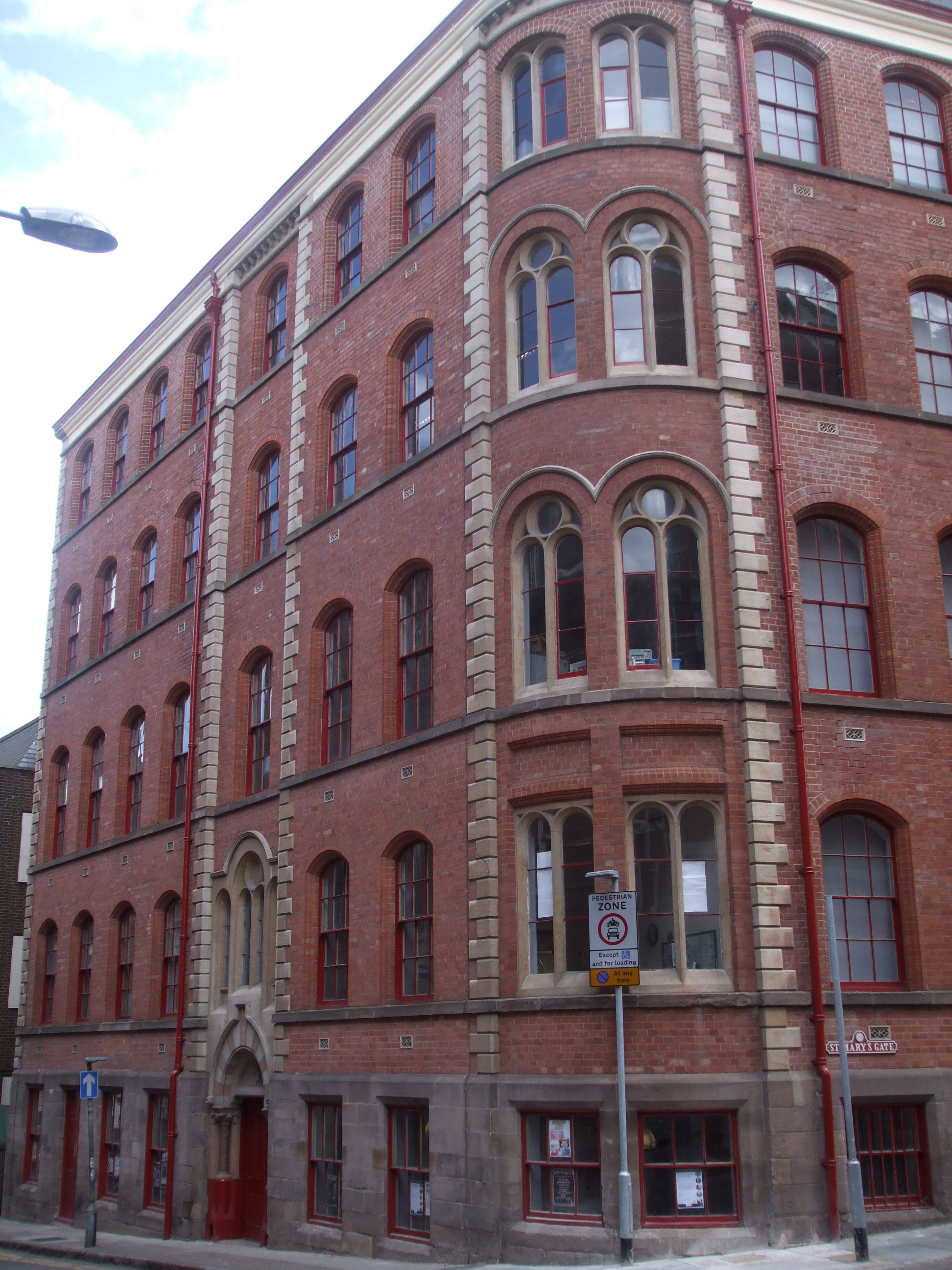
Phase 2, Warser Gate frontage

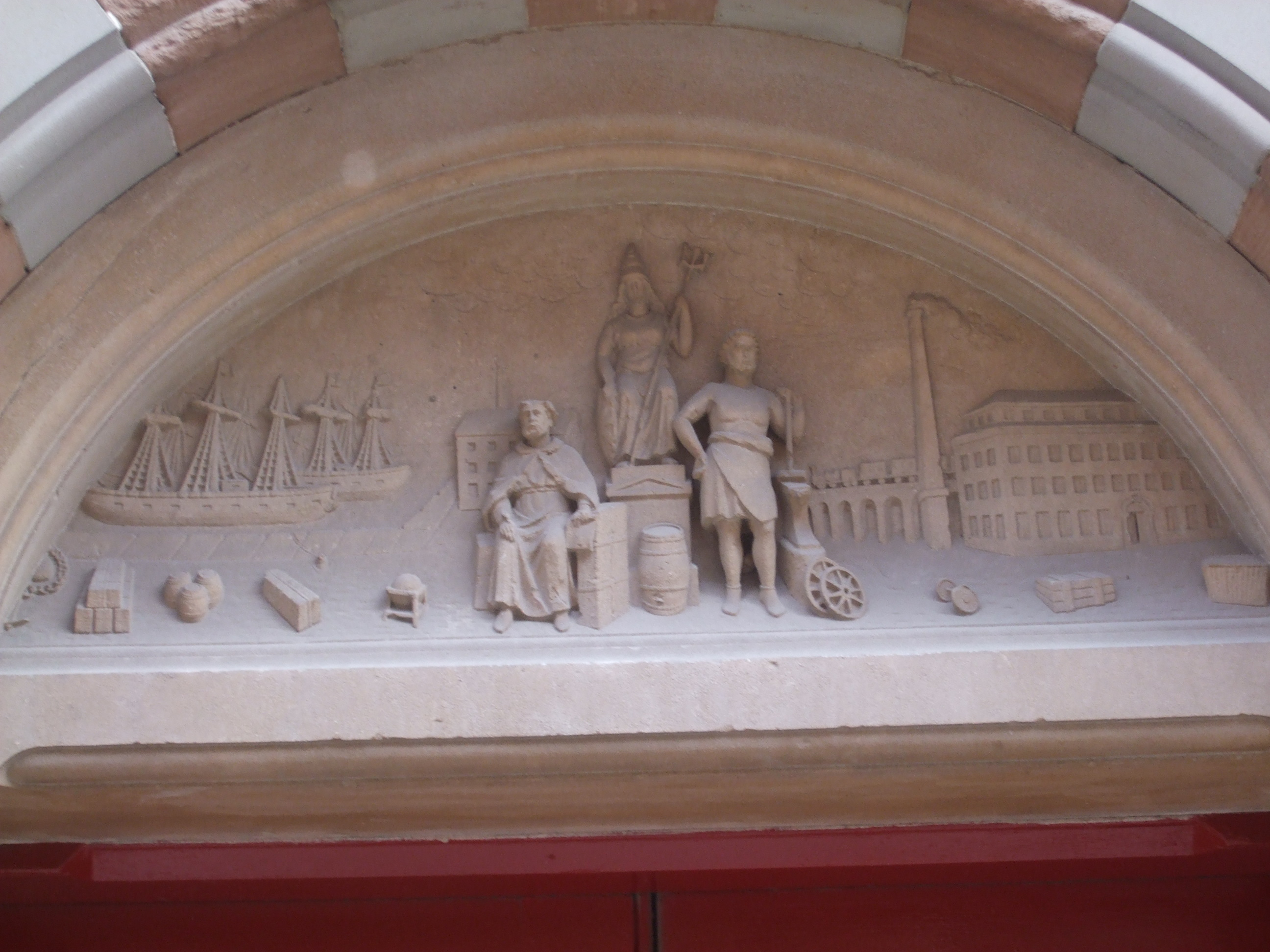
Detailing, Warser Gate facade

== Employee facilities ==
The evangelical proprietor wrote a short tract, a copy of which was given to every employee before the move into the new warehouse; outlining not only the provision for their physical well-being, but also for their spiritual side:

We desire to regard you as our fellow Christians, and to do all that lies in our power to advance the interest of you as well as your bodily welfare. For this object we have set apart a room in the new warehouse, in which we invite you to meet us every morning in social worship, so that we may seek the blessing of God upon our daily labours.

Hine, in fact, designed a special chapel located in the basement (designated as Floor B in the ncn Adams Building). This was provided with "comfortable benches and kneeling" and had stained glass windows facing onto the main Stoney Street facade. Records show that some 400 out of a predominantly female workforce of around 600 attended chapel from 8.00 to 8.30 am, in paid work time. Thomas Adams was always present, having left home promptly at 7.45. Often he would walk in from his home at Lenton Firs, Derby Road. A chaplain was appointed on an annual salary of £200 to conduct the morning service. Later, the tradition of a New Year service in the chapel was established, with (as late as the 1930s) the Bishop of Southwell or Sheffield providing the address.

For the staff's physical well-being, a separate building contained an employees' dining room, men's tea room and segregated washing facilities for both sexes. Other benefits included 'Improvement Classes', Children's Classes, a 'Penny Bank', Medical Aid Society and Library.

== Further business expansion ==
The opening of the Stoney Street warehouse was inevitably the high point in Adams' career. Between 1857 and 1860, Thomas Adams & Company flourished;this in spite of recessions in the lace trade during which time nearly 60 lace firms went bankrupt.

The warehouse was greatly enlarged in the mid-1860s; probably on the strength of its flotation as a limited company. A bleaching, dyeing and lace-dressing factory at Sherwood Hill in New Basford; was built to TC Hine's designs.

=== Nottingham Joint Stock Bank ===
The end of the American Civil War had brought about a general improvement in the cotton-based textile trades, and there was a need for fresh capital to expand the lace industry.

With the support of businessmen from Nottingham (including Adams) and Birmingham, the Joint Stock Bank was formed with a capital of £1 million and offices at 60 Bridlesmith Gate. The Bank flourished, and, not surprisingly, Thomas Adams & Company became one of its first clients.

Adams became a Director of the Bank, and by 1873, chairman. On 31 January 1873, he laid the foundation stone of the new Head Office on Victoria Street (now the Victoria Club).

== Civic connections ==
Outside of business interests, Thomas took on a range of civic responsibilities. A Tory, he was first elected as a Councillor for St Mary's Ward in 1846 and continued to represent the ward for the next 28 years. On several occasions, he was offered the position of Mayor, itself an accolade in Whig-dominated Nottingham, but declined the honour.

in November 1856, Adams and Richard Birkin were both appointed as Borough Magistrates. Thomas served in the role for 15 years, also becoming a magistrate for the county of Nottinghamshire also.

May 1861 saw Adams appointed as a Charitable Trustee for the Borough. He was also a member of the Lenton School Board and Radford Board of Guardians. Even in his last year, Thomas was serving on several Borough committees, namely: the Bridge Estate, Parliamentary and Free Public Libraries and Museums.

== Later years ==
The death of his eldest son, Samuel, in 1870 was a major blow, and signalled a steady decline in Thomas' health. This was also a setback for future company plans as Thomas had assumed that sons Samuel and John would at some stage take over from him.

Thomas was suffering from jaundice, and in 1871, sought specialist care and treatment in Germany. His condition, however, gradually worsened and he died at Lenton Firs, for so long the family home, on 16 May 1873. It was reported that more than 10,000 people attended his funeral, held at "The Valley of the Rocks", in the Church Cemetery on Mansfield Road.

The stretch of Derby Road, which nowadays climbs along the edge of the University of Nottingham Highfields campus, close to Lenton Firs is named Adams Hill to this day.

== Thomas Adams' legacy ==
Looking back at his concern for his workforce, it is interesting to pick up the provisions he made for their welfare when the company was incorporated in 1865.

The company would help in "the establishing, managing and assisting of churches, chapels, schools, libraries, banks, dispensaries, infirmaries, provident societies, clubs and other institutions for the benefit of persons employed by the Company and their families and others."

This passed a man who said "I can make money but I cannot make a speech." He certainly "made money", but for 25 years there was not a church or school built in Nottingham to which he did not contribute. Whilst he gave small subscriptions publicly, his large gifts were anonymous and only revealed after his death. When probate was granted in July 1873, his estate was put at £90,000 (equivalent to £8,460,700 in 2025).
