= Broadgate House =

House in Beeston, Nottinghamshire, England

Coordinates: 52°55′54.6″N 1°12′25.2″W

Broadgate House, Beeston
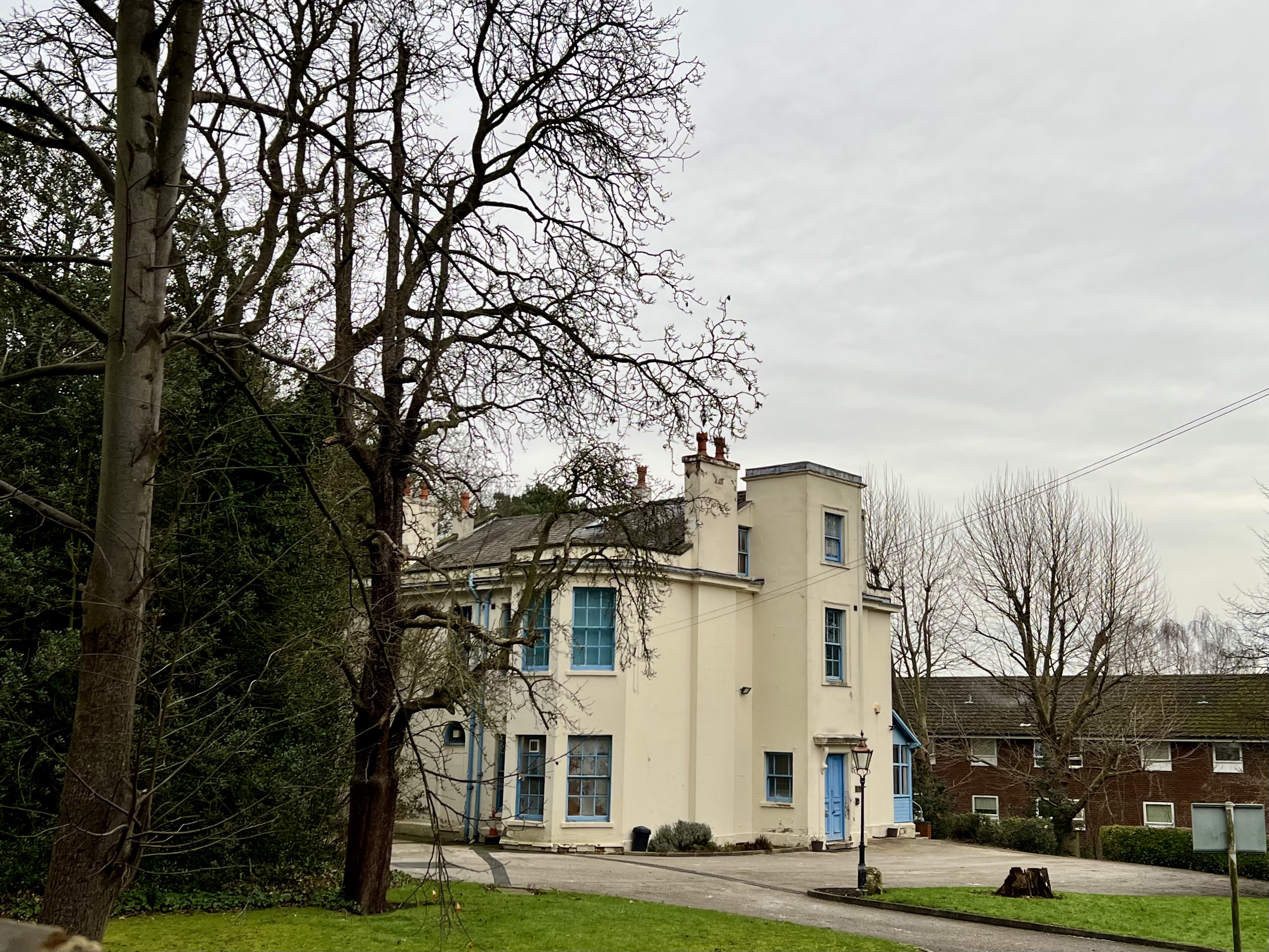
- Broadgate House

- Location within Nottinghamshire

General information
- Location: 72 Broadgate, Beeston, Nottingham
- Estimated completion: 1849

Design and construction
- Designations: Grade II listed

Broadgate House is a building in Beeston, Nottingham.

== History ==
The house was built in the 1840s probably for Edward Joseph Lowe who moved to live there shortly after his marriage on 2 January 1849.

=== The Beeston Observatory ===
Lowe was a noted meteorologist and astronomer and had already installed some meteorological instruments and also his own 11 feet (3.4 m) refracting telescope, and he modified the building to include a rotating cupola roof. Following an unsuccessful campaign to build a public observatory in the Midlands in the early 1850s to house the collection of astronomical telescopes of Henry Lawson Lawson persuaded Lowe to accept the instruments for an observatory at his home opened as an observatory 1855, and had a rotating cupola roof.

The Beeston Observatory was mainly for meteorological observations. As well as the usual meteorological instruments it included an Earthquake Pendulum, which ascended 33 feet (10 m) to the top of the building. The pendulum rod was of deal wood and terminated in a loaded bulb of brass and lead of 2 pounds (0.91 kg) in weight with a steel point which acted upon a smooth surface of hard baked chalk. When the top of the building was distributed by the shock of an earthquake, the steel point would inscribe a result in the chalk. At the top of the house, he installed Electrometers with lighting wires conducted from trees around the building. These were fed to two gilded balls and cylinders for determining the negative and positive character of the electricity and the relative amount.

=== Later use ===
At some point the house was transferred to his sister Marianne Agnes Lowe (1817-1884), who lived there until her death when the house was put up for sale.

The house was lived in by Stephen Armitage until his death in 1915.

Later in life the building was used by the East Midlands Universities Air Squadron.

== See also ==
- Listed buildings in Beeston, Nottinghamshire
