= Henry Houseley =

English organist, composer and teacher

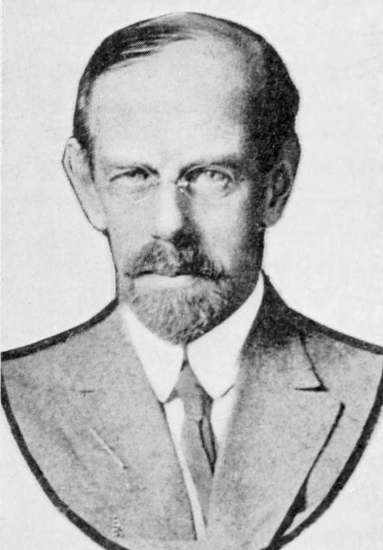
- Born: 20 September 1851; Sutton-in-Ashfield, Nottinghamshire, England
- Died: 13 March 1925 (aged 73); Denver, Colorado, US
- Occupations: Organist, composer, teacher

Henry Houseley FRCO (20 September 1851 – 13 March 1925) was an English organist, composer and teacher, who moved to Denver, Colorado.

== Career ==
Henry Houseley was born on 20 September 1851 in Sutton in Ashfield, Nottinghamshire. He received his musical education in Nottingham and London from James Turpin, and Edmund Hart Turpin. In London Henry Houseley studied at the Royal College of Organists, earning an FRCO. He served as organist at St. Luke's Church, Derby, England; St. Thomas' Church, Nottingham. Furthermore, he was also organist to the Nottingham Harmonic Society and music lecturer at the college in Nottingham. Being in England, he wrote most of his piano and organ music.

He moved to Denver, Colorado in 1888. From 1888 to at least 1901 he lived there. In 1892, he succeeded John Gower as organist of St. John's Episcopal Cathedral. He was also organist of the Temple Emmanuel church in Denver for 30 years. Outside of church commitments, he was for 25 years music director at the Rocky Mountain and Colorado Ancient and Accepted Scottish Rite of Freemasons, director of the Denver Symphony Orchestra, and director of the Denver Choral Society, which won a $1,000 prize in a Denver competition in 1896, and first prize at the St. Louis World's Fair in 1904. Houseley also directed a men's chorus called the Apollo Club, played the organ at the Oakes Home (an old age home run by the Episcopal Diocese of Colorado), was on the faculties of the Denver Conservatory of Music and the University of Colorado, and was on the board of the Musical Society of Denver.

He was a Founder of the American Guild of Organists. Living in Colorado, He was a prolific composer: he wrote anthems, pieces for mixed chorus, arrangements for women's voices, men's voices, songs, piano works, organ pieces, and six operas, including Native Silver and Juggler. Houseley started writing operas when he had moved to Colorado. He died on 13 March 1925 in Denver, Colorado and his ashes were interred in the east wall of the choir at St. John's Episcopal Cathedral.

== Appointments ==
- Organist at St. Matthew's Church, Nottingham ????–1870
- Organist at St. Luke's Church, Derby 1870–1882
- Organist at St. Thomas' Church, Nottingham 1882–1888
- Assistant Organist of St. John's Episcopal Cathedral, Denver 1888–1892
- Organist of St. John's Episcopal Cathedral, Denver 1892–1925
- Organist of the Temple Emmanuel church in Denver 1895?–1925?

== Compositions ==
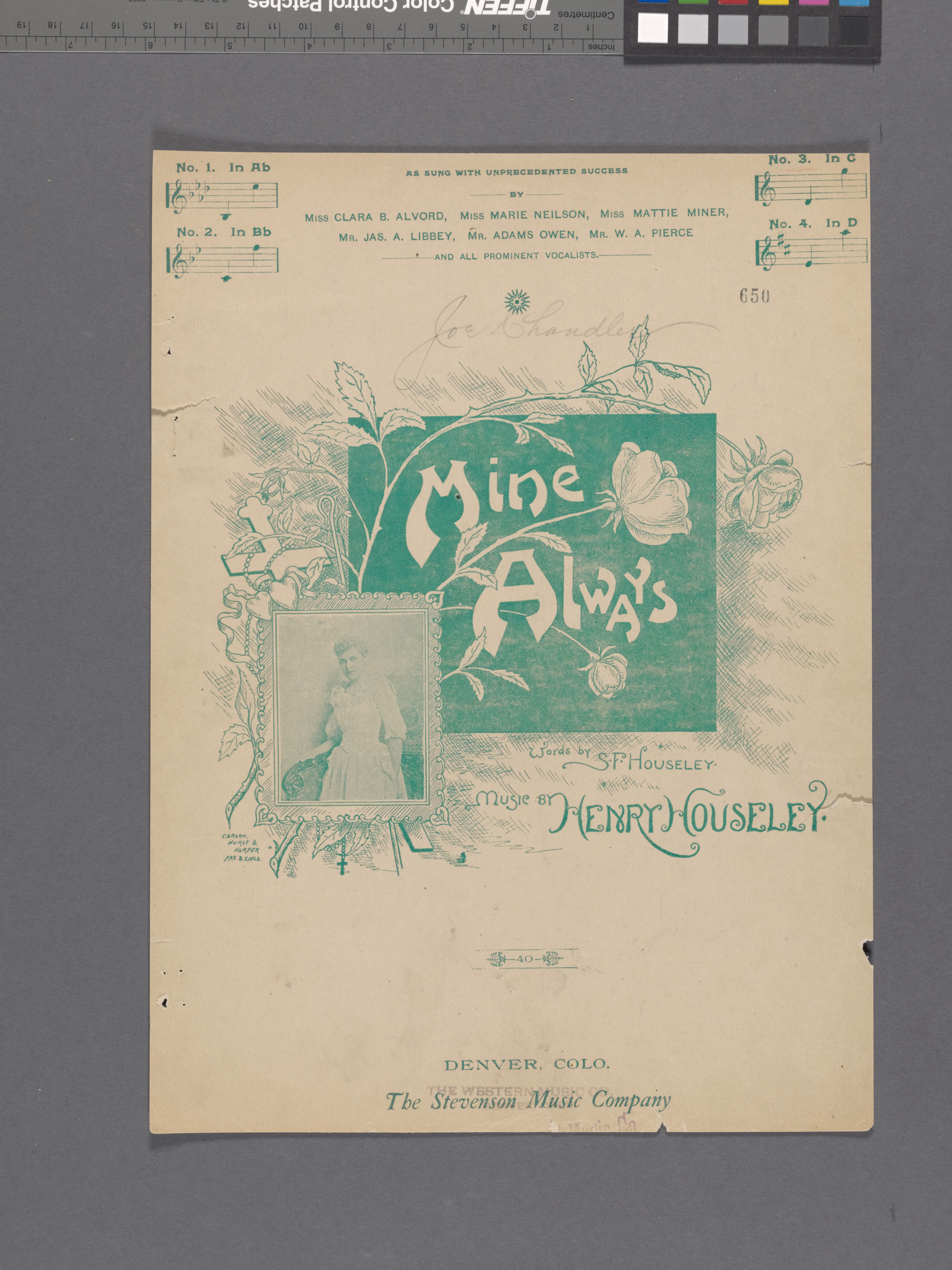
Cover of Mine always

He wrote anthems, works for mixed chorus, songs, piano and organ pieces, and six operas.

=== Secular works ===
- The Best of all good company. Song (1875)
- I listened one autumn evening. Cavatina (1879)
- Pretty Primrose (1891)
- Mine Always (1892)
- Wait, Mister Postman! A Song sung often when once sung (1894)
- Only a broken heart, (1894), music Henry Houseley, text Sidney Francis
- King Death, for men's choir, music Henry Houseley (1900), text by Barry Cornwall (1787-1874)
- The Abyssinian patrol: march (1902 and 1905)

=== Operas ===
- Native Silver (1891)
- The Juggler (1895)
- Love and whist. Operetta in one act (1898)
- Narcissus and Echo (1912)
- Omar Khayyam: A Dramatic Cantata, for Soli, Chorus, and Orchestra (1917)

=== Sacred works ===
- The Last Tryst. Begin: "Beneath the elms" (1880)
- An Evening Service. Magnificat & Nunc Dimittis (1881)
- Crossing the Bar, partsong for choir (1900)
- Abide with me (1904)
- Far from my heavenly Home. Anthem (1904)
- Thy Will be done. Hymn-Anthem for Soprano or Tenor (1904)
- Jesu! the Very Thought of Thee. Hymn Anthem for Soprano Solo and Chorus (1904)
- Until God's day: sacred song, music Henry Houseley, text Frank L. Stanton (1907)
