= Alfred Joseph Lowe =

- Born: August 1, 1789
- Died: August 10, 1856 (aged 67); Highfield House, Nottingham
- Resting place: Sneinton
- Occupations: Horticulturalist, meteorologist and astronomer
- Organization(s): Nottingham Mechanics' Institution; Nottingham Harmonic Society; Royal Meteorological Society
- Children: Edward Joseph Lowe

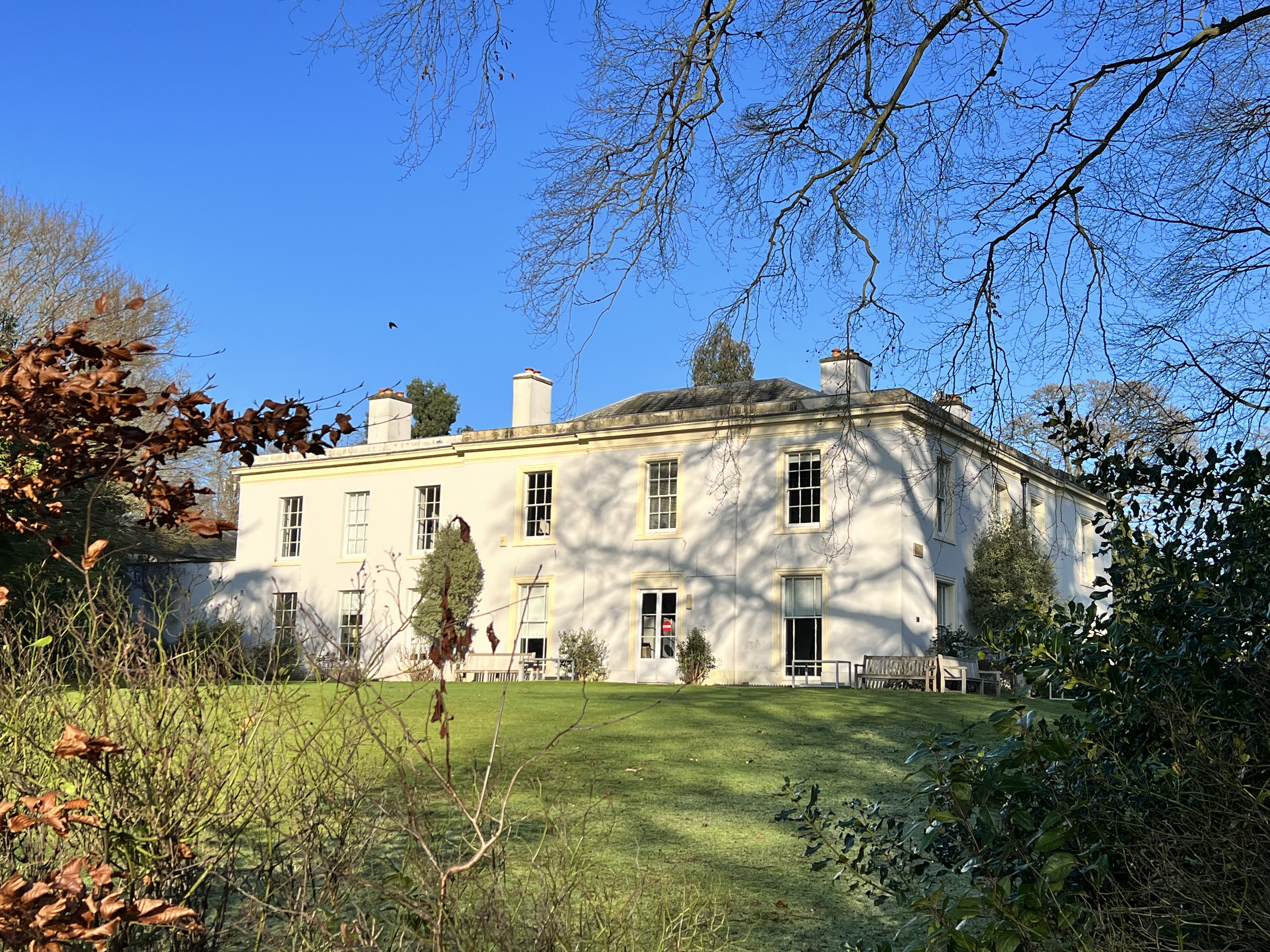
Highfield House, University Park, Nottingham

Alfred Joseph Lowe (1 August 1789 – 10 August 1856) J.P. was a horticulturalist, meteorologist and astronomer based in Nottingham.

== Life ==
He was born on 1 August 1789, the son of Joseph Hurst Lowe (1766-1817) and Elizabeth Langstaff (1770-1826). He was baptised on 13 September 1789 at High Pavement Chapel.

He married Charlotte Octavia Swann (1792-1865), daughter of Edward Swann, Mayor of Nottingham, in St Mary's Church, Nottingham on 30 October 1812. They had the following children.

- Captain Alfred Hurst Lowe (1814-1870)
- Charlotte Lavina Lowe (1816-1899)
- Marianne Agnes Lowe (1817-1884)
- Edward Joseph Lowe (1825-1900)
- Colonel Arthur Swann Howard Lowe (1826-1888)

He died on 10 August 1856 at Highfield House, Nottingham and was interred at the family vault in Sneinton.

== Career ==
He was a magistrate for Nottinghamshire, and for many years vice-chairman of the Radford Union. He was Sheriff of Nottingham in 1812–13.

He was a founding member and treasurer of the Nottingham Mechanics' Institution. In 1846 he started a vocal music class which evolved into the Nottingham Harmonic Society.

He applied the principle of the Jacquard loom to the bobbin net lace machine which produced the pattern in the lace at the same time as manufacturing the fabric. This invention resulted in a significant improvement in productivity of lace, and turned Nottingham into the centre of mechanical lace production in England.

As a horticulturalist, he developed the estate at Highfield House, Nottingham by planting Cedrus deodara, Cupressus excelsa, Cryptomeria Japonica, Aurucaria Ombricata, Scotch pine, Portuguese laurels, myrtles and Arbutus. In the Nottingham Horticultural competition of 1853 he was awarded the Silver Cup for the best collection of greenhouse plants.

As a meteorologist and astronomer, he built an observatory at Highfield House, which was equipped with a barometer, a telescope on the roof, Negretti thermometers to determine terrestrial radiation and solar radiation, wet and dry bulb thermometers by Barrow, minimum and maximum thermometers by Bennett, rain gauges, an ozonometer, a wind vane 54 feet (16 m) high with Lind's anemometer. He and his son Edward Joseph Lowe were founder members of the Meteorological Society, which later became the Royal Meteorological Society.
