= St Mark's Church, Nottingham =

Demolished Anglican church in Nottingham, England, dedicated to Mark the Evangelist

- St Mark's Church, Nottingham
- 52°57′30″N 1°8′44″W
- OS grid reference: SK 57495 40446
- Country: England
- Denomination: Church of England
- Churchmanship: Broad Church

History
- Dedication: Mark the Evangelist
- Consecrated: 8 April 1856

Architecture
- Architect: Robert Jalland
- Style: Early English Period
- Groundbreaking: 15 June 1853
- Completed: 1856
- Demolished: 1958

Specifications
- Capacity: 1,100

Administration
- Province: York
- Diocese: Diocese of Southwell
- Parish: Nottingham

St Mark's Church, Nottingham, was a Church of England church in Nottingham, Nottinghamshire, England between 1856 and 1958. The section of Huntingdon Street where the church was located was formerly called Windsor Street.

== History ==
The foundation stone was laid in the presence of the Lord Bishop on 15 June 1853 by Robert Holden Esq of Nuthall Temple. The foundation stone included an inscription deposited in a cavity of the stone which read

Hunc Lapidem Templi, Christo Salvatori consecrati, de Sancti Marci Evangelistæ nomine nuncupati. Robertus Holden, Armiger, locavit; Die Ivnii xv., A.D. MDCCCLIII

It was formed as a parish in 1855, from the parish of St Mary's Church, Nottingham. The site was a free gift from G. J. P. Smith. It consisted of 3176 sq yards of the old Clay Field and cost £375. The church building cost £4,000 (equivalent to £372,450 in 2025).

It was built as a Trustee's Church under the Act of Parliament of William IV. The trustees were Henry Kingscote of Spring Gardens, London, Francis Wright of Osmaston, Derbyshire, Revd. Charles Eyre of Rampton Hall, Nottinghamshire, and Revd. Joshua William Brooks, vicar of St Mary's.

It was designed by the architect Robert Jalland in the early English thin Gothic perpendicular style, with twin octagonals at the west end, crowned with pepper pots with crockets. There were 1,100 seats, half of them free from pew-rents. The church contained a nave with two aisles, and a chancel in a recess at the eastern extremity. The nave was separated from the aisles by two rows of octagonal piers with groined arches. A sculptured stone font was at the west end of the south aisle. The bell in the turret was rung for the first time on the morning of the consecration. There were galleries on each side supported against the middle of the piers. The large eastern window was divided by a transom, and exhibiting five under and five upper elongated lights with pointed arches. The four windows on either side were similarly divided with three upper and three lower lights each.

The church was consecrated by Rt. Revd. John Jackson, Bishop of Lincoln on 8 April 1856, three months after St Matthew's Church, Talbot Street. The singing was led by the choir of St Mary's.

== List of vicars ==
- Russell Cope 1856–1873 (afterwards vicar of St Paul's Church, Newport, Monmouthshire 1876–1877)
- William Felton 1873–1883 (afterwards rector of Thwing 1883 – c. 1908)
- Thomas Francis Boultbee 1883–1887 (afterwards vicar of Loddiswell 1887–1907)
- James Lewis 1887–1927

== Organ ==
The organ was installed by Samuel Groves of London, and was opened on 1 November 1857.

=== List of organists ===
- C.G.W. Wells 1857 – 1860 (formerly organist of St Paul's Church, Macclesfield, afterwards organist of St Mary's Church, Kirkdale, Liverpool)
- Mr Myers 1860 – 1862 (afterwards organist of St Paul's Church, George Street, Nottingham)
- Charles Rogers 1862 – 1867 (afterwards organist of Holy Trinity Church, Lenton)
- S.R. Stevenson 1867 – ????
- W.H. Heath ca. 1879
- Mr. Julian c. 1882
- W. Seymour c. 1887
- Ernest Smeeton 1898 - 1907 (afterwards organist at St Laurence's Church, Long Eaton)
- Alan James Derrick 1907–1909
- Herbert Charles Deavin ARCO c. 1913
- H.A Gascoigne 1915 – ca. 1934

== Closure ==
On the resignation of James Lewis in 1927, Canon Holbrook of Holy Trinity took charge of the parish. By order in Council 29 January 1930, the two parishes were united.

The church was demolished in 1958.
