= St Ann with Emmanuel, Nottingham =

Coordinates: 52°57′46″N 01°08′22″W

St. Ann with Emmanuel Church, Nottingham
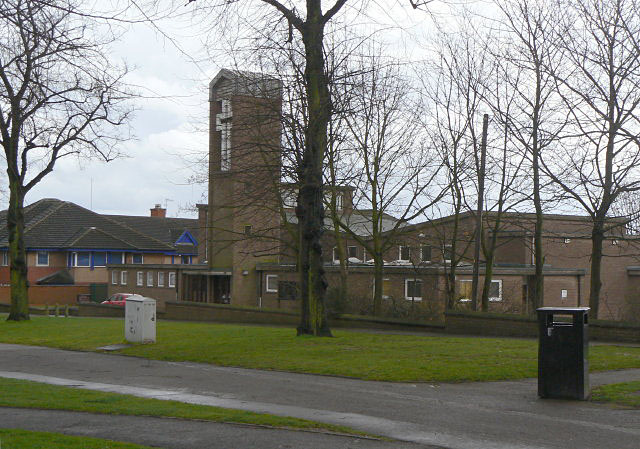
- St. Ann with Emmanuel Church, Nottingham
- Denomination: Church of England
- Churchmanship: Evangelical
- Website: www.stannwithemmanuel.com

History
- Dedication: St. Ann

Administration
- Province: York
- Diocese: Southwell and Nottingham
- Parish: Nottingham

Clergy
- Vicar: Reverend Maureen Collins

St. Ann with Emmanuel Church, Nottingham is a parish church in the Church of England in St Ann's, Nottingham.

== History ==
St. Ann with Emmanuel was opened in 1974. It replaced two previous churches of St. Ann's Church, Nottingham (by Robert Clarke, demolished 1971) and Emmanuel Church, Woodborough Road (by Watson Fothergill demolished 1972).

== Sources ==
- The Buildings of England, Nottinghamshire Nikolaus Pevsner
