= Lorenzo Valentine =

British organ builder (c.1835–1889)

Lorenzo Valentine (ca. 1835 - 1889) was a British organ builder based in Nottingham and Melton Mowbray.

== Family ==
He was born ca. 1835 in London the son of James Valentine and Harriet Graystone.

His son to Sarah Fletcher, Thomas Henry Valentine was baptised on 3 April 1853 at St Mary's Church, Lambeth.

On 10 December 1860 he married Sarah Walley in St Mary's Church, Newington. They had the following children:

- Emma Valentine (b. 1866)
- William James Valentine (1868 - 1914)
- Walter Lorenzo Valentine (b. 1869)
- Alfred George Valentine (b. 1871)
- Harriet Lucy Valentine (b. 1872)
- Sarah Elizabeth Valentine (b. 1875)
- Charles Edward Valentine (b. 1878)
- Claude Henry Valentine (b. 1880)

== Career ==
He was apprenticed to Samuel Groves in London. From 1859 to 1861 he was in partnership with Charles Lloyd (another of Samuel Groves’ apprentices) in Nottingham. They were based at 19 William Street and 6 Sherwood Street, Nottingham.

in 1861 he was charged at Melton Mowbray police court of having two iron crowbars, the property of Gideon Cook. With William Whalley, basket-maker, his father-in-law, he was committed to the assizes for trial in July 1861., but was found not guilty. He was in court again 3 years later when he appeared at the Petty Sessions on 3 May 1864 when he was found to have not paid the poor rates.

In the 1870s he traded on Scalford Road in Melton Mowbray as an Organ Builder, Pianoforte and Harmonium Manufacturer.

He filed a petition in the Leicester County Court in October 1879 for the liquidation of his affairs to a liability of £350.

By the 1880s he was trading from the Market Place, Melton Mowbray.

== Organs built ==
- Vicar Lane Chapel, Coventry 1859 (organ built by Samuel Groves, finished by Lloyd and Valentine)
- Union Workhouse, Melton Mowbray, Leicestershire 1859
- Scalford Church 1859
- Melton Mowbray Wesleyan Church 1859
- St George's Church, Leicester 1860 additions
- All Saints Church, Loughborough 1860
