= St Luke's Church, Nottingham =

St. Luke's Church, Nottingham
- St. Luke's Church, Nottingham
- 52°57′17″N 1°8′10″W
- Country: England
- Denomination: Church of England
- Churchmanship: Broad Church

History
- Dedication: St. Luke

Architecture
- Architect: Robert Jalland
- Groundbreaking: 1861
- Completed: 1864
- Closed: 1923
- Demolished: October 1925

Administration
- Province: York
- Diocese: Diocese of Southwell
- Parish: Nottingham

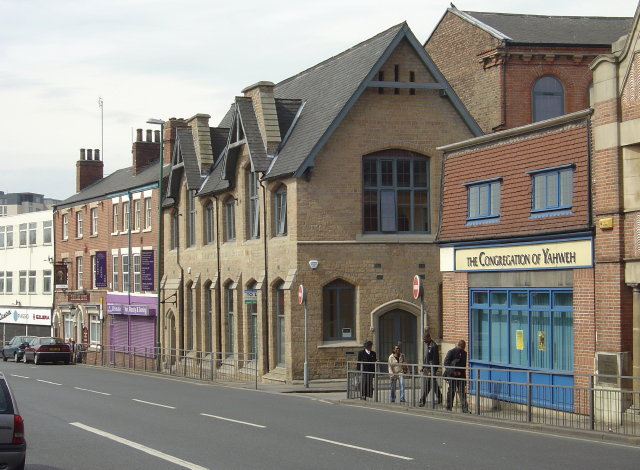

St. Luke's Church, Nottingham, was a Church of England church in Nottingham at the junction of Carlton Road and St. Luke's Road near Sneinton between 1862 and 1923.

== History ==
It was created out of the parish of St. Mary's Church, Nottingham, through the impetus of the vicar of St. Mary's, Joshua William Brooks. The trustees of St. Luke's were Thomas Adams, Lace Manufacturer, Lieutenant Colonel Robert Holden, of Nuthall Temple, Revd. Edmund Hollond and Revd. Charles Bridges.

The foundation stone was laid on 2 July 1861. In October 1862, the Commissioners' architect checking on the building declared it unsafe. The roof was too heavy and the walls had bowed out. It was described as a very plain, unpretending structure, an undivided parallelogram, 72 ft long, and 55 ft wide. Extensive repairs were needed to remedy the situation. The cost of the original building was £2,977 (equivalent to £312,960 in 2025),, but the repairs cost another £600 - £700.

The first incumbent was Henry Edwin Daniel, a Cambridge graduate. Shortly after his appointment, he died on 29 August 1865 of typhoid.

In 1879 the parish of St. Philip's Church, Pennyfoot Street, was taken out of St. Luke's parish.

By 1923, the population of St. Luke's had dwindled and the church was united with St. Philips. The decision was made to close St. Luke's and sell the site. It was demolished shortly afterwards.

== Incumbents ==
- Edwin Daniel 1863 - 1865
- Edward Rogers 1865 - 1900
- John Mervyn Glass 1900 - 1905 (formerly curate of St Andrew's Church, Clifton, Bristol)
- Walter Clement 1905 - 1910
- Frank Johnson Taylor 1910 - 1924

== Closure ==
The church was demolished in October 1925. The site is now occupied by The Congregation of Yahweh.
