= St Barnabas' Church, Derby =

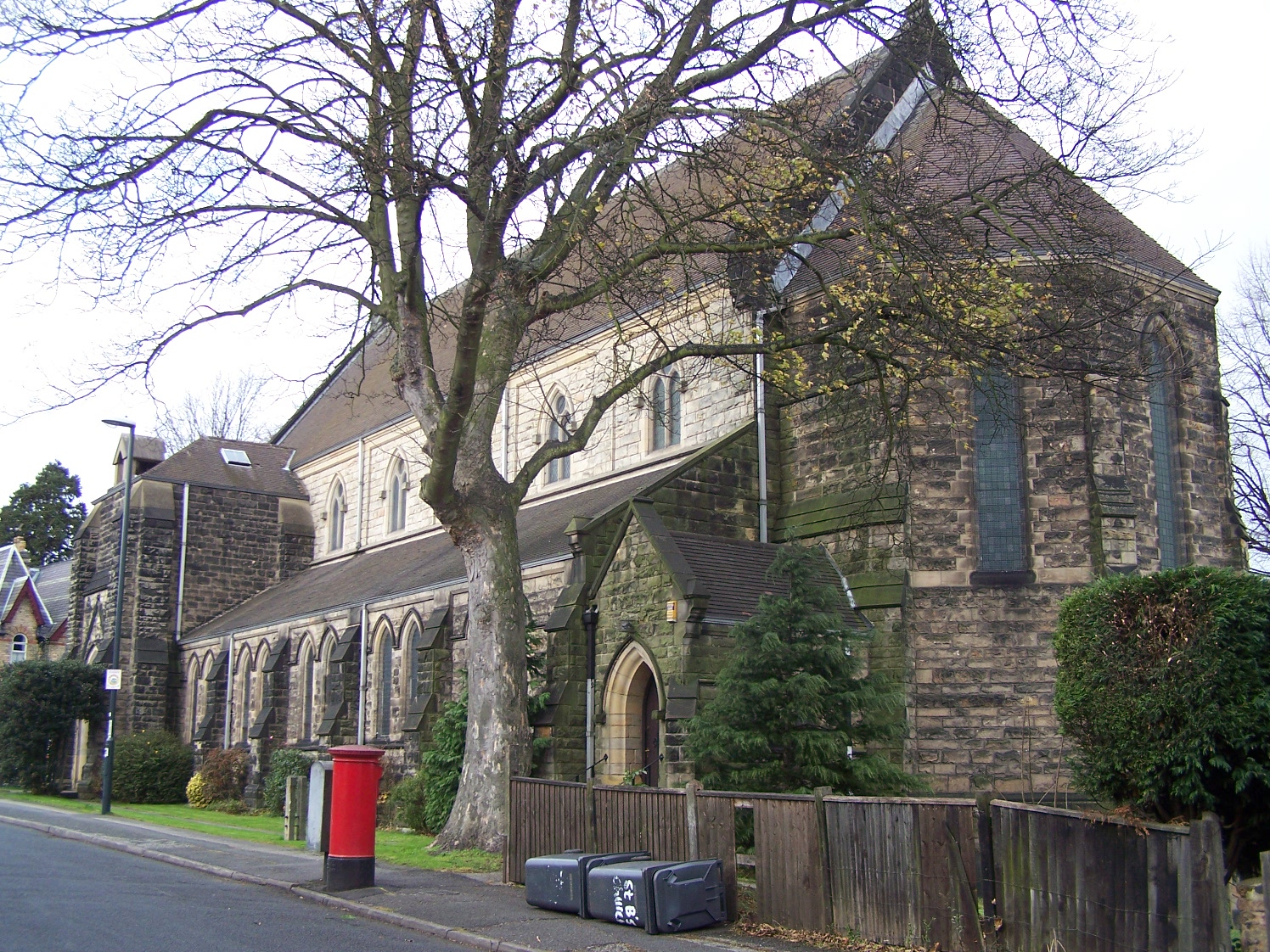
- St Barnabas’ Church, Mackworth, Derby

- Location within Derbyshire
- 52°55′32.1″N 1°30′3.26″W
- Location: Derby, Derbyshire
- Country: England
- Denomination: Church of England

History
- Dedication: St Barnabas
- Consecrated: 7 October 1885

Architecture
- Heritage designation: Derby Local List
- Architect: Arthur Coke-Hill
- Groundbreaking: 18 October 1884
- Completed: 1 October 1885

Administration
- Diocese: Diocese of Derby
- Archdeaconry: Derby
- Deanery: Derby North
- Parish: St Barnabas, Derby

St Barnabas' Church, Derby is a Church of England parish church in Derby, Derbyshire.

== History ==
A mission church was established on the site of the current church in the 1870s but this became inadequate for the needs of the district. The foundation stone for the new church was laid on 18 October 1884 by George Curzon, 1st Marquess Curzon of Kedleston. The architect was Arthur Coke-Hill and the contractors were Walker and Slater. Construction of the nave, north and south aisles was rapid and it was opened less than one year later on 1 October 1885. The walls were faced externally with Coxbench stone. Internally they were finished with rough stucco with Bath and Handsworth stone dressings. The roofing tiles came from J.C. Edwards of Ruabon, North Wales, and the heating apparatus was installed by Musgrave and Company of Belfast. It was consecrated one week later on 7 October 1885 by the Bishop of Southwell.

The chancel was added in 1903-04 and dedicated on 22 March 1904 by the Bishop of Southwell. The oak screen was given in memory of Miss Mary Shaw, by her brothers, Messrs. W.J. and James Shaw, and her sister, Mrs Stuart Thirlby. The pulpit was given in memory of Mr. James Bates of Heyworth Street, by his family. The lectern was given by Mrs. R. Jefferson in memory of her parents, Mr. and Mrs. Redfern of Etwall. The oak reredos, choir and clergy stalls, and two oak screens which formed the clergy vestry were designed and executed by Messrs. Jones and Willis of Birmingham. Rust of London provided the green and blue chancel floor tiles.

== Organ ==
A pipe organ was installed by Charles Lloyd of Nottingham at a cost of £230 and opened on Easter Day 1889. A specification of the organ can be found on the National Pipe Organ Register.
