= Edward Joseph Lowe =

British botanist, meteorologist and astronomer

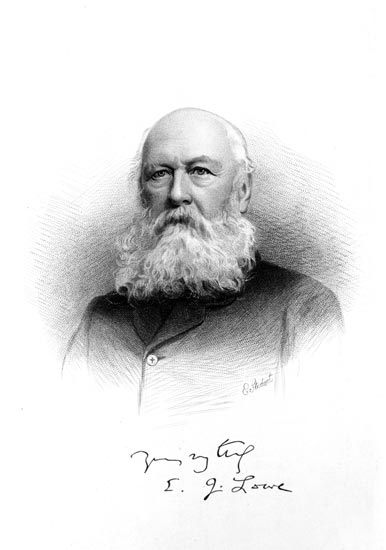
E. J. Lowe (from Fern Growing, 1892, Peter Boyd Collection)

Edward Joseph Lowe FRS FGS FRAS FLS (11 November 1825 – 10 March 1900) was a British botanist, meteorologist and astronomer, who published papers on a wide variety of subjects, including luminous meteors, sunspots, the zodiacal light, meteorological observations during the 1860 solar eclipse (at Fuente del Mar, near Santander), conchology, ferns, grasses and other plants.

== Biography ==
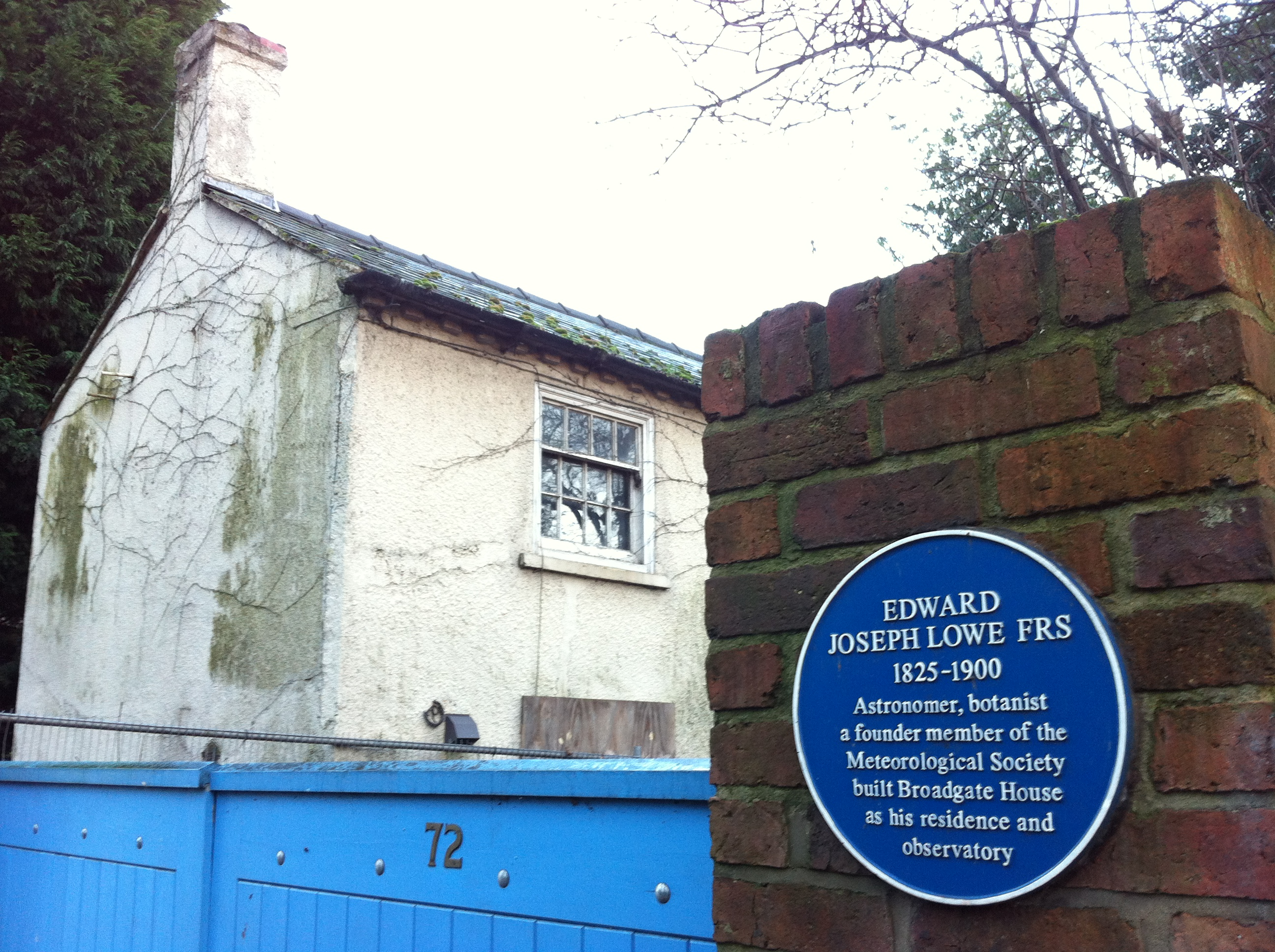
Broadgate House in Beeston, Nottinghamshire, Lowe's observatory and residence

Lowe was born in Highfield House, University Park, Nottinghamshire, into a well-off family. The son of Alfred Joseph Lowe, he began his scientific observations at the age of 15. His father had a keen scientific interest, especially in relation to astronomy and meteorology, enthusiasms he passed on to his son. Lowe's interest in ferns led to his studying them. His most noted work was Ferns: British and Exotic and consisted of eight illustrated volumes published in London by Groombridge and Sons in 1856. The bookplates of which were drawn by A. F. Lydon and engraved by Benjamin Fawcett. He collaborated on observations of luminous meteors with Professor Baden Powell of Oxford. Lowe invented the dry powder test for ozone in the atmosphere.

He was elected to Corresponding membership of the Manchester Literary and Philosophical Society in 1857, was one of the founders and original Fellows of the Meteorological Society and a Fellow of the Royal, the Geological, the Linnean, the Royal Astronomical and other learned Societies.

His candidature citation for the Royal Society read: The Author of "A Treatise on Atmospheric Phenomena" "Prognostications of the weather or signs of atmospheric changes." "a paper on 278 thunderstorms" & the Conchology of Nottingham, & various Papers on zodiacal light, meteors, 'Solar spots, Lana & Freshwater shells &c published in the Transactions of the British Association, Royal Astronomical Society, Zoological Society- &c – The discoverer of a new method of propagating cuttings of plants by the application of collodium. Distinguished for his acquaintance with the sciences of Meteorology & Natural History. Eminent asa Meteorologist – Having Published works on that Science. – and being actively employed in the cultivation of it

After the Great Exhibition of 1851, plans were launched for a public observatory in Nottingham. Henry Lawson offered his collection of astronomical telescopes, but the project failed through lack of government funding. Lawson persuaded Lowe to accept the instruments for an observatory at his home in Beeston, Nottinghamshire built in 1849. Broadgate House opened as an observatory 1855, and had a rotating cupola roof. The Beeston Observatory was mainly for meteorological observations. As well as the usual meteorological instruments it included an Earthquake Pendulum, which ascended 33 ft to the top of the building. The pendulum rod was of deal wood and terminated in a loaded bulb of brass and lead of 2 lbs in weight with a steel point which acted upon a smooth surface of hard baked chalk. When the top of the building was distributed by the shock of an earthquake, the steel point would inscribe a result in the chalk. At the top of the house, he installed Electrometers with lighting wires conducted from trees around the building. These were fed to two gilded balls and cylinders for determining the negative and positive character of the electricity and the relative amount.

Lowe's father, Alfred also built another observatory in Beeston behind 9 Lilac Grove near Beeston railway station. This survived until it was demolished in 1965.

A Government expedition was despatched to Spain to observe the solar eclipse of 18 July 1860 and Lowe was placed in charge of the meteorological department in Santander. In 1866 he was the local secretary to the British Association at the Nottingham meeting, and in 1868 president of the Nottingham Literary and Philosophical Society.

As a botanist he is denoted by the author abbreviation E.J.Lowe when citing a botanical name.

He married Anne Allcock (1829-1911), daughter of George Allcock, in St Mary's Church, Nottingham on 2 January 1849. They had the following children:

- Major Alfred Edward Lawson Lowe (1849–1888)
- Hugh Lee Peyton Lowe (1857–1933)

In 1882 he moved from Beeston to Shirenewton Hall, near Chepstow, Monmouthshire, where he died on 10 March 1900.

== Bibliography ==
- Our Native Ferns, or a History of the British Species and their Varieties. Groombridge, London 1845.
- A Treatise on Atmospheric Phaenomena. Longman, London 1846.
- The Conchology Of Nottingham, or a Popular History Of The Recent Land and Fresh Water Mollusca Found in the Neighbourhood. Bartlett, London 1853.
- Ferns, British and Exotic (8 volumes). London: Groombridge and Sons. 1857.
- A Natural History of British Grasses. Groombridge, London 1857.
- Beautiful-Leaved Plants, being a Description of the Most Beautiful-Leaved Plants in Cultivation in this Country. Groombridge, London 1861.

== Gallery ==
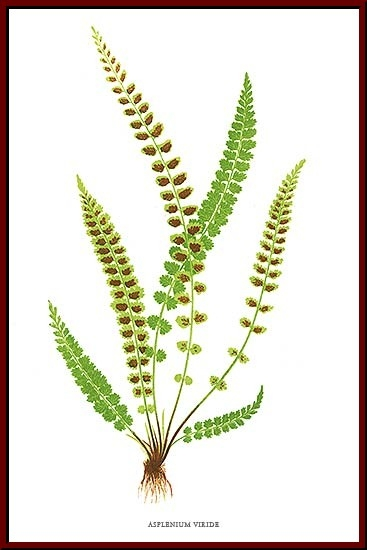
Asplenium viride

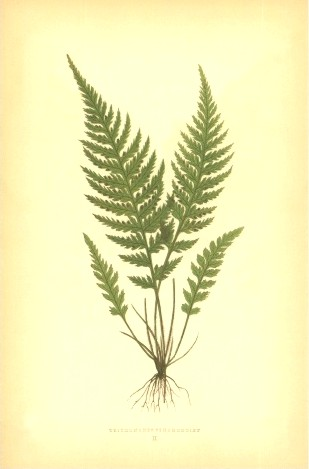
Fern
