= Emmanuel Church, Nottingham =

- Emmanuel Church, Nottingham
- 52°57′50″N 1°8′41″W
- OS grid reference: SK 57544 41064
- Country: England
- Denomination: Church of England
- Churchmanship: Broad Church

History
- Dedication: Emmanuel
- Consecrated: 27 January 1885

Architecture
- Architect: Watson Fothergill
- Groundbreaking: 24 January 1884
- Completed: 17 March 1893
- Construction cost: £5,000
- Closed: Whit Sunday 1972
- Demolished: 1972

Administration
- Province: York
- Diocese: Diocese of Southwell
- Parish: Nottingham

Emmanuel Church, Nottingham was a Church of England church in Nottingham on Woodborough Road between 1883 and 1972.

== History ==
The foundation stone was laid on 24 January 1884 by Mrs. Henry Wright of Heath House, Hampstead, widow of the late Revd. Henry Wright. At the service which followed the laying of the stone, the preacher was the Dean of Ripon, Very Revd. William Fremantle. It was built to designs by the local architect Watson Fothergill. The nave was completed at a cost of £5,000 (equivalent to £560,000 in 2025) and consecrated on 27 January 1885 by the Bishop of Southwell, Right Revd. George Ridding. It was constructed of Coxbench stone and the interior was lined with red brick. The columns were made of Darley Dale and Gorse Hill stone in alternate courses. The contractor was Smith and Lunn of Newark, the ironwork was made by Mr. Hodgkinson of Coventry, and the heating apparatus was installed by Haden and Sons of Trowbridge, Wiltshire. There were 600 free seats, and a parish of 6,000. It was situated on Woodborough Road. The patrons of the church were an Evangelical charity known as Hyndman's Trustees, who gave £2,000 to the building fund.

The chancel and organ chamber were added in 1892-93 and consecrated by the Bishop of Southwell on 17 March 1893. It comprised a high dado of glazed Minton tiles, continued as a reredos over the altar, with ecclesiastical symbols executed in encaustic work. The new chancel was designed by Watson Fothergill and built by the contractor Enoch Kent of Nottingham.

In the early 1970s it merged with St. Ann's Church, Nottingham and a new parish of St. Ann with Emmanuel, Nottingham was formed.

== Incumbents ==
- Frederick William Paul 1886 - 1892
- Llewellyn Henry Gwynne 1892 - 1899
- William Ernest Ives 1899 - 1904
- Frederick William Paul 1904 - 1917
- Richard Eardley Thomas Bell 1917 - 1918
- Francis Josiah Pratt 1918 - 1927
- Howard Henry Taylor 1927 - 1932
- Patrick Kevin Horan 1932 - 1946
- Francis Henry Outram 1946 - 1950
- Arthur Henry Brown 1950 - ????

== Organ ==
The earlier church organ was given to Lady Bay church in 1903. A new 3 manual organ by Compton and Musson was installed in 1903. The opening recital was given on 12 November 1903 by Haydon Hare, organist of Great Yarmouth Parish Church. A specification of the organ can be found on the National Pipe Organ Register.

=== List of organists ===
- George Middleton (afterwards organist of Broad Street Wesleyan Church)
- Walter Henry Moore 1887 - 1894
- George Middleton (formerly organist of Broad Street Wesleyan Church)
- Edward U. Ireland 1900 - 1933 (formerly organist of St Anne's Church, Baslow)
- James Harold Alton 1933 - 1936 (Formerly organist of Eastwood Parish Church. Later organist of St. John the Baptist Church, Beeston)
- James E Harper ca. 1939
- Henry Harold Snell c.1953-1969
- Robert John Taylor 1969 - 1972 (later organist and choirmaster Church of St. Mary the Virgin and All Souls, Bulwell)

== Closure ==
The church was demolished in 1972.
