= Lovell Clarke =

Herbert Lovell Clarke (15 August 1881 - 4 April 1962) was Archdeacon of Leeds from 1940 until 1950.

Clarke was born into an eminent ecclesiastical family: his father was the first Anglican Archbishop of Melbourne. He was educated at Magdalen College School, Oxford and St John's College, Cambridge. He was Assistant Missioner at Lady Margaret Church, Walworth then a Curate at Wimbledon. He was Vicar of All Saints' Church, Nottingham from 1913 until 1923, during which time he also served with the Sherwood Foresters. Later he was Vicar of Armley from 1923 to 1933; Rector of Barwick-in-Elmet from 1933 to 1942; Rural Dean of Whitkirk from 1938 to 1943; and Vicar of Horsforth from 1944 to 1951.
