= All Saints' Church, Nottingham =

Church in Nottingham, England

Coordinates: 52°57′36″N 1°9′42″W

All Saints' Church Nottingham
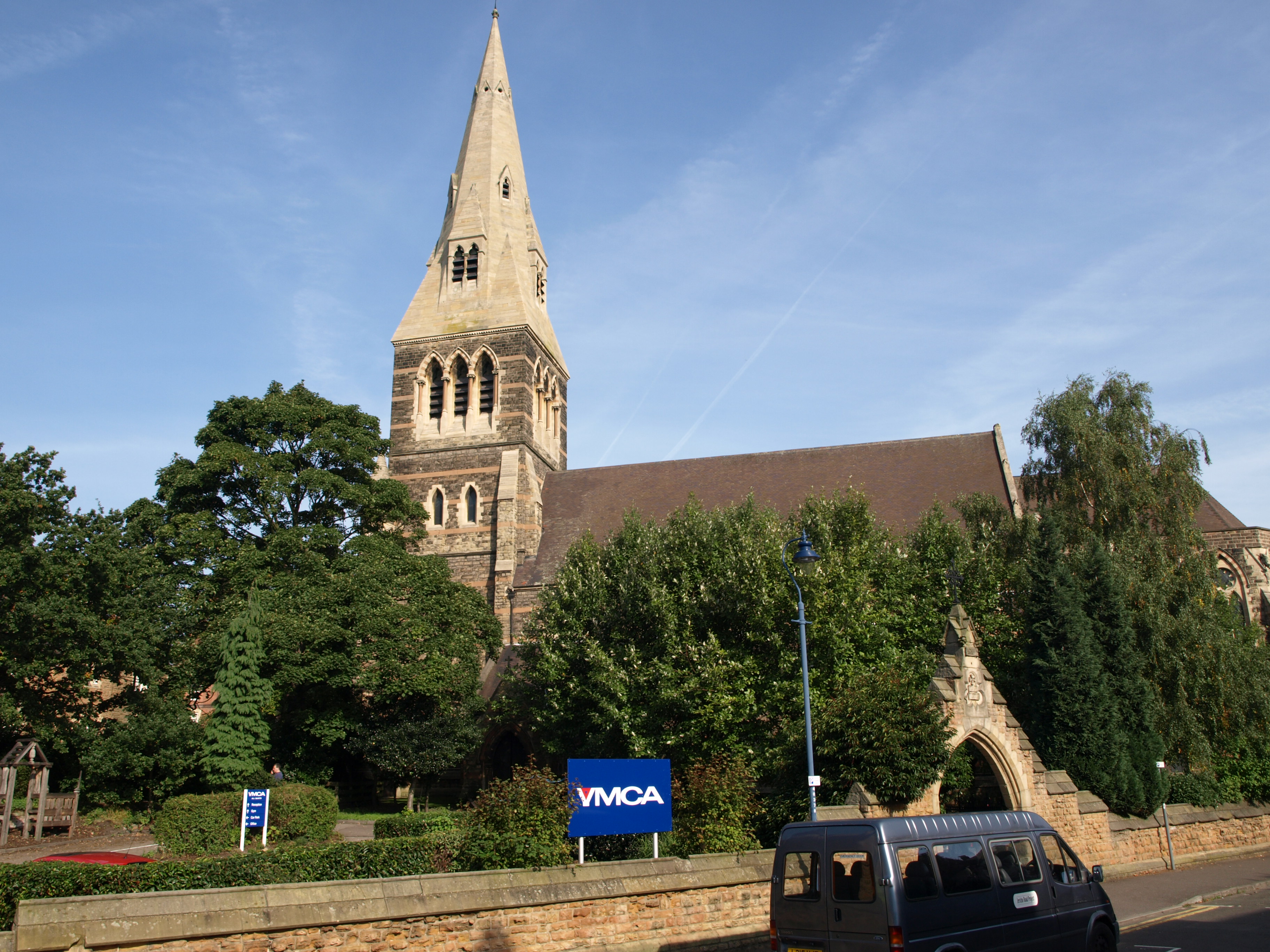
- All Saints' Church Nottingham
- Denomination: Church of England
- Churchmanship: Broad Church
- Website: http://www.nottinghamchurches.org

History
- Dedication: All Saints'

Architecture
- Architect: Thomas Chambers Hine
- Style: Gothic Revival
- Groundbreaking: 1863
- Completed: 1864
- Construction cost: £25,000

Specifications
- Capacity: 300

Administration
- Province: Province of York
- Diocese: Southwell and Nottingham
- Parish: St Peter and All Saints

Clergy
- Rector: Christopher Harrison

All Saints' Church, Nottingham, is an Anglican church in Nottingham, England.

The church is Grade II listed by the Department for Digital, Culture, Media and Sport as it is a building of special architectural or historic interest.

== Background ==
It was formerly the Parish Church of All Saints', Nottingham, and then became one of the two churches of the parish of Nottingham, St. Peter & All Saints', on their merger in December 2002. Following a further merger in September 2007, it became one of three parish churches within the parish of All Saints', St. Mary's and St. Peter's, Nottingham. The building itself is a large example of Victorian church architecture.

A map of the parish is available on Google Maps.

== History ==
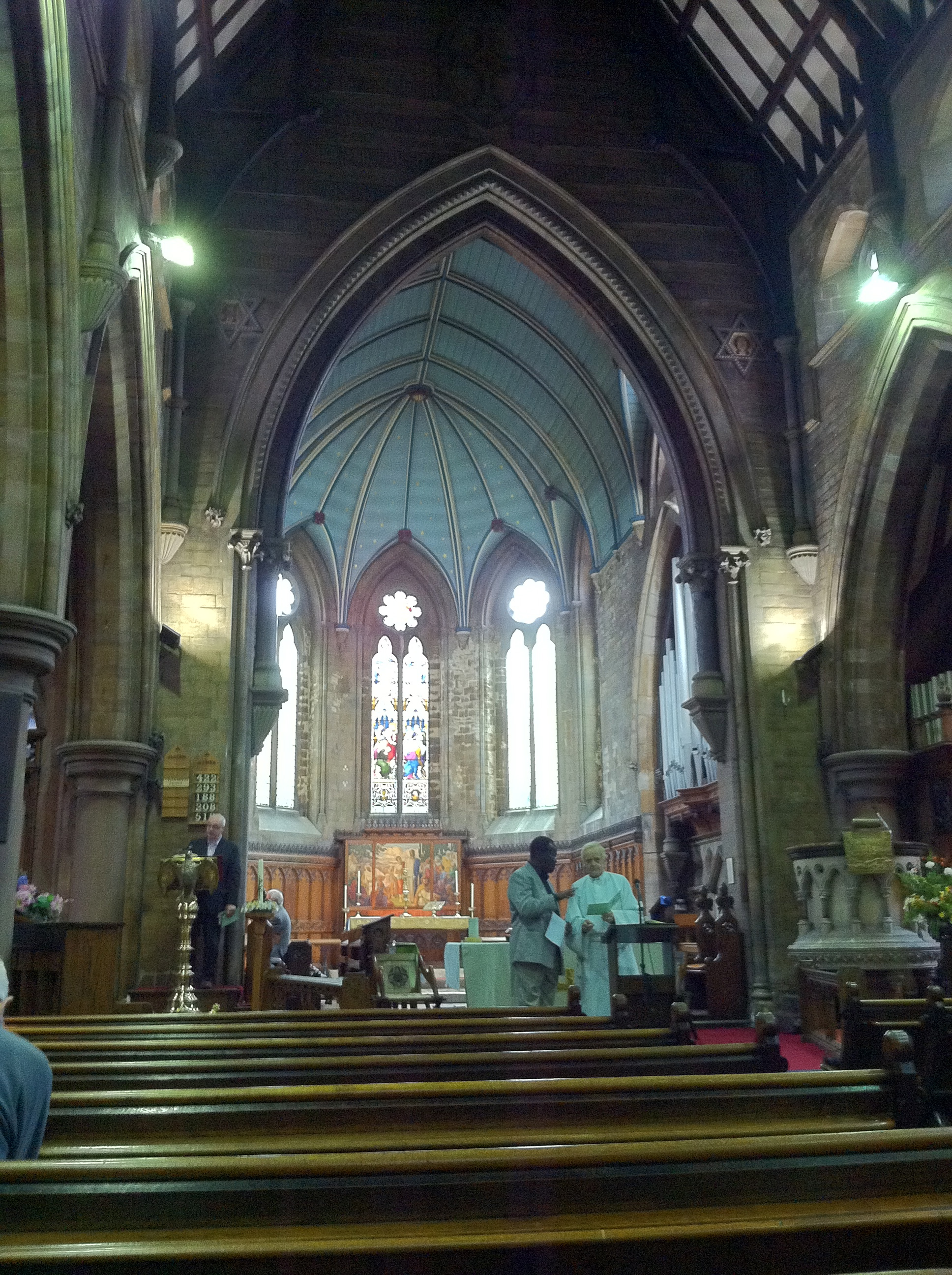
The nave and chancel

The church was built in 1863–64, mainly in sandstone. Along with the church, a large parsonage and a church school were built at the sole cost (some £10,000) (equivalent to £1,100,000 in 2025), of William Windley JP, a local philanthropist. With all of the ancillary building, the total cost was £25,000 (equivalent to £2,750,000 in 2025).

The church was built in Gothic Revival style to seat 500, and has a fine broach spire reaching 175 feet (53 m) tall (8th tallest building in Nottingham) and housing a ring of ten bells (the heaviest weighing 16 cwt). The architect was Thomas Chambers Hine, of Nottingham.

The church was consecrated on 3 November 1864. 1200 crammed into the 800 seats and there was a large attendance of clergy. The choir of St. Mary's Church were accompanied by Miss Fanny Brookes on the harmonium. The Rt. Revd. John Jackson, Bishop of Lincoln, performed the consecration service in the presence of the new pastor, Joshua William Brooks.

At the time of its construction, All Saints' Parish was a new wealthy suburb outside the old city boundary of Nottingham on an area previously known as Sandfield. The expansion had been as a result of the 1830s cholera epidemic. With the continued expansion of the City of Nottingham, the parish became an inner-city area of Nottingham which suffered significant decline after the Second World War. By the 1980s it was designated an Urban Priority Area and the congregation declined to around 30–40 at the turn of the millennium.

The old school building, which had fallen out of use in the 1920s, was converted into small workspaces, and half of the original huge vicarage was converted into residences of young single people in the early 1980s. More recently in 2006, following protracted negotiations, the New Deal for Radford bought the old School to refurbish it for use by local organisations.

The church and many of the other buildings are now Grade II listed. It continues to be in use for regular Sunday morning services. Given the small congregation, discussions are underway as to whether there may be other joint uses of the space available.

=== List of incumbents ===
- Edwin Gyles 1864-1880
- Alfred Pearson 1880-1888 (afterwards vicar of St. Margaret's Church, Brighton)
- Hubert Arnold Gem 1888-1902 (afterwards vicar of St Mary's Church, Wirksworth)
- Thomas Wilson Windley 1902-1912
- Herbert Lovell Clarke 1912-1923 (afterwards vicar of St Bartholomew's Church, Armley)
- W.H.M. Lonsdale 1923-1929
- C.H. Weller 1929-1937
- Edward Frederick H Dunnicliffe 1937-1946 (afterwards vicar of St. Helen's Church, Selston)
- T.W. Richardson 1946-1950
- Charles W. Harrington 1950-1955
- John N.D. Perkins 1955-1979
- Paul George Watts 1980-1984
- Nigel Peyton 1985-1991
- David White 1992-1998
- Gilly Myers (priest-in-charge) 2000-2002

== Bells ==
The six bells were cast by John Taylor & Co of Loughborough on an oak bell frame. At installation in 1864 this was extended to accommodate two extra bells. The bells were tuned in the key of E, the heaviest weighing 17cwt.

In 1999 the bells were tuned and hung in a new steel frame with room for 10 bells. At the same time the redundant All Saints’ School bell was installed as a Sanctus bell. The Nottingham University Society of Change Ringers use the church for practice and also ring the bells for church services.

On 19 May 2019 the bells stopped ringing due to health and safety concerns. Damage to the spire had allowed for pigeons to enter the bell tower and nest. The damage was mainly to the floor above the bells, which had become rotten due to the large volumes of guano.

The project to restore the tower was taken on by the Nottingham University Society of Change Ringers, with the support of the Church. It consisted of a complete clean of the tower, removing approximately 2.2 tons of bird waste. It also saw the dismantling of the old floor, and construction of a new floor above the bells. This new floor serves as a load bearing platform in case of any future work which may be needed on the spire, and acts as a form of control for the bells. Finally it involved a total renovation of the ringing chamber.

On 8 February 2020 the bells were first heard again, during a test ring, then the bells were officially handed back to the Nottingham University Society of Change Ringers for ringing on 11 February 2020.

== Organ ==
The first organ was built by Lloyd and Dudgeon from Nottingham and was opened on 6 July 1865.

The current organ is by Norman and Beard and dates from 1906.

=== List of organists ===
- George Essex 1865 - 1883
- G. H. Woodhouse 1883 - 1899 (formerly organist of St Paul's Church, George Street, Nottingham)
- Arthur Richards 1899 - 1915
- Frederick William Hughes 1915 - 1918 (formerly organist of Horncastle Parish Church)
- Frederick George Ainsworth Wyatt 1918 - 1947 (formerly of St. Thomas' Church, Nottingham)
- Eric Rayner 1947 - 1972
- Peter C Price 1973 - 1977
- Malcolm Batchelor
- Jean Bruce
- Peter Moule
- Nowadays, there is no regular organist; a team of organists are shared between St Peter's and All Saints, headed by the Director of Music, Peter Siepmann.

== See also ==
- Listed buildings in Nottingham (Hyson Green and Arboretum ward)
- Nottingham University Society of Change Ringers
- St. Mary's Church, Nottingham
- St. Peter's Church, Nottingham
