= Highfield House, Nottingham =

Grade II listed building in University Park, Nottingham

Coordinates: 52°56′12.7″N 1°11′51.5″W

Highfield House
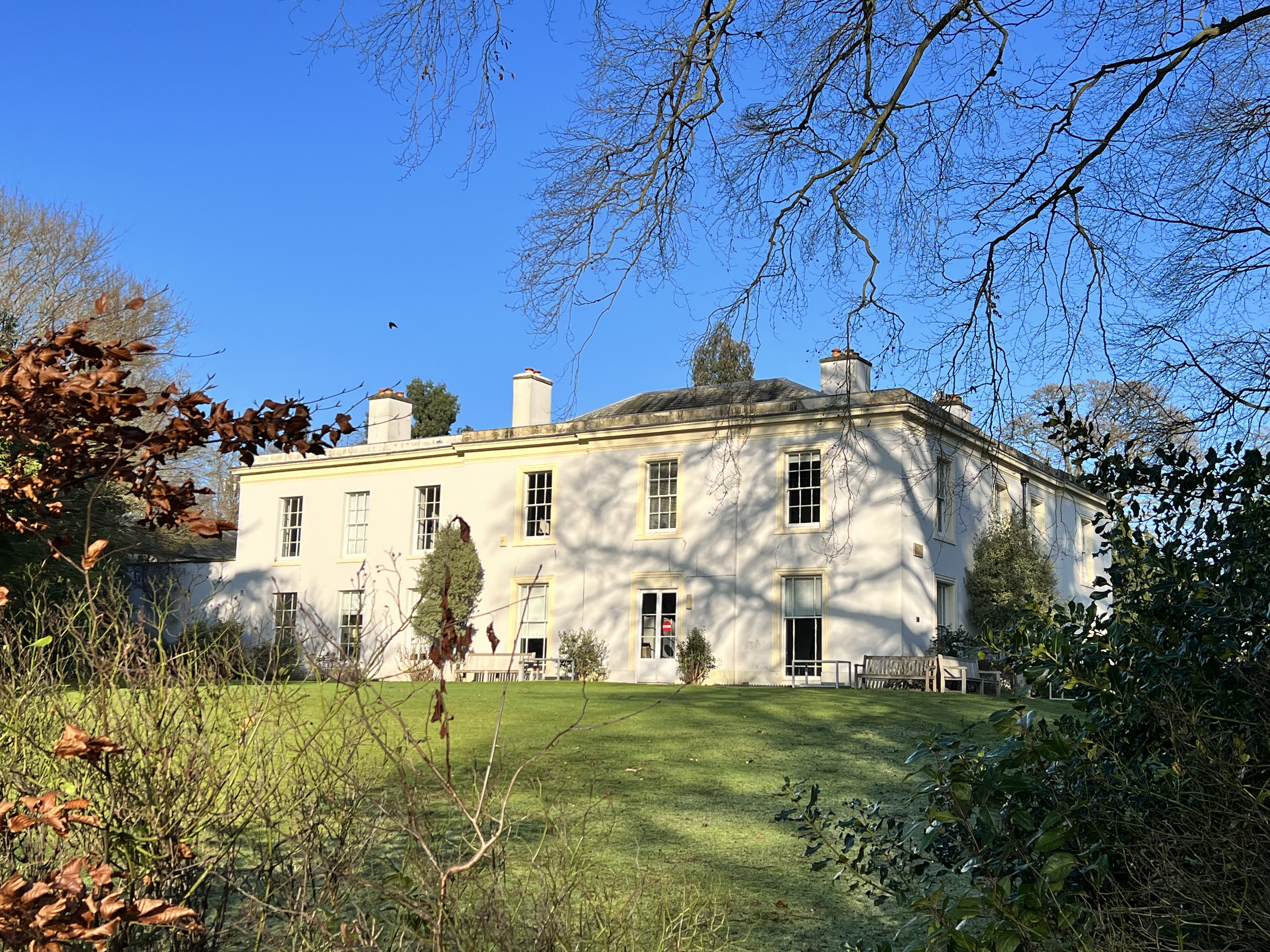
- Highfield House

- Location within Nottinghamshire

General information
- Location: University Park, Nottingham
- Completed: 1798

Design and construction
- Architect: William Wilkins the Elder
- Designations: Grade II listed

Highfield House is a Grade II listed building in University Park, Nottingham, in the Nottingham district, in the ceremonial county of Nottinghamshire, England.

== History ==
The building was designed by architect William Wilkins the Elder and was built for Joseph Lowe (1737-1810) a wool and linen draper of Long Row, Nottingham, also an alderman and three times Mayor of Nottingham.

On the death of Joseph Lowe, it was occupied by his son, Joseph Hurst Lowe (1766-1817) and Elizabeth Lowe (nee Langstaff) (1770-1826). On the death of Joseph Hurst Lowe it was occupied by his son, Alfred Joseph Lowe (1789 - 1856) and Charlotte Octavia Lowe (nee Swann) (1792-1865). Their son Edward Joseph Lowe built an observatory at the house for meteorology and astronomy. Both father and son were founder members of the Meteorological Society which later became the Royal Meteorological Society.

It was from the Highfield House Observatory that Edward Joseph Lowe published his meteorological observations as early as December 1843 and recorded the Aurora Borealis in October 1847.

In 1880, Edward left and in 1881 the house was put up for auction when it was described as a well-built Family Mansion, with complete outbuildings, extensive pleasure grounds, lake, walled kitchen garden, vineries, greenhouses, productive orchards and about 150 acres of beautifully undulated park and pasture land. It was sold to lace manufacturer, Henry Simpson.

The house was put up for sale again in 1919 and was sold to Jesse Boot, 1st Baron Trent who donated the estate to the University.

In 1930 the house became the home of the principal of Nottingham University College and later the Vice-Chancellor of the University. This persisted until the Vice-Chancellor vacated the property in the 1990s. The building now houses the Rights Lab, the Institute for Policy and Engagement and the Researcher Academy.
