= John Thornton Masser =

John Thornton Masser (24 June 1855 - 23 February 1929) was an organist and composer based in Nottingham.

== Life ==
John Thornton Masser was the son of Thomas Masser. He was educated at Bradford High School, Fulneck Moravian Settlement and Bramham College, Tadcaster.

On 11 July 1885 he married Jessie Margaret, the youngest daughter of Henry Legge of Holly Park, Crouch Hill, Middlesex.

From age 17 to 22 he worked in the family business, but then was articled to Thomas Bradley Chambers of Brighouse, senior partner in a Yorkshire firm of solicitors. He then spent some years with Torr and Company solicitors of Bedford Row, London.

Subsequently he practiced in Nottingham and was a member of the Incorporated Law Society, and the Nottingham Law Society.

== Musical career ==
He composed anthems, and his most popular work, a harvest cantata.

He also compiled and published a psalter and tune book, both of which were in constant use at Addison Street Congregational Church in Nottingham, where he was Hon. Organist and Choirmaster.

He assisted in the production of the Congregational Hymnal of 1916.
