= St Thomas' Church, Nottingham =

Demolished Anglican church in Nottingham, England, dedicated to Thomas the Apostle

St. Thomas's Church, Nottingham
- St. Thomas's Church, Nottingham
- 52°57′13″N 1°9′20″W
- Country: England
- Denomination: Church of England
- Churchmanship: Broad Church

History
- Dedication: St. Thomas

Architecture
- Architectural type: Classical
- Groundbreaking: 1854
- Completed: 1855
- Closed: 1926
- Demolished: 1930

Specifications
- Capacity: 800

Administration
- Province: York
- Diocese: Diocese of Southwell
- Parish: Nottingham

St. Thomas' Church, Nottingham was a Church of England church on Park Row in Nottingham between 1873 and 1926.

== History ==
The building was erected by Wesleyan Methodists led by Richard Mercer, bookseller. The foundation stone was laid on Park Row on 5 June 1854. The chapel opened in April 1855 and was known as 'The Wesleyan Congregational Free Church'. and also Mercer's Chapel.

It was purchased by the Church of England in 1873 and alterations were made by Thomas Chambers Hine. It was known as the Episcopal Church of St. Thomas and was consecrated by the Rt. Revd. Christopher Wordsworth the Bishop of Lincoln on 22 April 1873.

A full history of the church can be found on the Southwell and Nottingham DAC Church History Project.

=== List of incumbents ===
- 1873–1884 Walter Senior
- 1884–1888 Thomas Cleworth
- 1888–1894 Joseph Halloran
- 1894–1907 Martin Read
- 1907–1926 Charles Davis

== Organ ==
A 2-manual organ was installed in 1882 by Charles Lloyd and Co.

=== List of organists ===
- W.Telford Cockrem ca 1882
- Henry Houseley 1882–1888
- Frederick George Ainsworth Wyatt 1888–1918 (then organist of All Saints' Church, Nottingham)
- Cecil T Payne 1918 – 1926

== Closure ==
The church was merged with St. Matthew's Church, Talbot Street in 1926 and the building was demolished in 1930.
