= Addison Street Congregational Church =

- Addison Street Congregational Church
- 52°57′48.05″N 1°9′18.08″W
- Location: Nottingham
- Country: England
- Denomination: Congregational

Architecture
- Architect: Henry Sulley
- Groundbreaking: 1883
- Completed: 1884
- Construction cost: £6,000
- Closed: 1966

Specifications
- Length: 94 feet (29 m)
- Width: 47 feet (14 m)

Addison Street Congregational Church was a church in Nottingham. Built in 1884, it closed in 1966 when its congregation merged with the Sherwood Congressional Church, and the building later became a warehouse, before being demolished.

== History ==
The congregation was started as a daughter church from Castle Gate Congregational Centre. An iron mission church was opened in 1867 on Addison Street. When the congregation had the resources, they decided to replace this with a new building, and expended £6,000 on a new impressive church.

It opened on Wednesday 27 February 1884. The congregation decided in 1966 to merge with Sherwood Congregational Church and the worship at Addison Street building ceased in that year. The last Minister was Rev. Eric Way. By 1978 (and in practice earlier) the church had become a warehouse. It was later demolished to create school playing fields.

== Organ ==
A pipe organ was installed by Charles Lloyd. The opening recital was given on 5 February 1885 by Herbert Stephen Irons, organist of St. Andrew's Church, Nottingham. The organ was extended in 1930 by Roger Yates. A specification of the organ can be found on the National Pipe Organ Register.

The church's organists included John Thornton Masser.
