= Joshua William Brooks =

Joshua William Brooks, M.A. (1790 – 15 February 1882) was a priest in the Church of England.

== Family ==
Joshua William Brooks married Frances Summerscales on 1 January 1829 in Sandal Magna, West Riding of Yorkshire.

== Career ==
Brooks was ordained in 1820, and was successively

- Curate of East Retford, Nottinghamshire 1821–1827
- Domestic Chaplain to Viscount Galway 1821–1827
- Vicar of St John the Baptist Church, Clarborough and St Saviour's Church Retford Nottinghamshire 1827–1843
- Rector of St. Helen's Church, Grove 1837–1843
- Domestic Chaplain to William Vesey-FitzGerald, 2nd Baron FitzGerald and Vesey c. 1840
- Vicar of St. Mary's Church, Nottingham 1843–1864
- Prebendary of Lincoln 1858 - ca. 1882
- Rector of Great Ponton, 1864–1882

At St. Mary's he led a campaign to open new churches in Nottingham which resulted in:

- St. Matthew's Church, Talbot Street 1856
- St. Mark's Church, Nottingham 1856
- St. Luke's Church, Nottingham 1863
- St. Ann's Church, Nottingham 1864
- St Saviours in the Meadows, Nottingham 1864
- All Saints' Church, Nottingham, 1864

== Publications ==
- The Investigator, (editor), 1831–1836
- A Dictionary of Writers on the Prophecies
- Abdiel's Essays on the Advent and Kingdom of Christ, 1834
- Elements of Prophetical Interpretation, 1836

Religious titles
Preceded by George Wilkins	Vicar of St.Mary's Church, Nottingham; 1843–1864	Succeeded by Francis Morse
