= Robert Jalland =

British architect

Robert Jalland (13 January 1801 – 30 May 1883) was an architect based in Nottingham.

== Career ==
He was the son of Gibson Jalland and Elizabeth Strong and baptised in St Mary's Church, Nottingham on 25 January 1801.

He married twice:

- Jane Doyle (1813-12 October 1855) on 18 December 1838. This produced one daughter – Kathleen Elizabeth Jalland
- Mary Carr on 21 February 1860. This produced one son – Alfred Gibson Jalland.

He studied in the practice of Edward Staveley. The business became known as Staveley, Hawksley and Jalland. After Staveley's death in 1837, the company was renamed Hawksley and Jalland, but this partnership was dissolved on 2 September 1850.

He was in charge of the introduction of gas to Bingham, Nottinghamshire in 1854.

== Buildings and work ==
- Nottingham Mechanics' Institution 1845
- Belle Vue Reservoir, Nottingham 1851
- St. Mark's Church, Nottingham 1856
- St. Luke's Church, Nottingham 1864
