= St Bartholomew's Church, Nottingham =

St. Bartholomew's Church, Nottingham
- St. Bartholomew's Church, Nottingham
- 52°57′44″N 1°7′53″W
- Country: England
- Denomination: Church of England
- Churchmanship: Broad Church

History
- Dedication: St. Bartholomew

Architecture
- Architect(s): John Loughborough Pearson and Frank Loughborough Pearson
- Groundbreaking: 1899
- Completed: 1902
- Demolished: 1971

Administration
- Province: York
- Diocese: Diocese of Southwell
- Parish: Nottingham

St. Bartholomew's Church, Nottingham was a Church of England church in Nottingham on Blue Bell Hill Road between 1902 and 1971.

== History ==
The church was built to designs started by John Loughborough Pearson and completed by his son. Frank Loughborough Pearson.

It was funded by the Incorporated Church Building Society.

It was formed as a parish in 1903, from the parishes of St. Ann's Church, Nottingham and St. Mary's Church, Nottingham.

== Organ ==
A 2 manual pipe organ by Charles Lloyd and Co was installed in 1887.

== Closure ==
The church was demolished in 1971.
