= Nottingham University Society of Change Ringers =

Bellringers society

The Nottingham University Society of Change Ringers (NUSCR) is one of the oldest societies affiliated to the University of Nottingham Students' Union (where it is known as Bellringing Society), being founded in 1958. Its principal aim is to allow students from both the University of Nottingham and Nottingham Trent University to practise English Change Ringing. It also represents the University at the annual Northern Universities Association (NUA) Striking Competition each November.

== Aims ==
The aims of the society are:

- To promote ringing for Divine Service, in particular providing a band of ringers for All Saints' Church, Nottingham, which shall be The Society’s Home Tower
- To provide communication between members and to promote social activities
- To maintain the bells and their fittings at The Society’s Home Tower
- To ensure the continuation of The University of Nottingham Union [UNU] Bellringing Society

== History ==
In late 1957, a number of students (inc. Roger Baldwin and John Underwood) came to study at the University of Nottingham who were already experienced bellringers. They attended the practice at Nottingham, St. Peter. The inaugural meeting was held on 29 January 1958 and the Nottingham University Society of Change Ringers (NUSCR) was formed.

A separate practice night was held by the Society at St. Peter's between 1958 and 1960. In 1960, attempts were made to make the derelict bells at All Saints' ringable. This was only partially successful and the Society's practice night moved there from 1960-62. Due to the poor state of the bells, the Society then moved to Beeston where the bells required less work to make them ringable. During this period the Society did well. Local people (who were not students) were also taught to ring on the bells and this caused friction in the early 1970s. At an EGM on 17 March 1972 it was formally decided to leave Beeston and return to All Saints'.

Around 1995, a report gave the bells approximately 5 years before they would be unringable. Quotes were obtained to rehang the bells in a modern steel bellframe for ten bells (i.e. space for two extra treble bells in addition to the eight that were there). With some uncertainty the Society set out in 1996 to raise the initial quote of almost £12,000. A ring-a-thon was held, sponsored walks and various other fundraising activities. Surprisingly the money mounted up much more quickly than expected and discussion began to centre on whether it might be possible to augment the bells to ten also. This would require the original eight bells to be tuned (as they were cast in 1864 prior to modern bell tuning) at a further cost of £1800. In 1999, members of the Society helped to lower the eight bells out of the tower (the heaviest being 3/4 ton or 760 kg) and removed the old oak bellframe. Holes were then cut for the new steel frame and it was hoisted and bolted together. The old eight bells were tuned and returned for Easter 1999.

All Saints’ Church Tower also houses a small service bell, weighing approximately 1 cwt, cast by John Taylor & Co. in 1866. The former All Saints’ School bell, it was saved from the scrap heap by Rev. Bernard Baines, the then Honorary President of the Society, and was hung in the tower at the same time as the rehanging of the 8 bells in 1999. This bell is affectionately known as Bernard’s Bell, and it is chimed in his memory prior to service on the nearest Sunday to his death (31 May 2007).

The tenor was tested for the first time following restoration work on 23 January 2020; and on 8 February 2020 the complete ring of 10 bells were first heard again during a test ring, rung by the volunteers with the top 10 most hours into the project. Then the bells were officially handed back to the society for ringing on 11 February 2019. On 7 March 2019, a band formed entirely of undergraduate students rang a quarter peal of "Plain Bob Caters" to celebrate their return to the tower.

== Peals ==
As of 1 October 2014, the Society had rung 172 peals. Notable peals include 41 Surprise Minor and the first of NUSCR S Major & Maximus.

== Honorary president ==
The Society's first Honorary President was Paul Taylor (1914-1981), the last bell founding Taylor of John Taylor's bell foundry. Following his resignation, Rev. Bernard Baines was elected as the second Honorary President on 24 February 1981. Bernard Baines had been a curate at All Saints' Church and was very supportive of the Society during his time there. He had acted as Master of Ceremonies at the Annual Dinner for the previous three years. Bernard died (after a period of ill health) on 31 May 2007 aged 86.
