= Henry Farmer =

British organist and composer

Henry Farmer (13 May 1819 – 25 June 1891) was a British organist and composer based in Nottingham.

== Life ==
He was born in Nottingham, the third son of Mr. John Farmer. He was self-taught as a musician, but undertook some study in harmony with Sir Henry Bishop, and tuition under J. Wade Thirlwall.

He played violin in the orchestra when Felix Mendelssohn conducted his oratorio Elijah was premiered in Birmingham at the Triennial Music Festival on 26 August 1846.

He was organist of High Pavement Chapel in Nottingham from 1839 to 1879, and he was conductor of the Nottingham Harmonic Society from 1866 to 1880.

He published a violin tutor early in his life. His Mass in B flat was sketched by him in 1843 and published in 1847.

In later life he composed Six Short and Easy Trios for Violin, and an anthem, "I will Sing of the Mercies of the Lord".

He was a member of the Robin Hood Battalion from 7 April 1860 to 30 March 1878, ending up as captain.

He married Jane Walker Thompson (1820-1846) on 7 July 1842 in St Mary's Church, Nottingham. There were three children:

- Henry Purcell Farmer (1843-1850)
- Kate Neville Farmer (1845-1918)
- Arthur Thompson Farmer (1846-1847)

He married secondly Anne Bardsley (1825-1871). From this second marriage there were three children:

- Kate Neville Farmer (1845-1918)
- Annie Mary Bradley Farmer (1850-1904) who married Thomas Bayley (1846-1906)
- Emily B Farmer (b.1854)
