= Roger Yates (organ builder) =

British organ builder (1905–1975)

Roger Yates (1905 - 2 September 1975) was a pipe organ builder based initially in Nottingham and then Bodmin who flourished between 1928 and 1972.

== Background ==
He was born in 1905, the son of James Yates and his wife Helen. He was educated at Tonbridge School.

His career as an organ builder started in 1922 with an apprenticeship with Henry Willis & Sons and Lewis & Company Ltd in London,

In 1928 he Roger Yates purchased the business of Charles Francis Lloyd in Nottingham, and he remained in Nottingham until 1937.

He then transferred to Bodmin, Cornwall. After service in the Royal Navy during World War II he moved to the Old Rectory, Michaelstowe, Cornwall and his business flourished until illness in 1972.

== Noted instruments ==
- 1926 St Andrew's Church, Nottingham addition of a Tuba
- 1930 Front Street Methodist Church, Nottingham
- 1930 Congregational Church, Nottingham
- 1930 Methodist Church Wysall, Nottinghamshire
- 1930 Masonic Hall, 25 Goldsmith Street, Nottingham
- 1930 Addison Street Congregational Church, Nottingham (rebuild)
- 1932 Dolmetsch Foundation, Haslemere, Surrey
- 1934 St Mary the Virgin, Ilkeston, Derbyshire
- 1934 Park Hill Congregational Church, Derby Road, Nottingham
- 1936/37 Radcliffe-on-Trent, A.E. Allen Esq., 'Meadowcroft' (private residence)
- 1936 St Peter's Church, Ruddington, Nottinghamshire
- 1937 St Peter's Church, East Bridgford, Nottinghamshire
- 1937 St Leonard, Glapthorn, Northamptonshire
- 1937 All Saints' Church, Oakham, Rutland
- 1939 St Mary, Bozeat, Northamptonshire
- 1939 Good Shepherd, Romford, Essex
- 1948 Church of St John the Evangelist, Carrington
- 1948 St Catharine's Church, Nottingham now at St Peter and St Paul's Church, Shelford
- 1950 St Paul's Church, Daybrook, Nottingham
- 1952 St Catharine, Gloucester
- 1953 St Andrew, Kegworth, Leicestershire
- 1958 St James the Great, Kilkhampton, Cornwall
- 1962 All Saints, Ulcombe, Kent
- 1962 St Michael, Newquay, Cornwall
- 1963-64 St John the Evangelist, Taunton
- 1965-66 St Catherine, Gloucester
- 1969 Dartington College of Arts, Devon
- 1969-1972 Church of St Andrew, Stogursey, Somerset
