= St Matthew's Church, Talbot Street =

Demolished Anglican church in Nottingham, England, dedicated to Matthew the Apostle

St. Matthew's Church, Nottingham
- St. Matthew's Church, Nottingham
- 52°57′22″N 1°9′33″W
- Country: England
- Denomination: Church of England
- Churchmanship: Broad Church

History
- Dedication: St. Matthew

Architecture
- Architect: Henry Roberts
- Style: Early English Period
- Groundbreaking: 1853
- Completed: 1856
- Construction cost: £6,000
- Closed: September 1953
- Demolished: 1956

Specifications
- Capacity: 700 (450 from 1881)

Administration
- Province: York
- Diocese: Diocese of Southwell
- Parish: Nottingham

St. Matthew's Church, Talbot Street was a Church of England church in Nottingham between 1856 and 1956.

== History ==
It was formed as a parish in 1856, from the parish of St. Mary's Church, Nottingham. The site of 3,000 square yards in Sand Field off Talbot Street was bought by G.J.P. Smith from the Enclosure Commissioners in 1850 for £375 (equivalent to £43,647 in 2025), and given to the church.

The principal funding for the church of £4,500 came from the Church Extension Committee in Pall Mall.

It was a neat substantial structure in the Early English style, by the architect Henry Roberts, F.S.A., of London;. It had narrow lancets, a broad tower, and a tall broach spire. At their western ends the aisles terminated in two low octagonal turrets. The construction cost was £5,645 (equivalent to £525,620 in 2025),

It was built as a Trustee's Church under the Act of Parliament of William IV. The trustees were Henry Kingscote of Spring Gardens, London, Francis Wright of Osmaston, Derbyshire, Revd. Charles Eyre of Rampton Hall, Nottinghamshire and Revd. Joshua William Brooks, vicar of St. Mary's.

Fanny Brooks, wife of Joshua William Brooks, vicar of St. Mary's, inserted a canister beneath the foundation stone containing an inscription in Latin and a bottle containing coins.

The church was consecrated on 15 January 1856. The first incumbent was Revd. George Dundas, who published the church's own psalter and hymn book.

It was originally designed for 700 people, but this was reduced to 450 when the galleries were closed in 1881. It was built on a site released under the enclosure act.

In 1878 there was a fire in the roof, and the water used to extinguish it cause much damage to the organ and choir stalls. In 1887 there was a restoration and re-ordering under the supervision of William Dymock Pratt.

In 1926, the parish of St. Thomas' Church, Nottingham was merged with St. Matthew's.

== Incumbents ==
- George Dundas 1856-1883
- Thomas Boys Barraclough Ferris 1883-1907
- Ernest Perrin Percy Lea Thompson 1908-1921 (formerly Curate of Beccles, afterwards Vicar of Christ's Church, North Finchley)
- Sydney James Nisbet Wallace 1921-1927
- John Thomas Mellifont 1927-1933
- Joseph Charles Lasham 1933-1935
- William McKeag O’Kane 1935-1947
- Herbert Stanley Pearce 1947-1956

== Organists ==
- Henry Houseley ???? - 1870
- Mr. Taylor ca. 1881
- George Essex ca. 1893
- F.C. Webb
- F. Vernon Sadler ???? - 1928
- J. Gordon Wood 1928 - 1936 (formerly organist of St. Stephen's Church, Hyson Green)

== Closure ==
The church was demolished 1956. St. Matthew's School building which was directly adjacent to the church was left standing. The site is now in the planning stages for a new church by the Christian Centre, Nottingham.
