= St Philip's Church, Pennyfoot Street =

St. Philip's Church, Nottingham
- St. Philip's Church, Nottingham
- 52°57′04″N 1°8′12″W
- Country: England
- Denomination: Church of England
- Churchmanship: Broad Church

History
- Dedication: St. Philip
- Events: D

Architecture
- Architect: Richard Charles Sutton
- Groundbreaking: 26 May 1876
- Completed: 1879
- Construction cost: £7,750
- Demolished: 1963

Specifications
- Capacity: 616

Administration
- Province: York
- Diocese: Diocese of Southwell
- Parish: Nottingham

St. Philip's Church, Nottingham, was a Church of England church in Nottingham on Pennyfoot Street between 1879 and 1963.

== History ==
St. Philip's Church was created out of the parish of St. Luke's Church, Nottingham. It was designed by Richard Charles Sutton as a memorial to Thomas Adams, the Lace Manufacturer.

In May 1876 the promoters of the church made an application to the Incorporated Church Building Society for a contribution to the construction costs. It was built in the 14th-century Gothic style, with 616 seats and the cost of building was £7,750 (equivalent to £773,170 in 2025). The church comprised a nave with side aisles, organ chamber, vestry and semi-circular chancel. It was lit by triplicated lights in the clerestory, and coupled lancet lights in the aisles. the caps on the piers were carved and traceried lancet lights inserted at the end of the chancel. The pavement in the chancel was laid with encaustic tiles. The roofs were open-timbered and stained. It was built of Mansfield stone with a wrought dressing. The builder was Charles Lowe, and the plumber was Mr. Hardisty. The church was consecrated on 18 November 1879 by the Bishop of Lincoln, Rt. Revd Christopher Wordsworth.

In 1924, St. Luke's and St. Philip's became a united benefice. St. Luke's was demolished but St. Philip's survived until 1963, when it too was demolished. The congregation moved to St. Christopher's Church, Sneinton.

== Vicars ==
- James Wheeler 1878–1897 (afterwards rector of Hampreston, Dorset)
- George Martin 1898–1902
- Matthew A. Dodds 1902–1914 (afterwards vicar of Chilvers Coton, Nuneaton)
- John Goulton 1914–1959

== Organists ==
- J. Gordon Wood 1913–1922 (afterwards organist of St Stephen's Church, Hyson Green)
- Harry Lee ca. 1930 ca. 1941
- Hugh Wayman until 1963

== Closure ==
The church was demolished in 1963.
