= Henry Lawson (astronomer) =

English astronomer

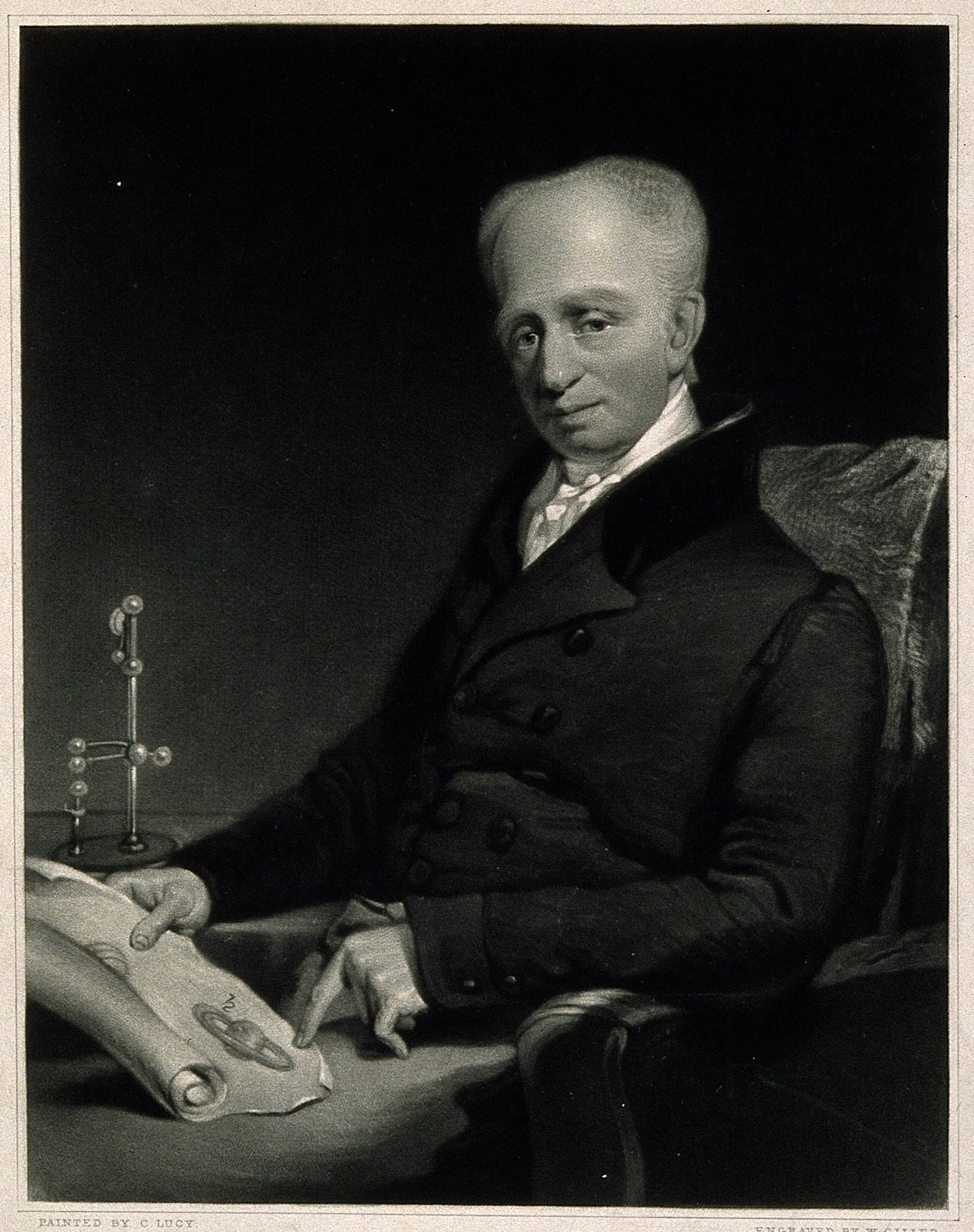
- Born: 1774
- Died: 1855 (aged 80–81)
- Scientific career
- Fields: astronomy

Henry Lawson (1774–1855) was an English astronomer, member of the Royal Astronomical Society, the Royal Society, and the British Meteorological Society, as well as an inventor, designer, science educator, and philanthropist. He observed an occultation of Saturn on 8 May 1832, Johann Gottfried Galle's first comet in December 1839 and January 1840, and recorded the falling stars of 12–13 November 1841. He claimed to have been related to Catherine Parr.

== Life ==
He was the second son of Johnson Lawson, dean of Battle, Sussex, and Elizabeth, daughter of Henry Wright of Bath, Somerset, he was born at Greenwich on 23 March 1774. He was a pupil of Charles Burney, and then entered as an apprentice the optical establishment of his stepfather Edward Nairne of Cornhill. Subsequently, he did not go into in business, but concentrated on scientific study. He had been apprenticed through and, like Nairne, became a Freeman of the Worshipful Company of Spectacle Makers. He became Master of the Company in 1803-04 and 1822–23. He was responsible for redesigning the company's unofficial arms in 1810, incorporating scientific instruments as well as spectacles.

Living in Hereford after his 1823 marriage, he equipped an observatory with a five-foot refractor in 1826, and with one of eleven feet in 1834, made by George Dollond. A relative having left him a fortune, he moved to Bath in 1841, and mounted his instruments on the roof of his house at No. 7 Lansdown Crescent.

Lawson devoted time to promoting science for young people, and dispensing charity. He died at Bath in his eighty-second year, a few weeks after his wife, on 22 August 1855, and was buried at Weston.

== Legacy ==
The last of his line of the family, Lawson bequeathed to Agnes Strickland relics of his supposed ancestress Catherine Parr. His large fortune was divided by will among 139 persons, and some charitable institutions. Lawson became a member of the Royal Astronomical Society in 1833, of the Royal Society in 1840, and of the British Meteorological Society in 1850, and left money to each of those bodies.

Lawson had offered in December 1851 his astronomical apparatus, with 1000 guineas, to the town of Nottingham, on condition of money enough being raised to build and endow an observatory. The plan failed after disputes about the valuation of the instruments. His eleven-foot telescope was later presented to the Royal Hospital School at Greenwich, the five-foot to William Garrow Lettsom, and his meteorological appliances to Edward Joseph Lowe.

== Works ==
Lawson observed an occultation of Saturn on 8 May 1832, Johann Gottfried Galle's first comet in December 1839 and January 1840, and recorded the falling stars of 12–13 November 1841. He published in 1844 a paper On the Arrangement of an Observatory for Practical Astronomy and Meteorology, and in 1847 a brief History of the New Planets.

The Society of Arts, of which he was a member, voted Lawson a silver medal for the invention of an observing-chair called "Reclinea", and awarded him a prize for a new thermometer-stand, described before the British Association in 1845. He made communications to the British Association in 1846 and 1847 on solar telescopic work, and published in 1853 accounts of his designs for a "lifting apparatus" for invalids, and of a "surgical transferrer".

== Family ==
Lawson lived with his mother until her death in 1823, when he married Amelia, daughter of Thomas Jennings, vicar of St. Peter's, Hereford.

== Notes ==
Attribution

This article incorporates text from a publication now in the public domain: Lee, Sidney, ed. (1892). "Lawson, Henry". Dictionary of National Biography. Vol. 32. London: Smith, Elder & Co.
