= Nottingham Harmonic Society =

Nottingham Harmonic Society is Nottingham's civic choir, and has established itself as one of the leading provincial choruses in Britain.

It started life as the Vocal Music Club of the Nottingham Mechanics' Institution under the direction of Alfred Joseph Lowe formed in 1846, but soon became independent of the Institute under the name Nottingham Sacred Harmonic Society.

== List of Chorus Masters ==
- Henry Farmer 1866 - 1880
- John Adcock 1880 - 1895
- Henry Wood 1897 - 1902
- Allen Gill 1902 - 1930
- Roy Henderson 1930 - 1937
- Herbert Bardgett 1937 - 1960
- Noel Cox 1960 - 1973
- Andrew Burnham 1973 - 1985
- Neil Page 1986 - 2007
- Murray Stewart 2007 - 2008
- Richard Laing 2009 - current
