= Nottingham Mechanics' Institution =

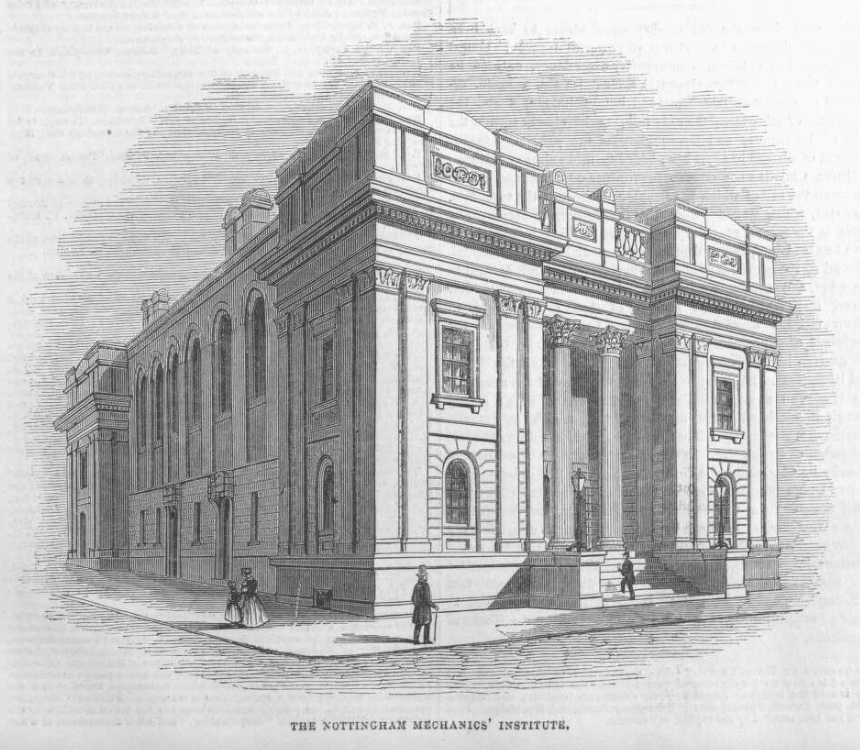
- Building of 1844 from the Illustrated London News of 9 March 1844

- Location within Nottinghamshire

General information
- Location: Nottingham, England
- Coordinates: 52.95658°N 1.14895°W
- Completed: 1845
- Renovated: 1869
- Demolished: 2005

The Nottingham Mechanics' Institution was founded in 1837 in Nottingham to improve the knowledge of working men with classes and lectures, the provision of libraries, performances of music, drama and readings, and through social contact with a good cross-section of the better educated members of the community with the aim:

TO PROMOTE THE BENEFIT OF THE INHABITANTS OF THE CITY OF NOTTINGHAM AND THE NEIGHBOURHOOD AREAS THEREOF BY THE ADVANCEMENT OF EDUCATION AND THE PROVISION, IN THE INTERESTS OF SOCIAL WELFARE AND WITH THE OBJECT OF IMPROVING CONDITIONS OF LIFE, OF FACILITIES FOR RECREATION AND OTHER LEISURE-TIME OCCUPATION.

They are an educational charity still based in the City.

== History ==
In 1837, John Smith Wright of the Nottingham banking family, decided to form the Mechanics' Institute, modelled on the institutes which were becoming commonplace in other locations in the country.

In October 1837 a meeting was held in the Town Hall at Weekday Cross at which 490 supporters put their names towards the scheme.

The Institute rented premises at 17 St. James's Street from 1837 to 1845. The committee appointed John Porchett as the Librarian at a yearly salary of 12 guineas (equivalent to £1,220 in 2025). One of the first attractions of membership was free admission to body dissections at Nottingham General Hospital.

In 1840, the Institution held the first ever art exhibition in Nottingham which in just 5 months attracted 224,000 visitors. The receipts from admission charges was £2,996 (equivalent to £263,886 in 2025).

=== Move to Milton Street ===
On 28 January 1845, the Institution opened its own Mechanics' Hall on Milton Street. The architects of the building were Robert Jalland and Thomas Hawksley of Middle Pavement. By this stage the library of the Institution contained some 40,000 volumes.

Charles Dickens appeared at the Mechanics' Institute on 21 October 1858 and read his Christmas Carol.

=== Fire of 1867 ===
A fire on 14 March 1867 caused much damage, including the loss of the organ which had been installed in 1847. The Institute claimed £3,950 (equivalent to £382,361 in 2025) on the insurance. £2,200 (equivalent to £212,961 in 2025) was paid off the mortgage on the building, and a public appeal raised £2,579 (equivalent to £249,648 in 2025).

=== New building of 1869 ===
A new hall with double the seating capacity of the old hall was designed by Thomas Simpson and opened on 19 January 1869.

In 1912 the adjacent Mansfield Road Baptist Church was purchased and converted into a lecture hall.

=== Birkbeck House 1964 ===
In 1964 the Mechanics' Institution decided to redevelop the building on the same site. The new building was called Birkbeck House and cost around £750,000 (equivalent to £13,282,032 in 2025). The Mechanics' used the first floor and rented out the rest of the building to tenants. At the opening in April 1966 the Mechanics was described thus: "It has survived because it has adapted itself to changing circumstances in this modern age and has at the same time preserved all the best traditions of the past".

Facilities provided included: the Members' Lounge, Restaurant, Buttery (Members' Bar), Library & Quiet Room, Billiard Room, Card Room, Chess Room and Activities Room.

=== North Sherwood Street 2003 ===
In 2003 the Mechanics' Institution moved again to a new home on North Sherwood Street, and Birkbeck House was demolished and the site used for retail and housing.

== Pipe organ ==
A specification of the pipe organ, built by Henry Bevington, can be found on the National Pipe Organ Register.

== Successor organisations ==
Many of Nottingham's institutions had their origins in the Mechanics' Institute, including University College which later became the University of Nottingham, the Wollaton Hall Natural History Museum, the Operatic Society, The Photographic Society, the Nottingham Harmonic Society, and other clubs for cycling, rambling, gymnastics and chess.
