= St Ann's Church, Nottingham =

St. Ann's Church, Nottingham
- St. Ann's Church, Nottingham
- 52°57′34″N 1°8′27″W
- Country: England
- Denomination: Church of England
- Churchmanship: Broad Church

History
- Dedication: St. Ann

Architecture
- Architect: Robert Clarke
- Completed: 1864
- Demolished: 1971

Administration
- Province: York
- Diocese: Diocese of Southwell
- Parish: St Ann's, Nottingham

St. Ann's Church, St. Ann's Well Road was a Church of England church in Nottingham on St. Ann's Well Road between 1864 and 1971.

== History ==
It was created out of the parish of St. Mary's Church, Nottingham through the impetus of the vicar of St. Mary's, Joshua William Brooks. The trustees of the new church were Thomas Adams, lace manufacturer, Frances Butcher Gill, a philanthropic silk merchant, Robert Holden of Nuthall, Revd. Edmund Holland of Saxmundham, Revd. Charles Bridges.

The foundation stone was laid on the 23 September 1863 by Sydney Pierrepont, 3rd Earl Manvers. The church was consecrated on 26 September 1864.

The first incumbent was Henry Jemson Tebbutt. He planned and built the daughter church of St. Andrew's Church, Mansfield Road, which he moved to as first incumbent when it opened in 1870.

The second incumbent was James Dawson Lewis, a Cambridge scholar. During his thirty-year incumbency the church was enlarged five times, and the school rooms enlarged fifteen times. He earned the nickname the "running parson" as he ran to meet people in trouble. He opened two daughter churches, St. Jude's Church, Mapperley, and Emmanuel Church, Woodborough Road.

St. Bartholomew's Church, Nottingham was formed out of this parish in 1902.

== Closure ==
The church was demolished in 1971 as part of the re-development of the St. Ann's area and the parish combined with Emmanuel Church to form a new church of St. Ann with Emmanuel, Nottingham.

== Former burial records ==
After the closure of the church many of the head stones were removed and taken to their current location. The following records are of the current stones that remain in the rest garden off Bath Street.

ALLINSON, Georgiana / HARRINGTON, Elizabeth / GARROWAY, Harriett / MELLWOOD, Caroline / ALLMAN, George / ALMOND, ? / DASOTT, Sarah / ALPORT, Margaret / SIMKINS, Esther / ALLWRIGHT, Unus / HACKMAN, Hannah / SALLUM, Henry
