= Evan Owen =

Evan Owen may refer to:

- Evan Owen (Allen) (1805–1852), Welsh writer and poet
- Evan Owen Williams (1890–1969), British engineer and architect
- Evan Owen Phillips (1826–1897), Welsh Anglican priest
