= Daily Express Building =

Daily Express Building is the name used to refer to a series of art-deco buildings commissioned by Beaverbrook Associated Newspapers in the 1930s to house the three offices of the Daily Express newspaper:

- Daily Express Building, London (1932) - designed by Ellis & Clarke. Lavishly decorated interior, now Grade II*
- Daily Express Building, Glasgow (1937) - designed by Ellis & Clarke.
- Daily Express Building, Manchester (1939) - designed by Sir Owen Williams. Incorporates a futuristic facade, now Grade II*
