= Listed buildings in Beeston, Nottinghamshire =

Beeston is a town in the Borough of Broxtowe, Nottinghamshire, England. The town contains 25 listed buildings that are recorded in the National Heritage List for England. Of these, two are listed at Grade I, the highest of the three grades, and the others are at Grade II, the lowest grade. In the town is Boots Factory Site, which contains three listed buildings, two of which are listed at Grade I. Most of the other listed buildings are houses and associated structures, and the rest include a church, a village cross, two bridges, a public house, a railway station, former mills and three war memorials.

== Key ==
Grade	Criteria
I	Buildings of exceptional interest, sometimes considered to be internationally important
II	Buildings of national importance and special interest

== Buildings ==
Name and location	Photograph	Date	Notes	Grade
Village cross 52.92556°N 1.21574°W		14th century	The cross was moved to its present site in about 1860. It is in dressed stone, and has a square base and a tapered square shaft about 3 feet (0.91 m) high.	II
St John the Baptist Church; 52.92552°N 1.21657°W		15th century	The oldest part of the church is the chancel, the rest of the church was rebuilt in 1842–44 by Scott and Moffatt, the organ chamber was added in 1876, and the church was reordered in 2005–06. The church is built in stone with roofs of slate and tile, and it consists of a nave with a clerestory, north and south aisles, a north transept, a chancel with vestries, and a southwest tower. The tower has four stages, buttresses, a higher octagonal stair turret at the southwest, three string courses, and an arched west doorway with a moulded surround. The second and third stages contain lancet windows, and in the top stage are double lancet bell openings; all the openings have hood moulds. At the top is an embattled parapet, and there is also an embattled parapet on the chancel.	II
Manor House, wall and wash house 52.92444°N 1.21475°W		c. 1675	The house, which was altered and extended in the 19th century, is in brick, partly rendered and colourwashed, on a chamfered stone plinth, with some diapering, and a tile roof with coped gables and kneelers, the south gable large and shaped. There are two storeys and attics, an L-shaped plan and a main range of four bays. The windows are casements, some with segmental heads, and some with Gothick glazing. To the east of the house is a boundary wall containing a doorway with segmental head, and adjacent is a wash house containing a Gothick opening.	II
West End House; 52.92361°N 1.21677°W		Mid 17th century	The house has a timber framed core with walls in brick and stone, rendered and colourwashed, on a rendered stone plinth, with slate roofs and coped gables. There are two storeys and attics, two bays, and a gabled cross-wing on the right. On the front is a porch with hipped roof, a doorway with a fanlight, and a canted bay window. Most of the windows are casements, and at the rear is a gabled stair turret.	II
Old Manor House; 52.92343°N 1.21622°W		Late 17th century	A farmhouse, later a private house, which has been extended and altered. It is in colourwashed rendered brick on a plinth, with floor bands, and a tile roof with shouldered coped gables. There are two storeys and attics, and an L-shaped plan with a front range of three bays, and a gabled rear wing with further extensions. On the front is a timber framed Tudor-style porch and a mix of sash and casement windows. At the rear is a French window and two doorways with fanlights.	II
The Old Cottage; 52.92400°N 1.21651°W	—	Late 17th century	The house is rendered and colourwashed, and has a roof of tile and slate with shouldered coped gables. There are two storeys, and an L-shaped plan with eight unequal bays, and a rear wing and extensions. The doorway has a reeded surround, the windows are a mix of sashes and casements, and there is a flat-roofed bay window and a circular window.	II
Meadow Road Bridge; 52.91584°N 1.19678°W		c. 1792	The bridge carries a road over the Beeston Cut. It is in brick, partly rendered, with a stone soffit and parapet, and consists of a single stilted asymmetrical arch over the canal and towpath. The parapet is curved, it has gabled coping, and four chamfered square piers.	II
Towpath footbridge 52.91172°N 1.21267°W		c. 1792	The bridge carries a footpath, originally the towpath along the River Trent, over a waterway. It is in stone and has a chamfered square opening and a chamfered sill band. On the south side is a steel floodgate.	II
42 Broadgate; 52.93104°N 1.20768°W		1820	The house is in stuccoed brick with a slate roof, two storeys and three bays. In the centre is a porch with a pediment, and a round-headed doorway with an elaborate surround. The windows are sashes with Tudor-style hood moulds.	II
The Grange; 52.92485°N 1.21729°W		c. 1820	The house, at one time a police station, is in colourwashed brick on a stone plinth, with a floor band, panelled eaves, a parapet, and a hipped slate roof. There are two storeys and attics, and six bays, the left bay recessed, and the right bay projecting. The doorway has a reeded surround with a fanlight and a palmette keystone. The windows are sashes, and at the rear is a two-storey canted bay window.	II
Dagfa House School; 52.93231°N 1.20785°W	—	Early 19th century	A house later used as a school, in colourwashed stuccoed brick on stone plinth, with deep eaves and slate roofs. There are two storeys and attics, and an irregular T-shaped plan, with fronts of three and five bays. On the garden front is a two-storey gabled wing containing a latticed verandah with a hipped roof in one angle, and a two-storey square turret in the other. The east front has a wing with a full-width gabled bay window, and in the angle is a porch with a doorway and fanlight. Most of the windows are casements with Gothick glazing.	II
The Crown Inn and stables 52.92482°N 1.21575°W		Early 19th century	The public house is in colourwashed pebbledashed brick on a rendered plinth, with a roof of tile, slate and pantile. There are two storeys and a double depth L-shaped plan with a front range of five bays. On the front are two doorways, one with a fanlight and a carriage entrance, and a mix of sash and casement windows. The stables contain casement windows, stable doors and a hatch.	II
The Elms and pump 52.92392°N 1.21698°W	—	Early 19th century	The house is in roughcast brick on a rendered plinth with a hipped slate roof. There are two storeys, three bays, and a square plan. In the centre is a porch with square piers, a cornice and a parapet, on the side is a two-storey canted bay window, and most of the other windows are sashes. In an angle is a timber-cased lead pump with stone trough.	II
Stables, The Elms; 52.92398°N 1.21684°W	—	Early 19th century	The stables are in brick with a pantile roof. They have one and two storeys, eight unequal bays, and a lean-to. The windows are a mix of casements and horizontally-sliding sashes, and the openings have elliptical heads.	II
Stables, Old Manor House; 52.92363°N 1.21619°W	—	c. 1830	The stables are in brick with cogged eaves, and a slate roof with coped gables. There are two storeys and seven unequal bays. The stables contain single and carriage doorways, a pitching hole, and windows that are a mix of casements and horizontally-sliding sashes. The doorways and most of the windows have segmental heads.	II
Broadgate House; 52.93164°N 1.20662°W		c. 1840	A house that was enlarged in about 1855 and later used for other purposes, it is in painted stuccoed brick on a rendered plinth, with a moulded cornice and parapet, a slate roof, and two storeys. On the west front is a blocked doorway and to its right is a two-storey canted bay window. The other windows are sashes, and on the right return is a three-storey square tower, built as an observatory, and containing a doorway with a flat hood on brackets.	II
Beeston railway station 52.92089°N 1.20750°W		1847	The station was built by the Midland Railway, and additions were late in the late 19th century. The main building is in white brick, partly stuccoed, with stone dressings, quoins, and a slate roof with bargeboards, some plain and some decorated, and finials. There is a single storey and attics, and the plan consists of a central block, with gables at each end and lower gabled wings. The windows are cross windows with lozenge glazing. On the platform side is a four-bay ridge-and furrow canopy on decorative iron columns with corbels springing to pierced spandrels. On each platform is a shelter divided into bays by wooden partitions with a valence and containing benches.	II
Crimean War Memorial; 52.92535°N 1.21604°W		1857	The war memorial is in the churchyard of St John the Baptist Church. It is in stone and has a square plinth and base with a moulded top edge, on which is a textured obelisk on a square corniced base. On the base are four marble tablets with inscriptions, and the names of those lost in the Crimean War.	II
Factory, printing room, waiting room and gateway, Anglo Scotian Mills; 52.92949°N 1.21658°W		1886	The buildings are in red brick with stone and white brick dressings, chamfered dentilled eaves, embattled towers, and roofs of slate, asbestos, felt and tile. They form an irregular L-shaped plan, and have between one and three storeys, fronts of ten and three bays, and a central stepped gable with a clock and a cross finial. The windows are casements with pointed or segmental heads. The gateway is flanked by octagonal piers with chamfered plinths, bands, crosslets and parapets, and between them is a pair of ornate wrought iron gates. To the left is a single-storey waiting room with four bays, four pointed openings, and an embattled parapet.	II
Main block, Anglo Scotian Mills; 52.92910°N 1.21759°W		1892	The former lace making factory is in red brick with some white and blue brick, on a chamfered plinth, with stone dressings, floor bands, crosses in buff brick, an embattled parapet, and a slate roof. There are four storeys and twelve bays, with embattled octagonal towers at the corners and flanking the middle two bays, over which is a crowstepped gable and a cross finial. In the centre is an arched entrance with a keystone, and the windows are casements with moulded surrounds and arched heads. At the rear are single-storey extensions and a water tower with a dentilled cornice.	II
Boer War Memorial; 52.92851°N 1.21016°W		1903	The memorial commemorates those lost in the Second Boer War, and was moved to its present site in Broadgate Park in about 1916. It was designed by Arthur George Marshall and is in stone. It consists of a statue depicting a female figure known as Hope, standing on a stepped base on a lobed column. On the front of the column is an inscribed tablet with a wreath.	II
War Memorial Cross; 52.92436°N 1.21532°W		c. 1920	The war memorial stands by a road junction, and is in Portland stone. It consists of a Celtic cross on a panelled tapered square shaft, on a square plinth with recessed panels. This stands on an octagonal base of three steps, the top step decorated and with an iron railing. The panels on the plinth have inscriptions.	II
Building D10, Boots Factory Site; 52.92414°N 1.19235°W		1931–32	The building was designed by Owen Williams in Modernist style. It is in reinforced concrete, with canted octagonal mushroom columns carrying continuous reinforced-concrete floor slabs, and the building is surrounded by continuous glazed curtain walls. There are four storeys and a part basement, and a rectangular plan with cantilevered loading bays. In the centre is a full-height atrium with four lightwells.	I
Building D6, Boots Factory Site; 52.92563°N 1.19375°W		1935–38	The building was designed by Owen Williams in Modernist style. It is in reinforced concrete with a rectangular plan, and is mainly in a single storey with sections of five and six storeys. Features include a six-storey canted lift and stair tower, a cantilevered canopy over the car park, and two projecting hoist towers.	I
Building D34, Boots Factory Site; 52.92571°N 1.19617°W	—	1938	The building is a fire station designed by Owen Williams. It has a reinforced concrete external frame with cantilever beams on a concrete plinth, and concrete roofs. There is a rectangular plan, with sides of eight and three bays. In the centre is a taller appliance house with clerestory windows, flanked by single-storey extensions with parapets. The front entrance has full height doors, and the tower has glass brick infill.	II
