= Boots Factory Site =

Industrial site in Nottinghamshire, England

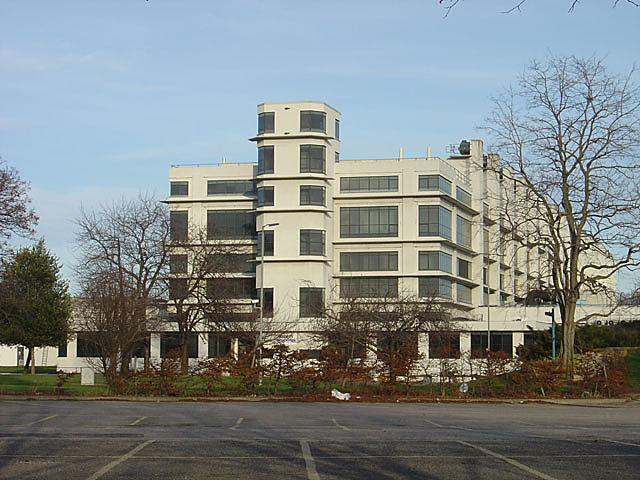
- The building in 2008

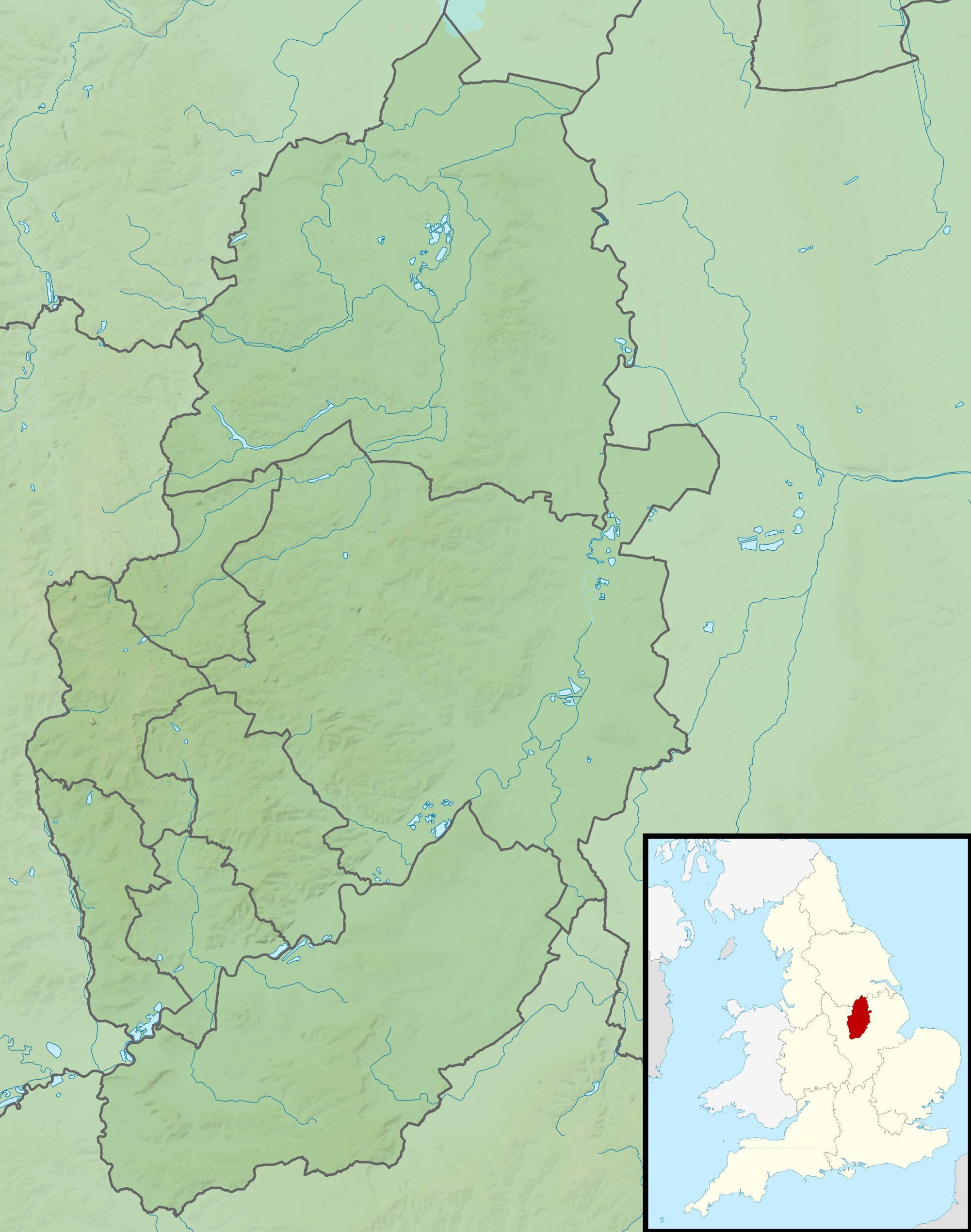
- Location within Nottinghamshire
- 52.9241°N 1.1923°W
- Type: Industrial site
- Location: Beeston, Nottinghamshire, England

History
- Built: 1926 onwards

Site notes
- Architect(s): Owen Williams; Skidmore, Owings & Merrill
- Architectural style: Modernist
- Owner: Boots UK Limited

Listed Building – Grade I
- Official name: Building D10 at Boots Factory Site
- Designated: 28 January 1971
- Reference no.: 1247927

Listed Building – Grade I
- Official name: Building D6 at Boots Factory Site
- Designated: 14 April 1987
- Reference no.: 1278028

Listed Building – Grade II*
- Official name: Boots D90 West Headquarters Building
- Designated: 28 August 1996
- Reference no.: 1268303

Listed Building – Grade II
- Official name: Building D34 (fire station) at Boots Factory Site
- Designated: 14 April 1987
- Reference no.: 1247933

Listed Building – Grade II
- Official name: Bust of Sir Jesse Boot (Lord Trent) at entrance to boating lake
- Designated: 30 November 1995
- Reference no.: 1255192

The Boots Factory Site at Beeston, Nottinghamshire, England, is the location for the headquarters of Boots UK Limited. The site was developed from 1926 as the manufacturing, packing and distribution centre for the pharmaceutical company developed by Jesse Boot. The site contains a number of significant buildings, including "some of the most important" examples of 20th-century Modernist design in Britain. The most important are the two designed by Owen Williams; the D10, 'Wets' building, and the D6, 'Drys' building. Both are Grade I listed buildings; D10 being the largest Grade I listed structure in Britain. The headquarters office, D90, was designed by Skidmore, Owings & Merrill and is designated a Grade II* listed building.

== History ==
John Boot (1815–1860) opened a shop selling herbal remedies in Goosegate in the City of Nottingham in 1849. Over the next 70 years his son, Jesse Boot, through a series of innovations; trading only in cash, the use of large-scale industrial production methodologies, the establishment of a major distribution and retailing network including the opening of over a thousand stores allowing direct selling, and the development of pharmacies which enabled him to undercut the prescription prices previously charged by doctors; expanded the business to become one of the world's biggest drug companies. In 1920 concerned as to whether his son, John had the commercial acumen necessary to run the company, Jesse Boot sold it to the United Drug Company of America. By 1926, John Boot had bought back the company and in 1927, renamed the Boots Pure Drug Company, it purchased a new 200-acre (81 ha) site at Beeston, outside of Nottingham, which became the Boots Factory Site.

Work began immediately and Owen Williams, an architect and engineer, was engaged to design a range of buildings on the site. The first was D10, the 'Wets' building, so-called because it was used for the manufacture and packaging of lotions and medicines in liquid form. This was constructed between 1930 and 1932 and was followed between 1935 and 1938 by D6, the 'Drys' building, used for production of tablets and lozenges. Williams went on to design a fire station, D34, for the plant. In the 1960s, the American firm Skidmore, Owings & Merrill was commissioned to design D90, the company headquarters, after Boots' executives had seen examples of their work in the United States.

The Beeston site remains the headquarters of Boots UK Limited in the 21st century, although the company is now owned by the American pharmacy chain Walgreens, through the Walgreens Boots Alliance. In April 2022, Walgreens put the UK business up for sale, before withdrawing it in June 2022. Parts of the site have been zoned for residential development.

== Architecture and description ==
In her 2020 revised edition of Nottinghamshire, in the Pevsner Buildings of England series, Clare Hartwell describes the collection of buildings at the Boots Factory Site as "some of the most important 20th-century work in Britain".

Building D10 is the largest Grade I listed structure in Britain. Its Historic England listing record describes it as "the most significant icon of British Modernism".

Building D6 is also a Grade I listed building.

The headquarters building, D90, is Grade II* listed.

Williams' fire station is listed at Grade II.

Jesse Boot is commemorated with a life-size bronze bust at the entrance to the boating lake in the park he donated as a civic amenity to his workers and to the people of Nottingham; it is also Grade II listed.

== Gallery ==
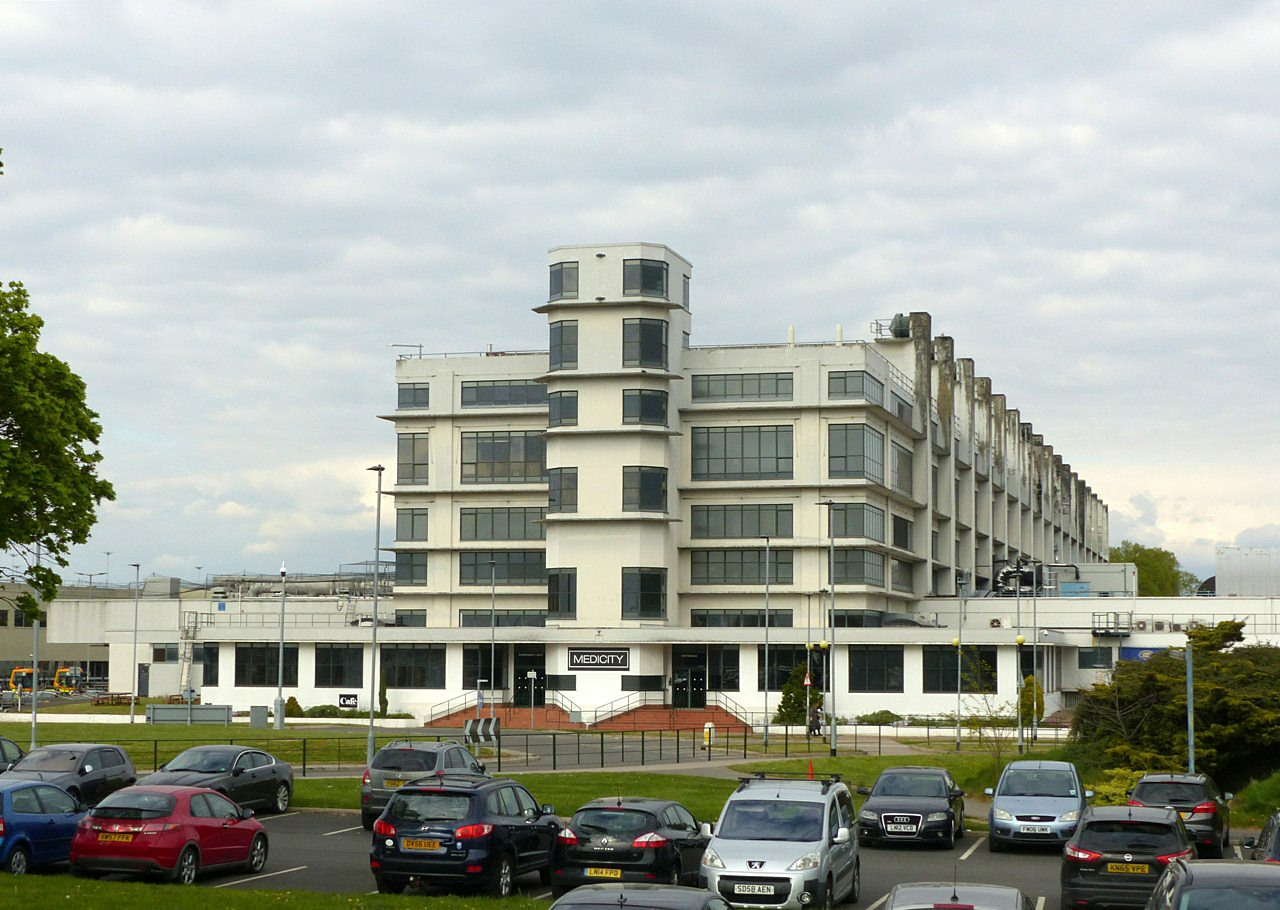
The D6 'Drys' building

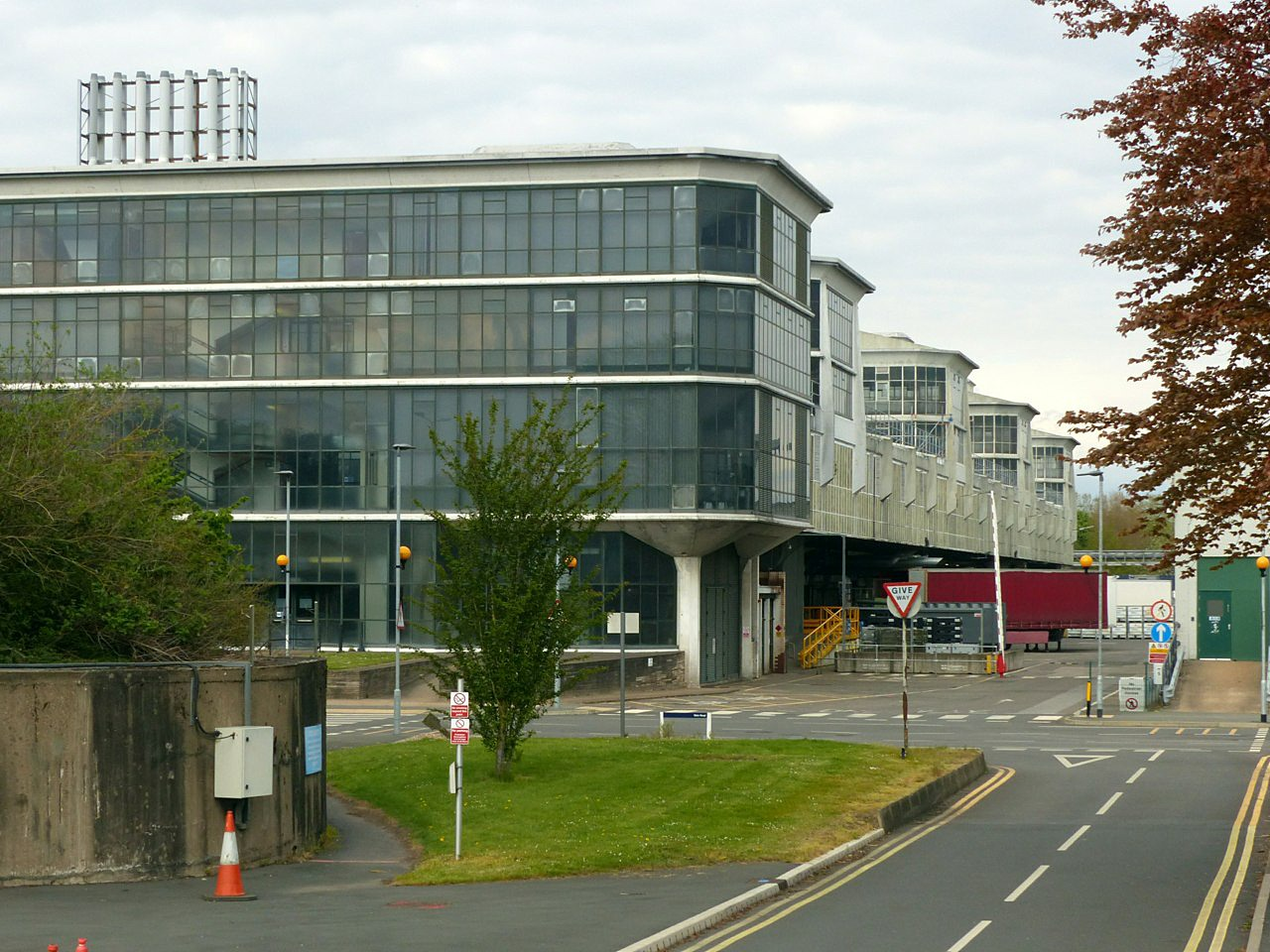
The D10 'Wets' building

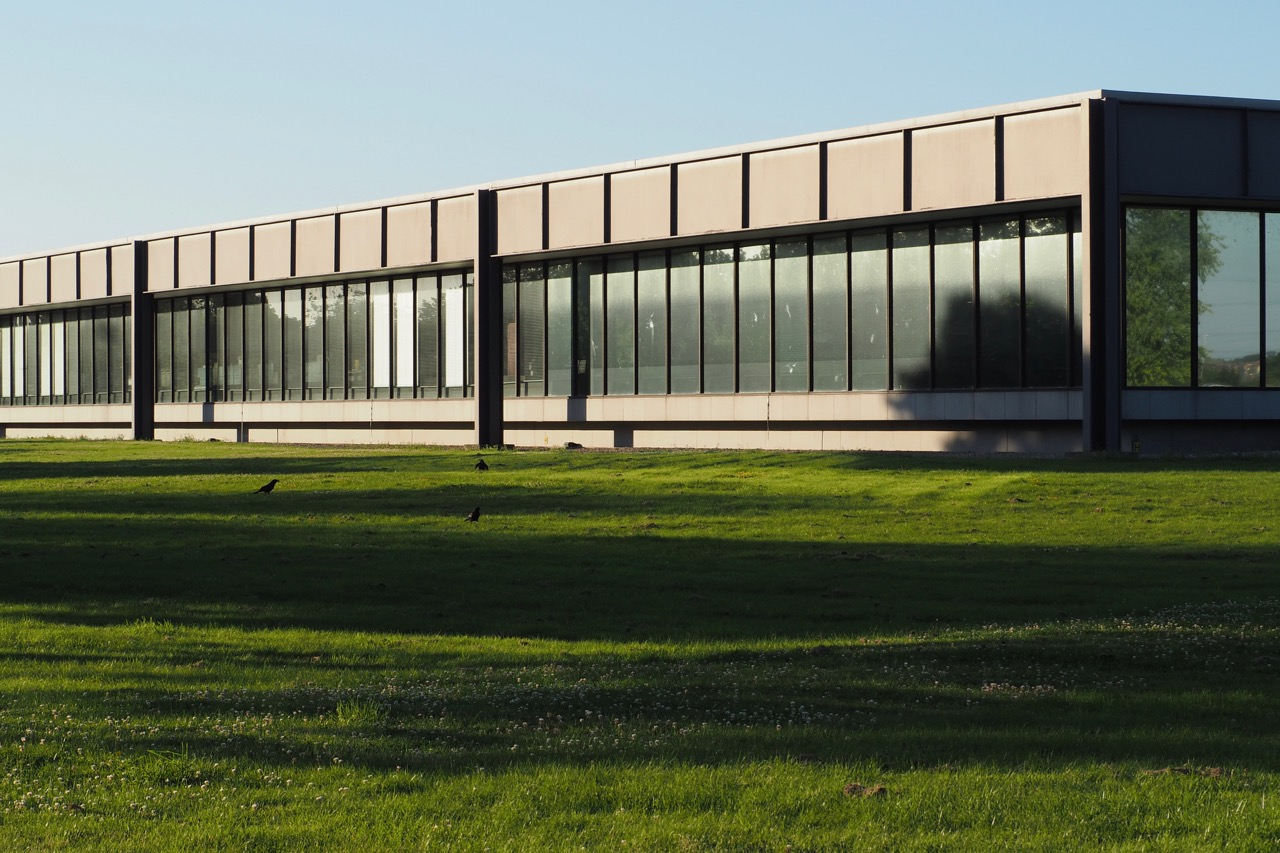
The D90 (West) headquarters building

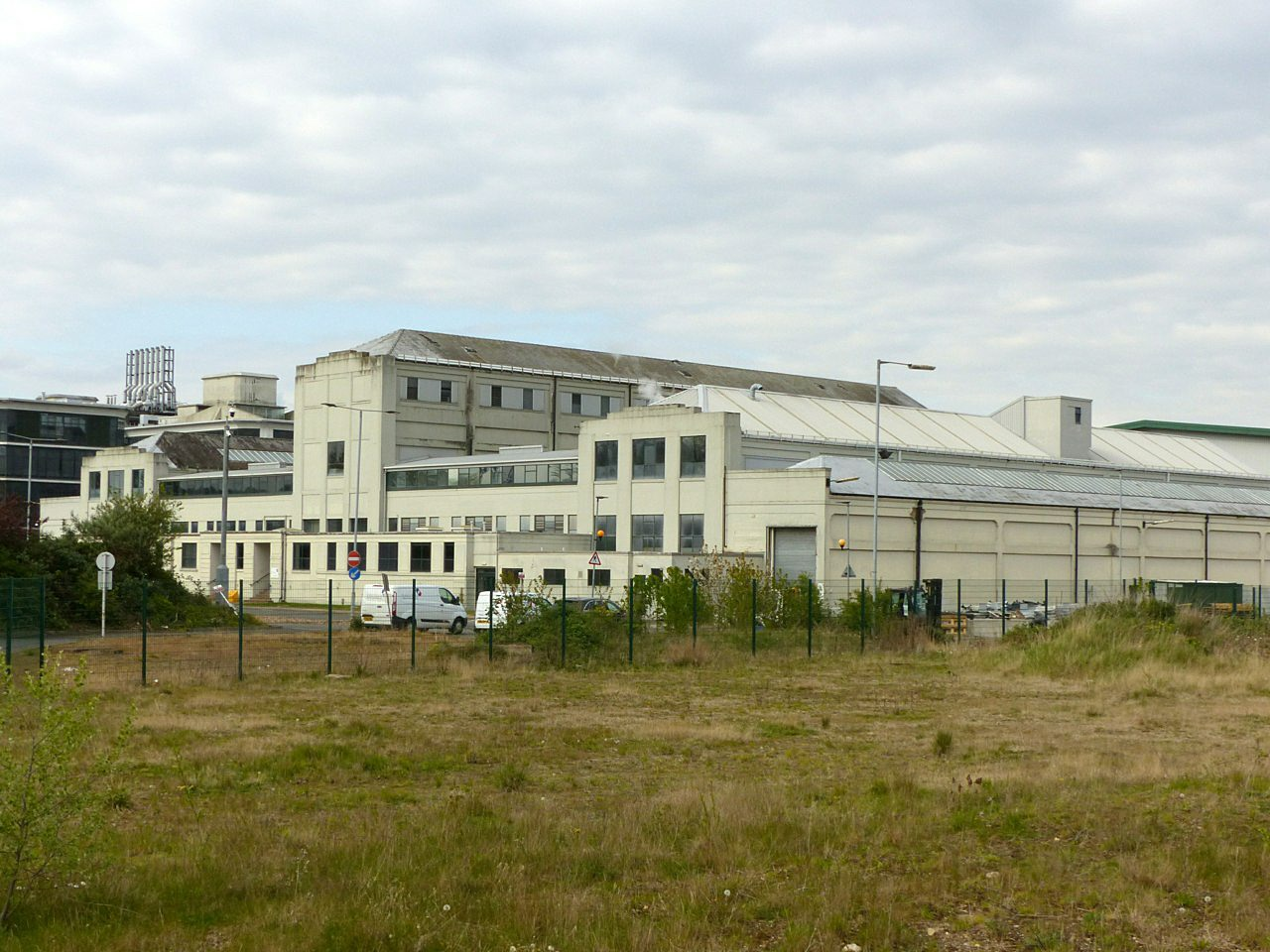
The D1 soap factory building

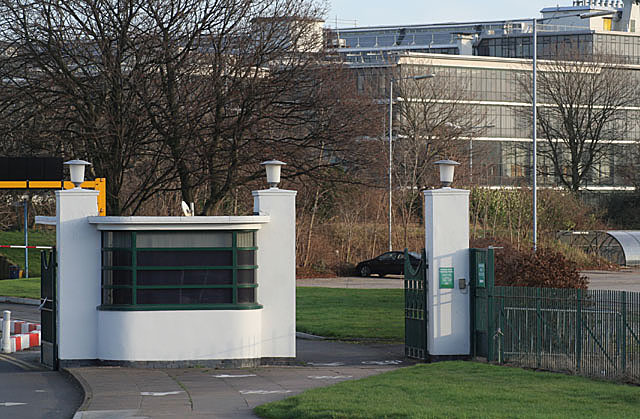
Entrance gate with the D10 building behind

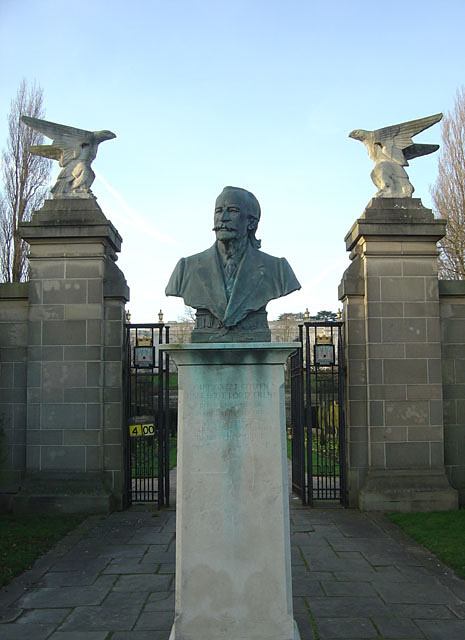
Bust of Jesse Boot at the entrance to the boating lake park

== See also ==
- Grade I listed buildings in Nottinghamshire
- Grade II* listed buildings in Nottinghamshire
- Listed buildings in Beeston, Nottinghamshire

== Sources ==
- Aslet, Clive (2005). Landmarks of Britain. London, UK: Hodder & Stoughton. ISBN 978-0-340-73510-7.
- Hartwell, Clare; Pevsner, Nikolaus; Williamson, Elizabeth (2020). Nottinghamshire. The Buildings Of England. New Haven, US and London: Yale University Press. ISBN 978-0-300-24783-1.
- Harwood, Elain (2010). Nottingham. Pevsner Architectural Guides. New Haven, US and London: Yale University Press. ISBN 978-0-300-12666-2.
