= Seren Gomer =

Welsh-language weekly newspaper

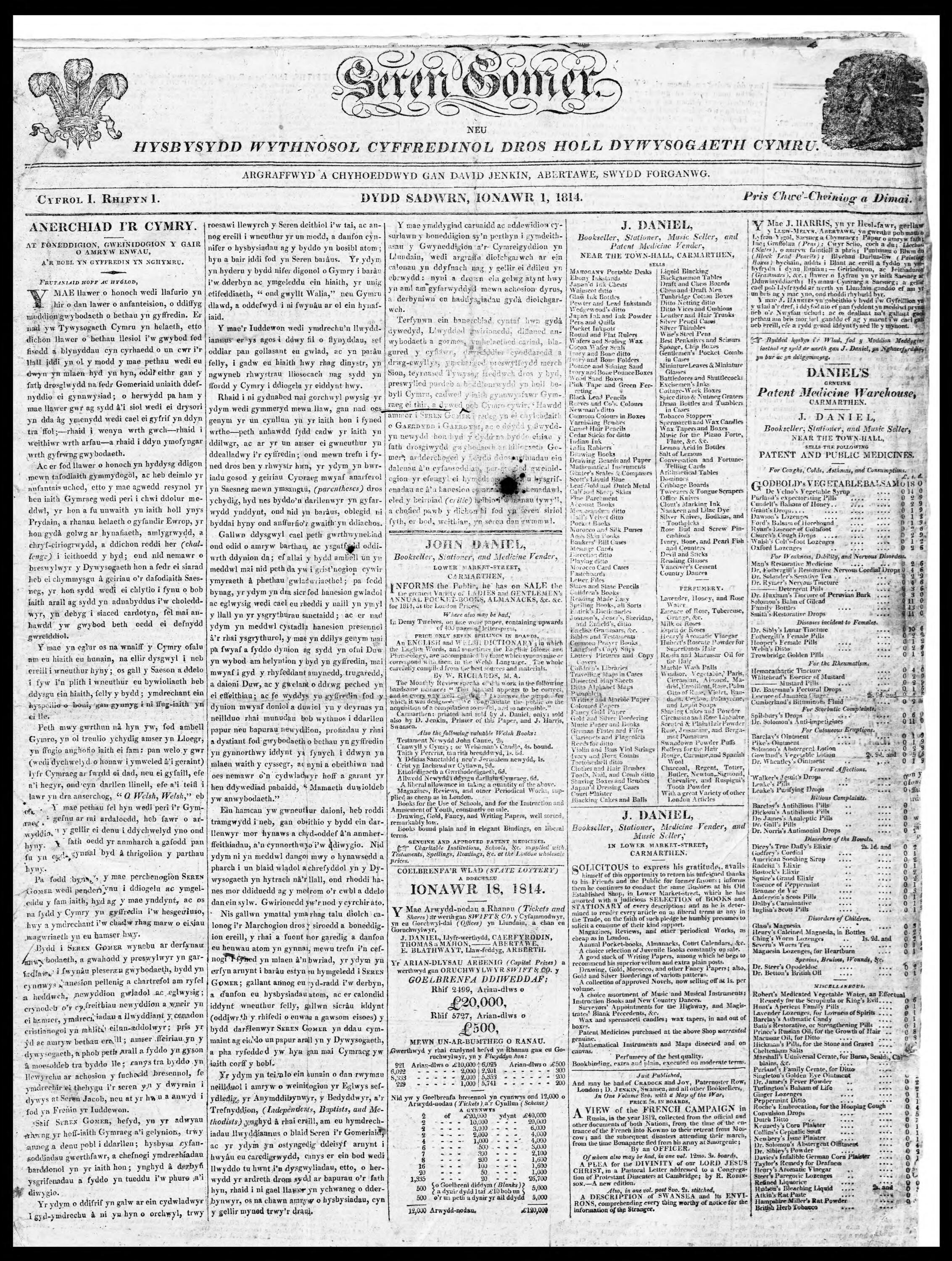
- Front page of the earliest surviving copy of Seren Gomer. January 1st, 1814
- Type: weekly newspaper, publishing house, printing company
- Founder: Joseph Harris
- Publisher: David Jenkin
- Editor: Samuel Evans[*], Joseph Harris, David Davies Evans[*]
- City: Swansea

Seren Gomer was the first Welsh-language weekly newspaper. The first number was published in 1814 in Swansea by the local Baptist minister and writer Joseph Harris (Gomer).

== Publishing history ==
The weekly was intended to cover news from the whole of Wales and from overseas, as well as literary material. Its success was limited: it went out of business in 1815 after 85 editions, partly due to the heavy tax on newspapers and a shortfall in advertising revenue. In 1818 Harris revived the publication, which became associated with the Baptist denomination. In 1820 it became a monthly. The writer and poet Evan Owen Allen was among its contributors.

When Harris died in 1825, the paper was purchased by Carmarthen publisher Hugh William Jones and became a quarterly Baptist magazine. This continued until 1983.

== Editors ==
1951–1975: Lewis Valentine
1975–1977: David Eirwyn Morgan
