= Joseph Harris (Gomer) =

Welsh Baptist minister, author, and journal editor

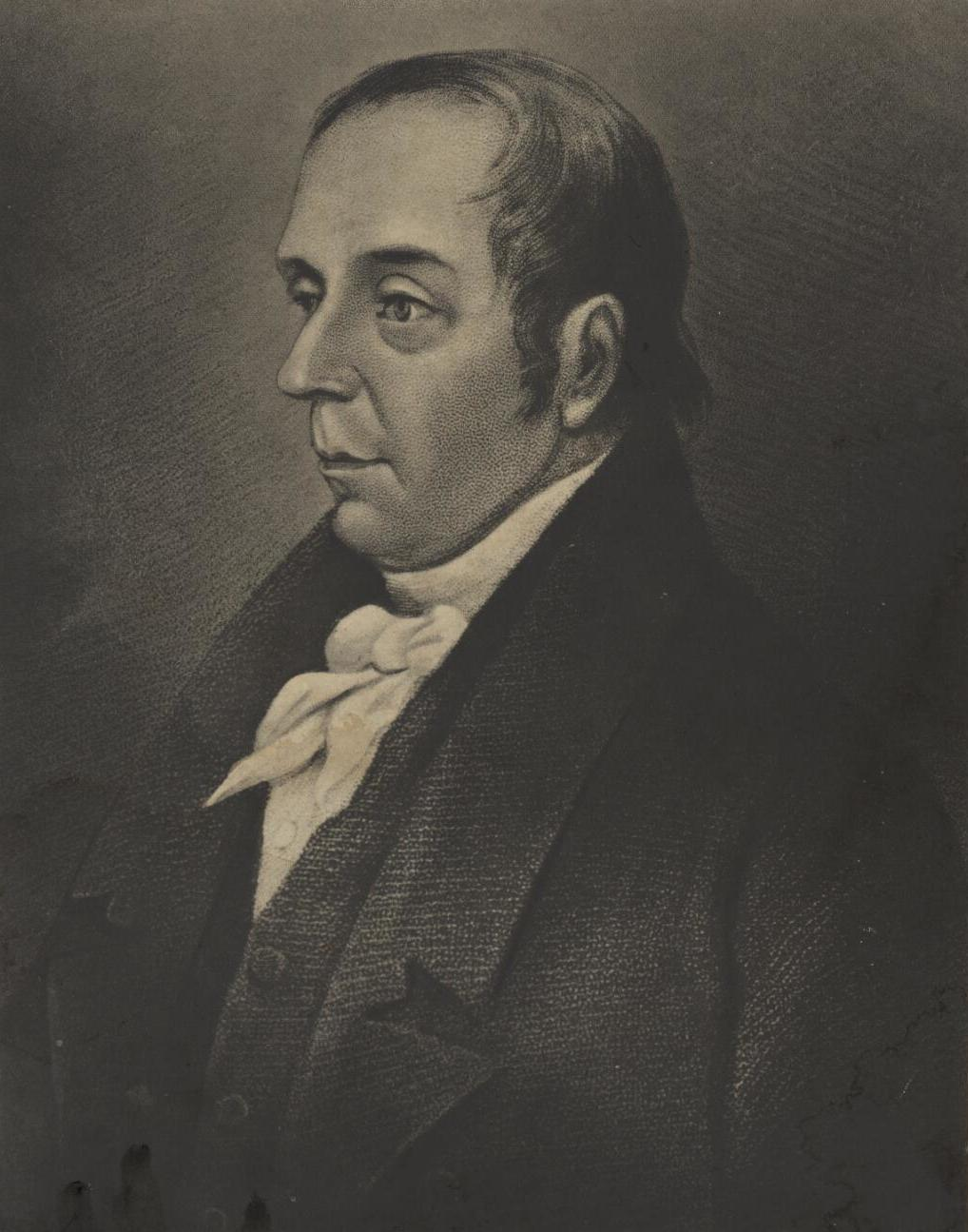
Portrait of Joseph Harris, 'Gomer' c.1860

Joseph Harris (1773 – 10 August 1825) was a Welsh Baptist minister, author, and journal editor. A Welsh language poet, he took the Biblical name of Gomer as his bardic name. On 1 January 1814 he launched the first Welsh-language weekly Seren Gomer ("Star of Gomer") in Swansea. Gomer was born on a farm in Wolf's Castle, Pembrokeshire, where a plaque was unveiled in his memory, making the 200th anniversary of the launch of Seren Gomer. Gomer himself became a preacher during the religious revival of 1795. He married Martha Symons, and took on Back Street chapel. One of his best-known works, Cofiant Ieuan Ddu, was a biography of his son, John Ryland Harris, who worked as a typesetter for his father's printing press and died at the age of twenty.

The name of the Gomer Press was almost certainly chosen because of its founder J.D. Lewis' high regard for Joseph Harris.

== Works ==
- Casgliad o Hymnau (1796)
- Yr Anghyffelyb Broffeswr (1802)
- Bwyall Grist yng Nghoed Anghrist (1804)
- Traethawd ar Briodol Dduwdod ein Harglwydd Iesu Grist (1816–17)
- Cofiant Ieuan Ddu

== See also ==
- Rhyd-y-groes (hymn tune)
