= James Price (civil engineer) =

Welsh civil engineer (1917–2005)

James Price MICE CEnv IntPE
- Born: 6 February 1917; Flint, Wales
- Died: 22 September 2005 (aged 88); Barry, Wales
- Education: University of Liverpool
- Spouse: Mary Eluned Williams
- Children: 4
- Engineering career
- Discipline: Civil engineering Infrastructure engineering Transportation engineering Engineering mathematics
- Institutions: Institution of Civil Engineers
- Projects: M1 motorway M3 motorway A30 road

James Price (6 February 1917 – 22 September 2005) was a Welsh civil engineer, mathematician, and writer. Price was the chief resident engineer on several large-scale engineering projects, including the M1 and M3 motorways.

== Education ==
Price's background was in engineering mathematics, in which he scored ninth overall in the UK summer higher exams of 1935. He received a Bachelor of Engineering degree following his graduation from the University of Liverpool in 1938, and joined the Institution of Civil Engineers in 1942 at the age of 25, following examinations he had taken pre-emptively in the summer of 1940. At the same time, he was recommended for promotion to assistant civil engineer (ACE). He received a Master of Engineering degree in 1942.

== Career ==
From 1956 to 1957, Price was employed by Nigerian Railways.

Price was chosen as the chief resident engineer on the first section of the M1 motorway in 1957, working with Sir Owen Williams and minister for transport Harold Watkinson. The road was opened by King Charles III, then Prince of Wales, on 2 November 1959

In the early 1960s, Price took up the position of senior resident engineer for the British electrical engineering consultancy engineers Merz & McLellan, who had started a scheme in the interest of reclaiming land owned by the London Brick Company in Peterborough which became known as the Peterborough Dust Disposal Scheme.

From 1967 to 31 December 1968, Price was the resident engineer for the Tilbury Grain Terminal, which was completed on schedule in 1968. From 1 January 1969, he served as chief resident engineer for the first phase of the M3 motorway in Surrey, followed by the second phase in 1974.

=== Memberships and honours ===
Price was a member of The Poetry Society, the Welsh Academy, the South and Mid-Wales Association of Writers, the Engineering Council, the Institution of Civil Engineers, and the Chartered Institution of Water and Environmental Management.

In 1997, Price received an Editors Choice Award from the National Library of Poetry (USA).

== Personal life ==
Price married Mary Eluned Williams on 27 May 1939. They had two sons (Newton and David) and two daughters (Linda and Christine).

== Works ==
=== Engineering ===
- 1951–1959 – M1 Motorway phase one
- 1956–1967 – M1 Motorway phase two
- 1961 – Peterborough Dust Disposal Scheme
- 1967–1968 – Tilbury Grain Terminal
- 1969–1974 – M3 Motorway phase one
- 1971 – A30 road
- 1974 – M3 Motorway phase two

=== Publications ===
- 1990 – Price's Progress: The Tortuous Journey of a Roving Civil Engineer
- 1994 – Passages in paradise
- Little Book of Poems
