= Rhyd-y-groes (hymn tune) =

Rhyd-y-groes or Rhydygroes is a popular Welsh Christian hymn tune composed by the American-born organist, conductor and composer Thomas David Edwards (1874-1930). Although Edwards wrote many compositions, Rhyd-y-groes, written in 1902 immediately before the Welsh Revival, remains the one for which he is best known.

The dramatic minor key tune is almost invariably used to set the text Duw mawr y rhyfeddodau maith, a Welsh translation, by Joseph Harris (Gomer), of Great God of wonders by the Presbyterian minister Samuel Davies. The English words are usually set to the hymn tune Huddersfield. Rhyd-y-groes is occasionally used to set other texts with an appropriate meter.

The hymn has been sung in Welsh communities in America, as well as those in Wales, but it has its greatest cultural resonance in the latter. In a 1960 House of Commons debate, the MP Sir Raymond Gower defined a "Welshman" as someone who on hearing the hymn (referred to by its refrain Pa dduw syn maddau fel Tydi) "would find a shiver going down his or her spine". The author Walter Haydn Davies (1903-1984) recorded that the miners of Bedlinog would always sing Duw mawr y rhyfeddodau maith when returning to the pit head.
