= Daily Express Building, Manchester =

Listed building in Manchester, England

Daily Express Building
- Express Building
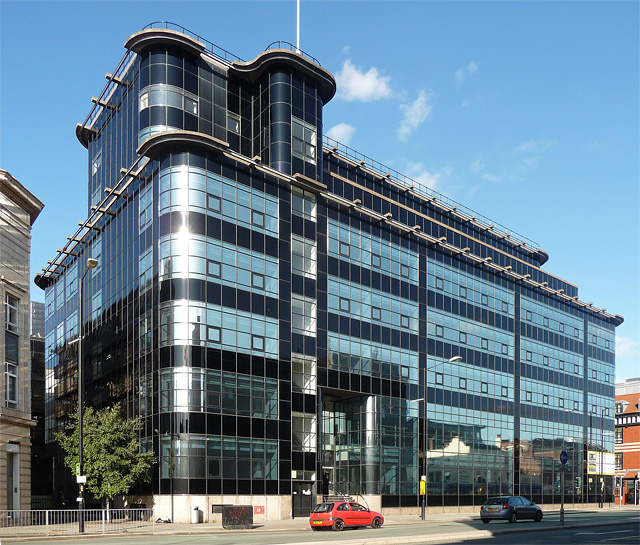
- Front façade visible from Great Ancoats Street

General information
- Type: Office and residential
- Architectural style: Futurist Art Deco; Streamline Moderne
- Location: Great Ancoats Street, Ancoats, Manchester, England
- Coordinates: 53.4849°N 2.2313°W
- Construction started: 1936
- Completed: 1939
- Renovated: 1960 (extension); 1979 (two-storey extension); 1983; 1993–95 (office conversion); 2018

Dimensions
- Diameter: 75,600 square feet (7,020 m^{2})

Technical details
- Structural system: Steel and glass (curtain wall)
- Floor count: 6

Design and construction
- Architect: Sir Owen Williams
- Civil engineer: Sir Owen Williams
- Designations

Listed Building – Grade II*
- Official name: Daily Express Building
- Designated: 3 October 1974
- Reference no.: 1218285

The Daily Express Building, located on Great Ancoats Street in Manchester, England, is a Grade II* listed building which was designed by engineer Sir Owen Williams. It was built in 1939 to house one of three Daily Express offices; the other two similar buildings are located in London and Glasgow.

The pre-World War II building is notable for its timeless, "space-age" quality and is often mistaken for being much younger than it is due to its futuristic avant garde appearance. The building is futurist art deco, specifically streamline moderne with its horizontal lines and curved corners. It is clad in a combination of opaque and vitrolite glass. It was considered highly radical at the time, and incorporates what was at the time a growing technology, curtain walling.

Unlike the London and Glasgow Express buildings, the Manchester building was designed by the engineer for all three buildings, Sir Owen Williams. It is considered the best of the three Express Buildings, and is admired by architects (such as Norman Foster) and Mancunians alike. The building was Grade II* listed in 1974, just 35 years after its initial construction.

== History ==
The building was required to accommodate existing growth at the Daily Express during the 1930s. During this decade the Daily Express was the most circulated newspaper in the world, with sales of up to 2.25 million. Max Aitken, Lord Beaverbrook, owner of the Daily Express, commissioned three buildings in London, Manchester and Glasgow which would help accommodate this growth. Beaverbrook stipulated that all three buildings should be of the highest architectural quality, and assigned renowned engineer Sir Owen Williams to assist in the delivery of them.

The London building opened in 1931, followed by the Glasgow building in 1937 and the Manchester building in 1939. Although similar to both buildings, it was uniquely different with Williams acting as engineer and architect; the former two were both designed by Ellis and Clark. The Glasgow and London buildings were designed by chartered architects while Williams, although not a qualified architect, was a competent designer. The interior of the London building is lavishly decorated, but suffers from a poor and dense site. The architecture of the exterior and site of the Manchester building is regarded as superior which allows the building to shine. Williams kept the design simple, preferring curved corners, cantilever roof rails and a three-storey turret; all these features share more in common with a Futurist Streamline Moderne design rather than Art Deco.

Only 35 years after opening, the building was Grade II* listed on 3 October 1974. The initial client of the building, the Daily Express, left Manchester in the late 1980s, possibly because other buildings in the area were in a poor state of repair. However, after the Daily Express decided to leave the city, there was no new press which expressed interest in continuing the building's role as a printing centre, so instead this was discontinued; but printing does still continue in the area.

== Architecture ==
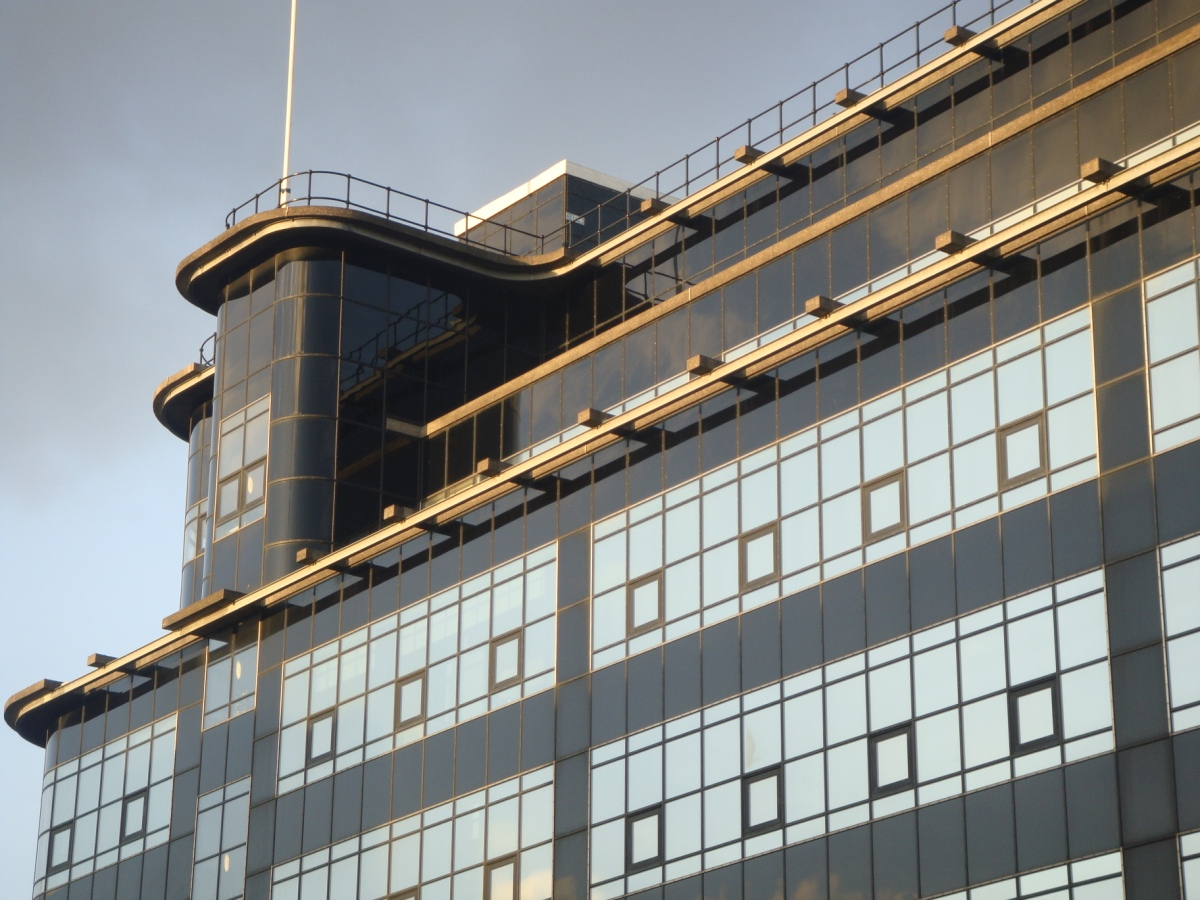
Express Building roof detail

The building's corners are curved, taking inspiration from the 1930s Streamline Moderne movement. It features typical Art Deco motifs: rounded corners, setbacks and a simple contrasting clear and black glass curtain wall. The Express began printing there in 1938, having been on the same site since 1927. Construction had to take place in stages so publishing could continue without interruption.

Originally, it was possible for passers by to peer into the main hall to see the large newspaper printing press. When the building was converted during the 1990s, the glass was made reflective so that outsiders could not see the interior of the building.

Nikolaus Pevsner described the building as an "all-glass front, absolutely flush, with rounded corners and translucent glass and black glass" and "a most impressive sight from the street, particularly when lit up at night."

The Express Building influenced Norman Foster during his youth, describing "I was very taken with the Daily Express building, for example, from the Thirties, wonderfully curved with black glass". "I knew it was there, and I went looking for it. It was not in a part of town that you could just stumble across it. I remember the chromed strips and the Vitrolite that the black façade was made of". Foster's first successful work was the Willis Faber and Dumas Headquarters (1975) in Ipswich, a building which share many features with the Express Building, such as the use of dark glass, curtain walling and few right angled corners. The Willis Building was Grade I listed in 1991.

== Recent history ==
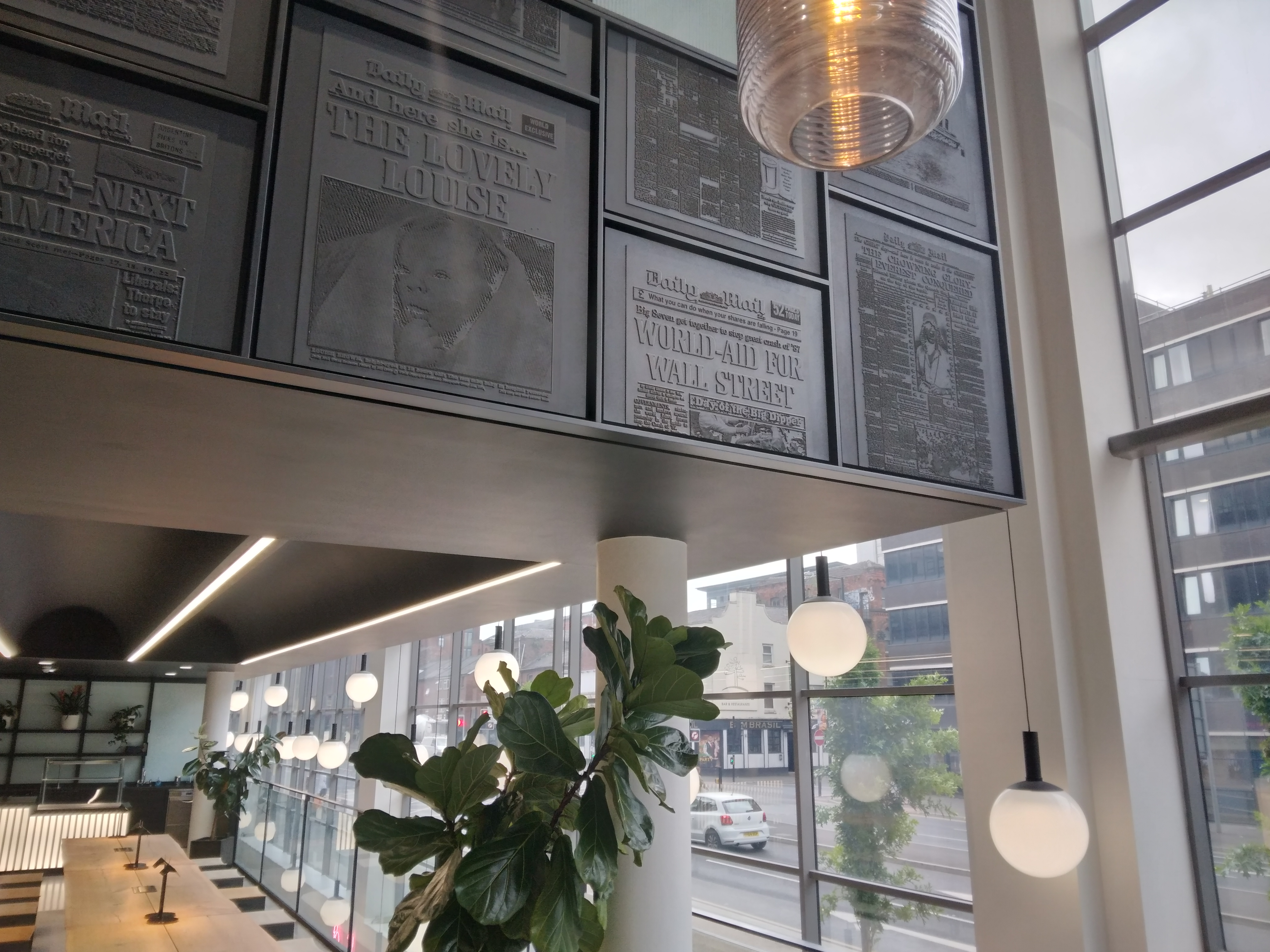
Artwork in the foyer of the building depicting news plates of the front covers of newspapers from important historical events

The Express Building has been extended four times in its history, the most recent being between 1993 and 1995, and was subsequently converted into apartments and offices for the Expressnetworks company. The former printing press was refurbished in the late 1990s and finished in 2000. This was able to be done only through funding by the Express Group and regeneration grants. The structure was sold to Washington, D.C.–based A&A Investments in 2006 for £20.5 million, after previous owners Stockbourne had occupied the building for 12 months. In April 2013, the building was put up for sale with an asking price of £9.5 million.

== See also ==
- Grade II* listed buildings in Greater Manchester
- Listed buildings in Manchester-M4
- The Man in the White Suit (1951 film) which features a shot of the building lit up at night
