= St John the Baptist Church, Beeston =

St John the Baptist
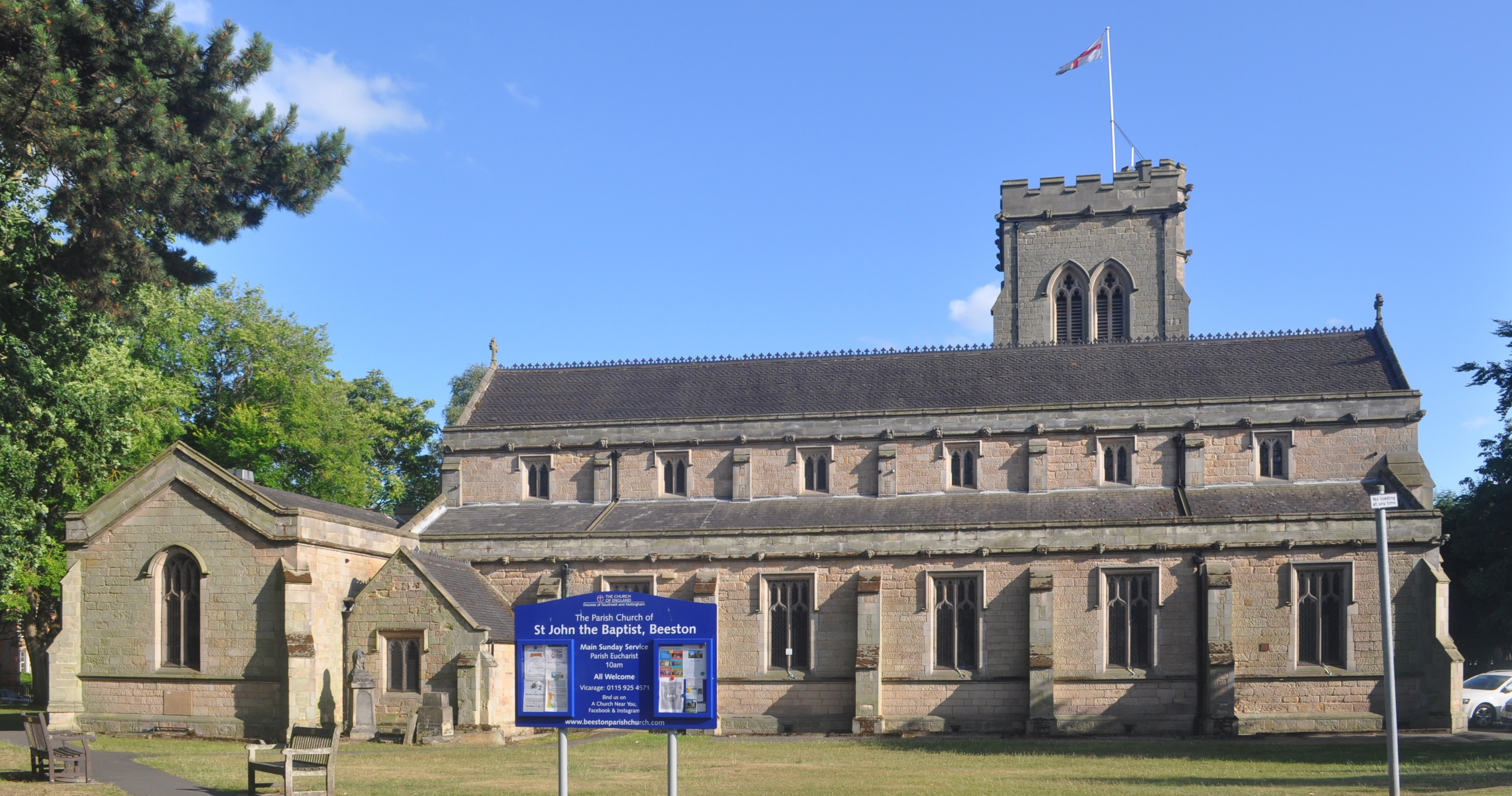
- St John the Baptist, Beeston in June 2025
- St John the Baptist
- 52°55′32″N 1°13′0″W
- OS grid reference: SK 52766 36744
- Location: Beeston, Nottinghamshire
- Country: England
- Denomination: Church of England
- Churchmanship: Broad Church
- Website: beestonparishchurch.com

History
- Dedication: St John the Baptist
- Consecrated: 5 September 1844

Architecture
- Heritage designation: Grade II listed
- Architect: George Gilbert Scott
- Groundbreaking: 1842
- Completed: 1844
- Construction cost: £3,600 (£395,467 in 2025)

Specifications
- Length: 115.66 feet (35.25 m)
- Width: 49.5 feet (15.1 m)
- Height: 64 feet (20 m)

Administration
- Province: Province of York
- Diocese: Diocese of Southwell and Nottingham
- Archdeaconry: Nottingham
- Deanery: Nottingham South
- Parish: Beeston

Clergy
- Vicar: Fr. Wayne Plimmer

St. John the Baptist Church is an Anglican church in Beeston, Nottinghamshire, England.

The church is Grade II listed by the Department for Digital, Culture, Media and Sport as it is a building of special architectural or historic interest.

== History ==
The church is medieval and the chancel remains, but the remainder was heavily restored and rebuilt in 1842 by George Gilbert Scott and William Bonython Moffatt. It was consecrated on 5 September 1844 by the Bishop of Lincoln.

The organ chamber was added in 1876 by Evans and Jolley of Nottingham. A new lectern and chancel stalls were provided. The chancel stalls were made by Mr. Tattershall of London.

An £860,000 re-ordering and renovation in 2007 moved the main entrance to the west end, and cleaned the interior, with new heating, seating and a new organ.

The font dates from the reign of King Henry III.

== List of incumbents ==
- 1267 John de Brademare
- 1275 Matthew de Leycestre
- 1327 William de Wyllesthorpe
- 1339 William de Beckford
- 1349 Thomas de Oxton
- 1376 William Askham
- 1384/5 Richard Mason of Chillwell
- 1401/2 Henry Serle
- 1405 Thomas Mareschall (or Marchall)
- 1420/1 John Thymelby (or Themelby)
- 1423 John Gynger
- 1431 John Ketul
- 1451 John Meyson
- 1455 Nicholas Bubwith
- 1456/7 William Taylor
- 1457 Richard Ellesley
- 1465 Nicholas Blakwall
- 1500/1 Richard Burton
- 1510 Christopher Twistfeld
- 1528 William Garford
- 1538 John Mottram
- 1557 Nicholas Holmes
- 1562 John Fisher
- 1592 William Jeffreys
- 1603/4 Walter Kynnersley or Kindersley.
- 1650 William Westoby
- 1661 William Crosse
- 1662/3 Henry Watkinson
- 1711 Thomas Trowell
- 1744 John Henson
- 1758 Timothy Wylde
- 1799 Thomas Bigsby
- 1822 John Francis Thomas Hurt
- 1854 Thomas John Oldrini
- 1885 Richard Davies Harries
- 1901 Arthur Curtis Beckton
- 1906 Miles Hammett Pitts- Tucker
- 1914 William Pakenham Cole-Sheane
- 1924 Leonard Norman Phillips
- 1936 George Hansford
- 1943 John Paul Henry Halet
- 1962 Frederic Norman Keen
- 1970 John Anthony Johnson
- 1986 Stephen Arthur Lowe
- 2000 George Bryan Barrodale
- 2006 Wayne Plimmer

== Organ ==
The first known organ was installed in 1854 by Kirkland and Jardine of Manchester. It cost £300 (equivalent to £28,755 in 2025), raised by subscription and was installed on a gallery. It was opened by the organist Edward John Hopkins on Tuesday 25 April 1854 at a service attended by the choir of Southwell Minster.

Some extra stops were added in 1856 and in 1876 it was further enlarged and improved and moved to the chancel following demolition of the gallery. In 1903 and 1909 it was renovated by Charles Lloyd of Nottingham and underwent further renovation in 1946. It was removed and replaced with an electronic organ in 1983. This has subsequently been replaced by a new electronic organ in 2008.

=== List of organists ===
- Samuel Thornhill
- Frederick Kirkby ca. 1862 – 1895
- Norman Frederick Byng Johnson 1895 – 1903 (afterwards organist of St Alkmund's Church, Derby)
- Horace Vernon Kington, FRCO, LRAM 1903 – 1925 (formerly organist of St. George's Church, Derby)
- John Hammond Fearon 1925 – 1931 (formerly organist of St. John the Baptist's Church, Leenside, Nottingham and St. George's Church, Netherfield)
- Stanley Nolan 1931 – 1935
- (James) Harold Allton, ARCO(ChM), LRAM 1936 – 1961 (formerly organist of Emmanuel Church, Woodborough Road)
- Michael Grantham 1961 – 1986
- Philip Sherratt 2010 - 2022
- Chris Warren (Director of Music) and Philip Miles (organist)

== The bells and tower ==
The tower contains a peal of ten bells bells all cast by John Taylor of Loughborough. The tenor weight is 1,946 pounds (883 kg). The tenor, 9, 7, 6, and 5 were cast in 1870, numbers 3 and 4 in 1877, number 8 in 1967, and numbers 1 and 2 in 1998.

== Churchyard ==
In July 1919 the vicar planted an Oak Tree in the churchyard in commemoration of Peace Day. This tree is now one of the largest in the churchyard.

== Gallery ==
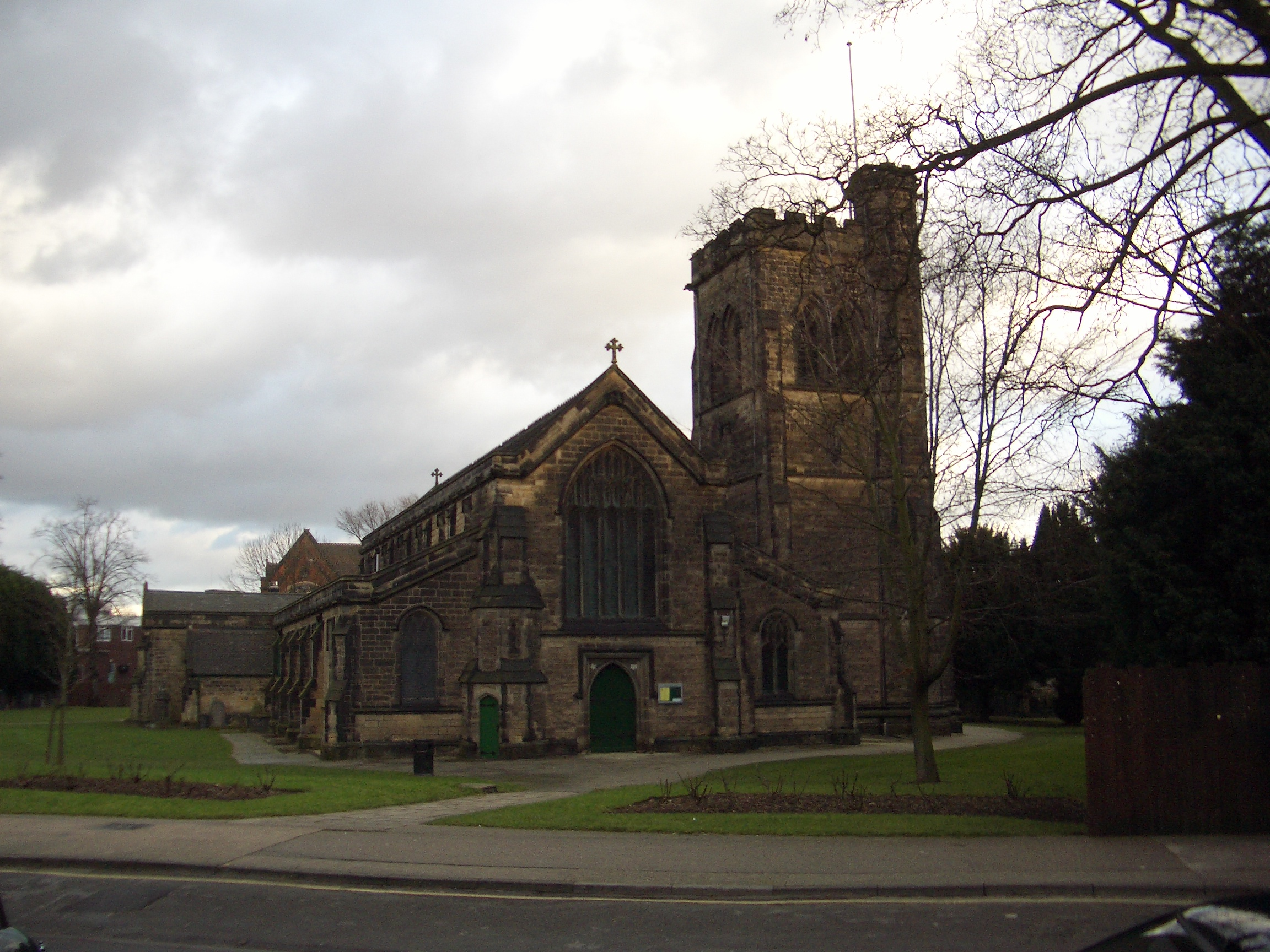

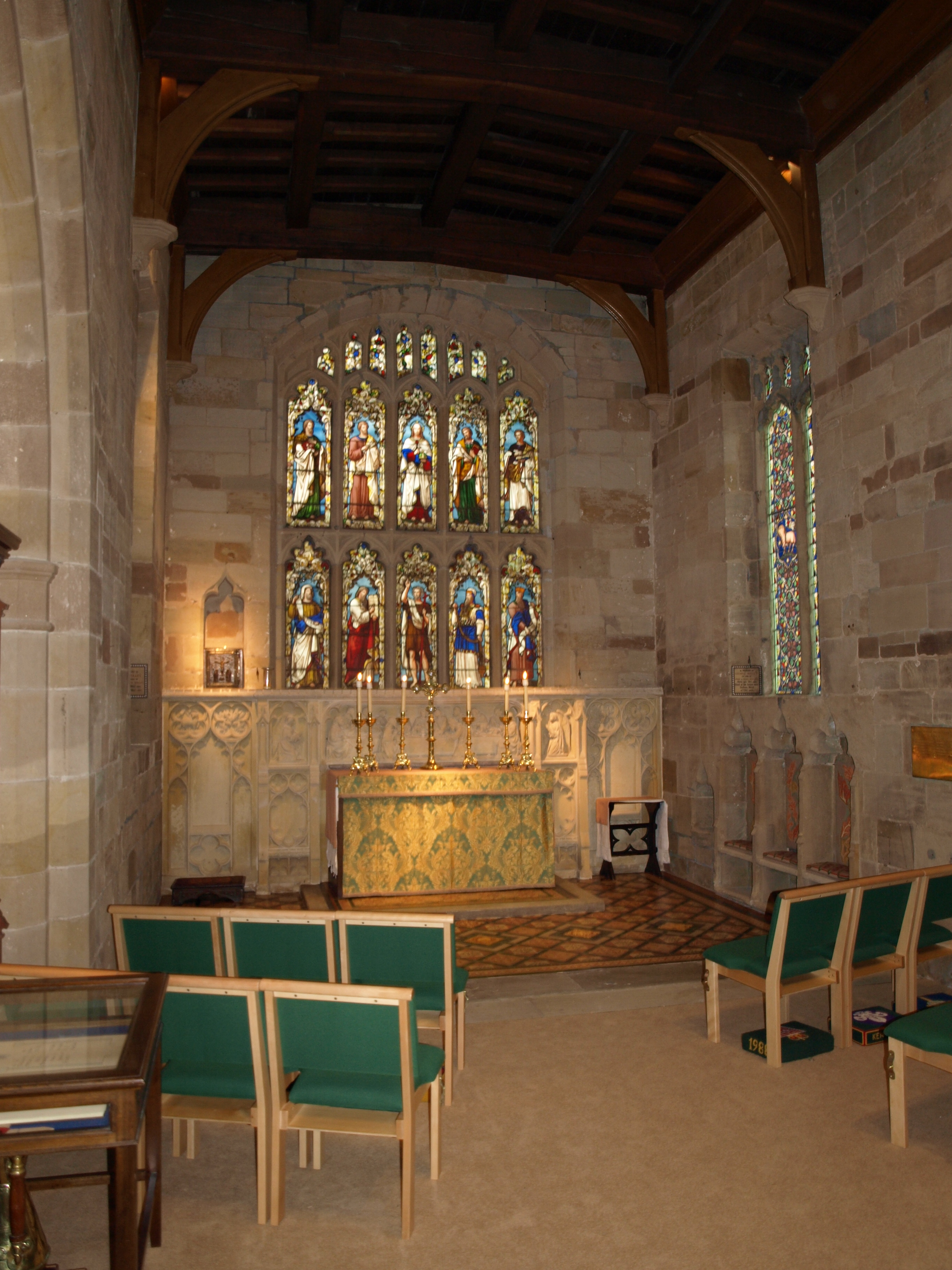
The chancel

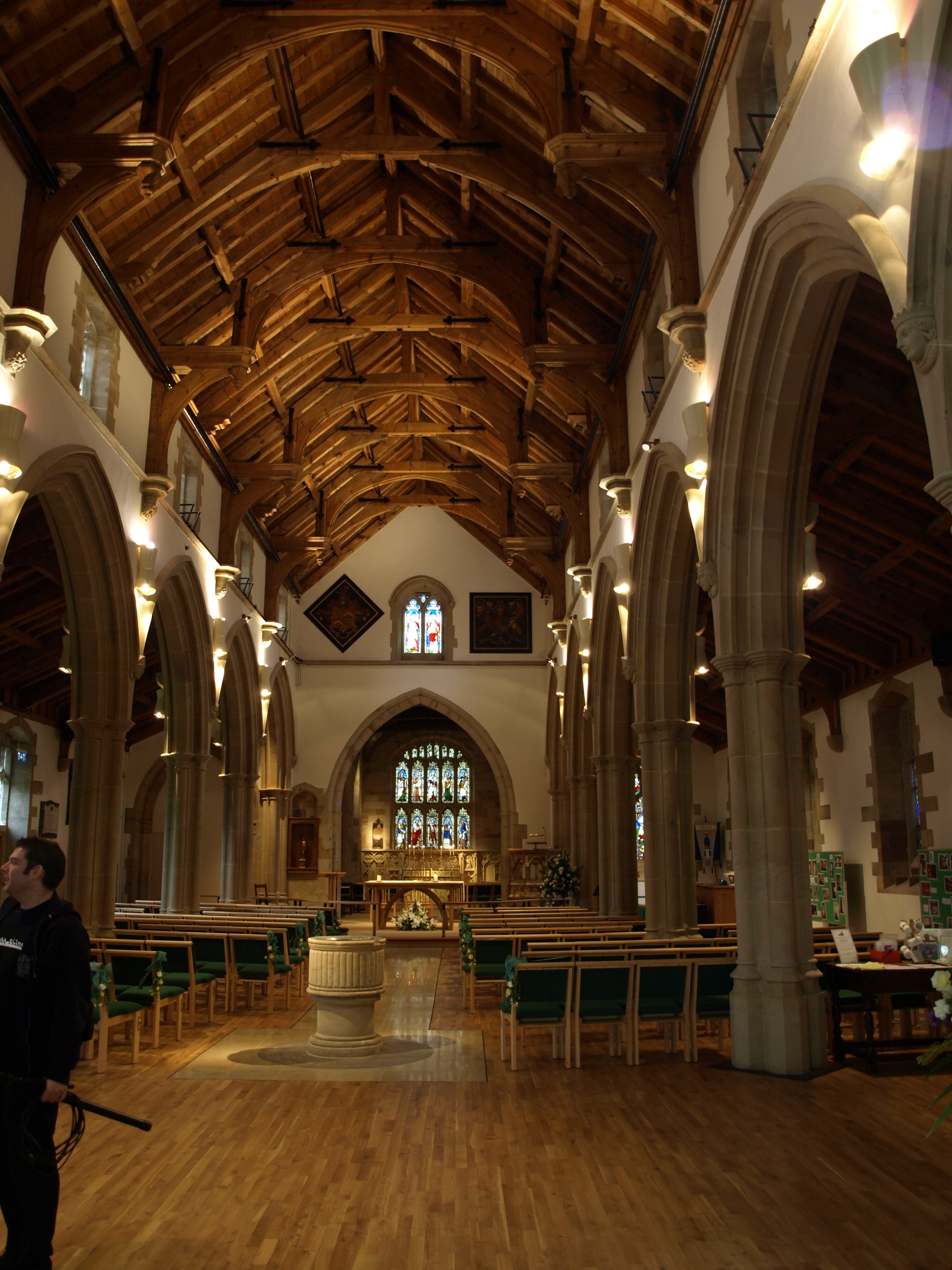
The nave looking east

== See also ==
- Listed buildings in Beeston, Nottinghamshire

== Sources ==
- The Buildings of England, Nottinghamshire, Nikolaus Pevsner.
