= Daily Express Building, London =

Building in London, United Kingdom

Coordinates: 51.5144°N 0.1060°W

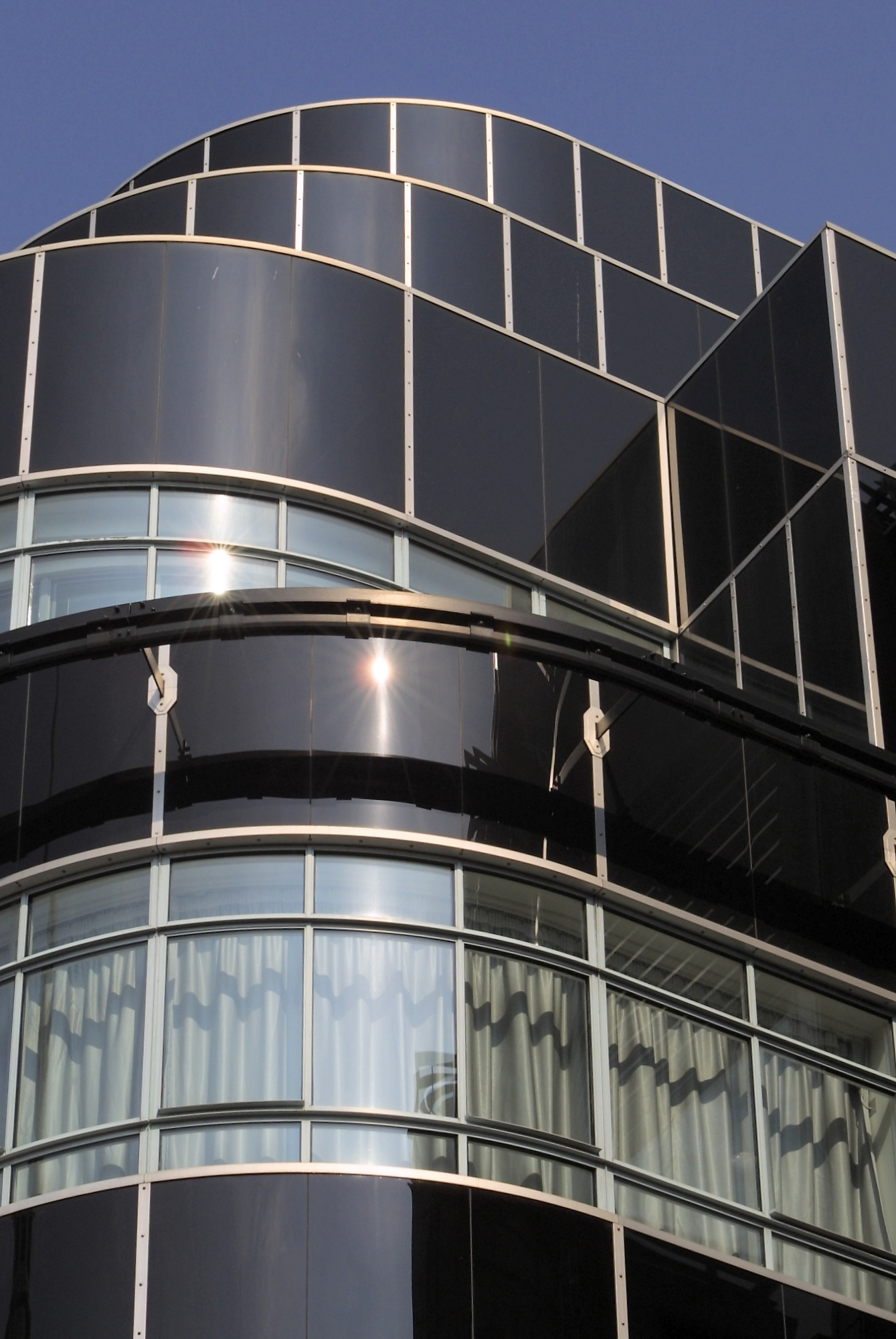
Black vitrolite panelling on the Daily Express Building

The Daily Express Building (120 Fleet Street) is a Grade II* listed building located in Fleet Street in the City of London. It was designed in 1932 by Ellis & Clarke to serve as the home of the Daily Express newspaper and is one of the most prominent examples of art-deco / Streamline Moderne architecture in London.

The exterior features a black façade with rounded corners in vitrolite and clear glass, with chromium strips. The flamboyant lobby, designed by Robert Atkinson, includes plaster reliefs by Eric Aumonier, silver and gilt decorations, a magnificent silvered pendant lamp and an oval staircase. The furniture inside the building was, for the most part, designed by Betty Joel.

The Grade II* listing relates not only to the architectural features but also to the massive reinforced concrete stacked portal frame structure designed by Sir Owen Williams.

As part of a redevelopment of the surrounding site the building was entirely refurbished in 2000 by John Robertson Architects. The foyer was recreated largely from photographs and the façade completely upgraded. The concrete portal frame structure was preserved.

The lobby of this building was open to the public on London Open House day, over the weekend of 19 and 20 September 2009. Members of the public were allowed to view the lobby, which is normally only accessible to employees of the building and invited guests.

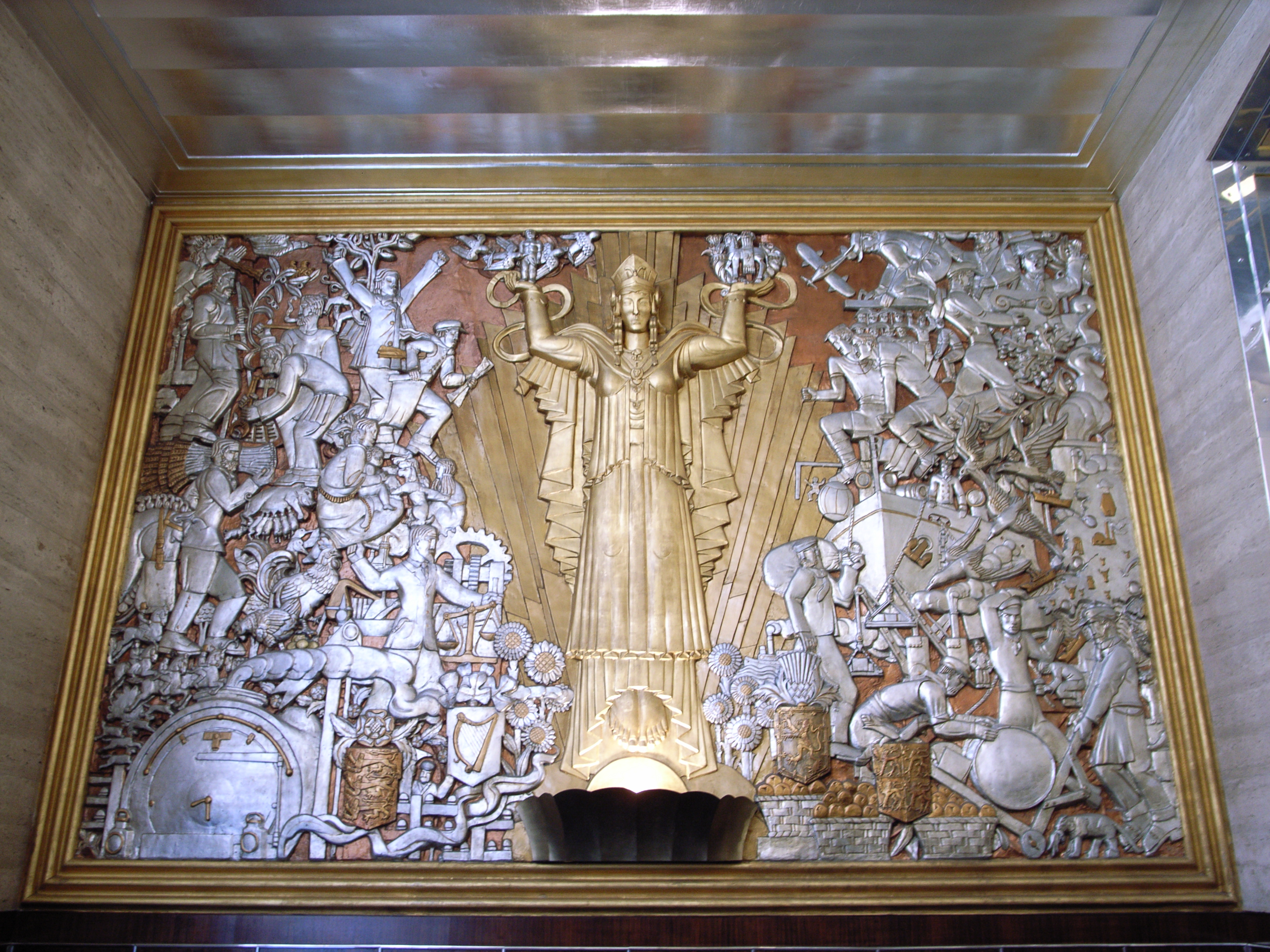
"Britain" panel from the Daily Express building foyer

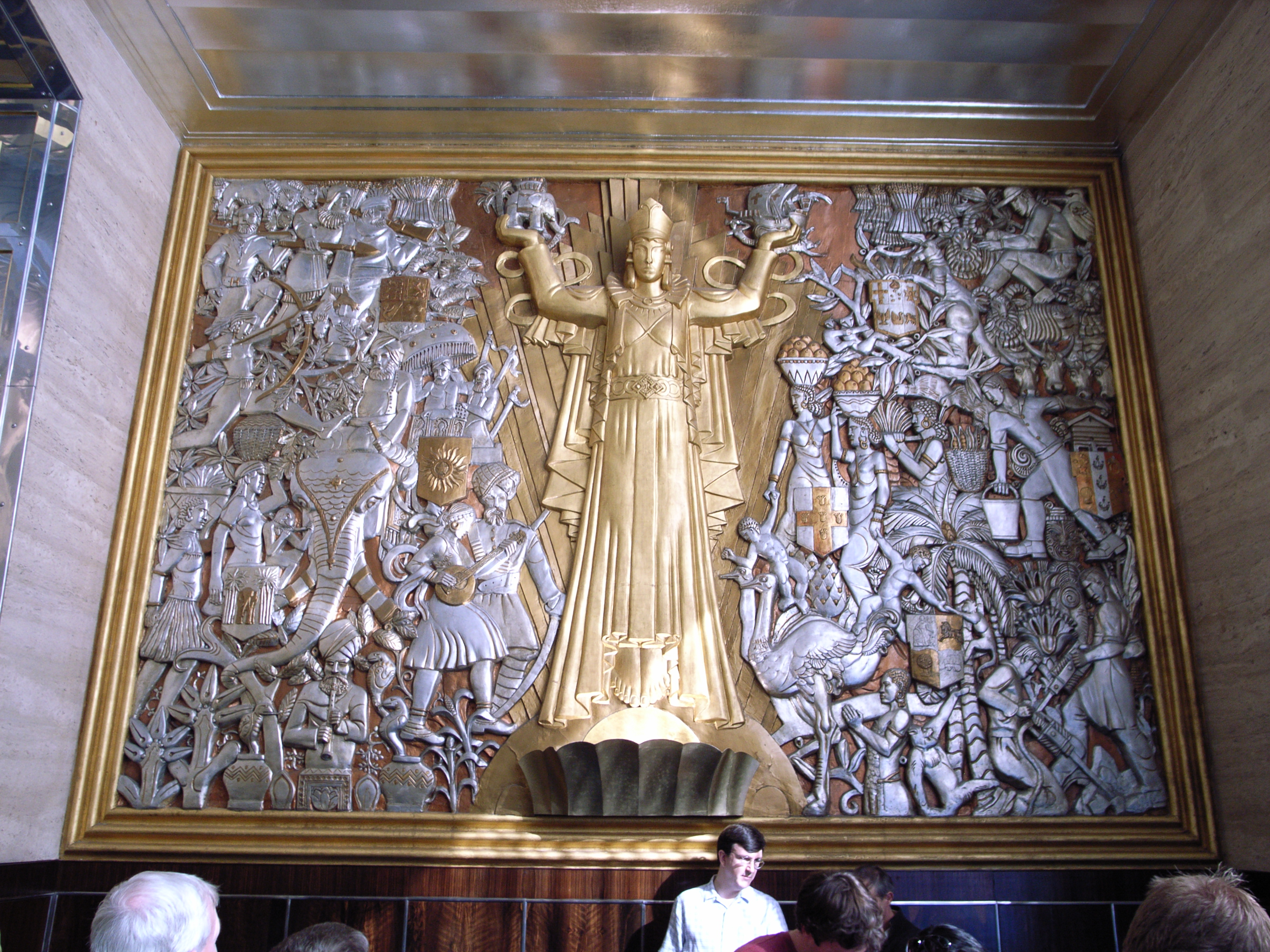
"Empire" panel from the Daily Express building foyer

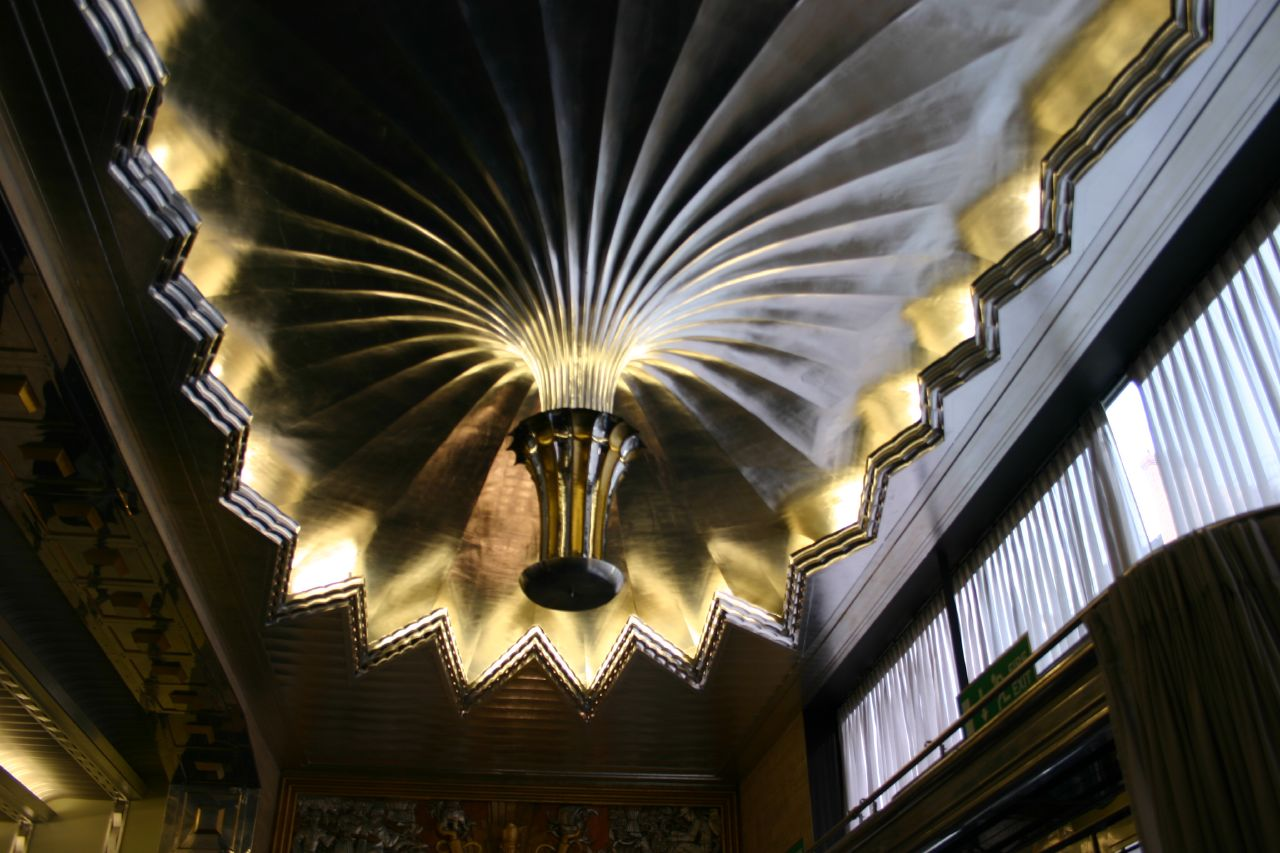
The aluminium leaf recessed ceiling and pendant lamp

The building is currently occupied by Goldman Sachs.

== Sister Express buildings in Manchester and Glasgow ==
The company also constructed two sister buildings of similar design during this period. The Express Building, Manchester (1939) was critically acclaimed as the best of the three due to its superior exterior design and better site and was the only one of the three to be architecturally designed by Sir Owen Williams. The 1936 building in Glasgow housed the offices of the Glasgow Herald and Evening Times newspapers from 1980 to circa 2000, but has now been converted into flats.

== In the media ==
The building, the paper and its best remembered editor, Arthur Christiansen (who in reality had already relinquished the role), featured in the British science fiction film The Day the Earth Caught Fire (1961), in which actors Edward Judd and Leo McKern have leading roles. The satirical magazine Private Eye invariably referred to the building, in the days when it was occupied by the Daily Express, as 'The Black Lubyanka'.
