= Owen Williams (engineer) =

British engineer and architect

Sir Owen Williams
- Owen Williams, circa 1960s
- Born: Evan Owen Williams; 20 March 1890; Tottenham, London, England
- Died: 23 May 1969 (aged 79); Hemel Hempstead, Hertfordshire, England
- Spouse: Dorothy Elizabeth Baker (married 1947)
- Children: Owen Tudor Williams
- Engineering career
- Discipline: Architecture, engineering
- Institutions: University of London
- Practice name: Sir Owen Williams & Partners
- Projects: Gravelly Hill Interchange, Birmingham
- Significant design: Daily Express Building, Manchester; Boots Factory Site Buildings, Nottingham
- Significant advance: Concrete engineering

Sir Evan Owen Williams (20 March 1890 – 23 May 1969) was a British engineer and architect, known for being the principal engineer for the original Wembley Stadium, and later Gravelly Hill Interchange (known popularly as Spaghetti Junction) as well as a number of key modernist buildings, including the Express Building in Manchester and the D10 and D6 Buildings at the Boots Factory Site in Nottingham.

== Career ==
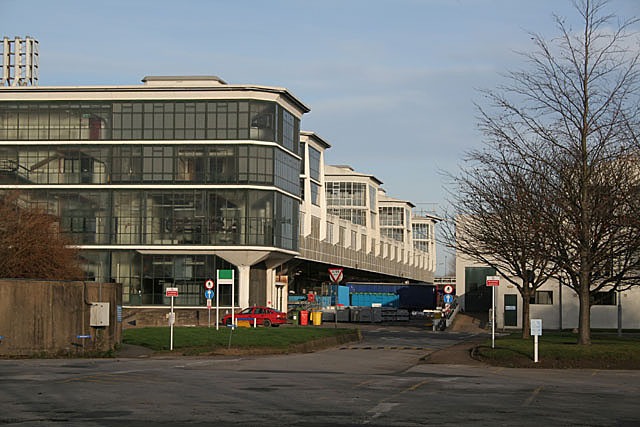
Boots D10 Building in Nottingham, built 1930–32 (Grade I listed in 1971)

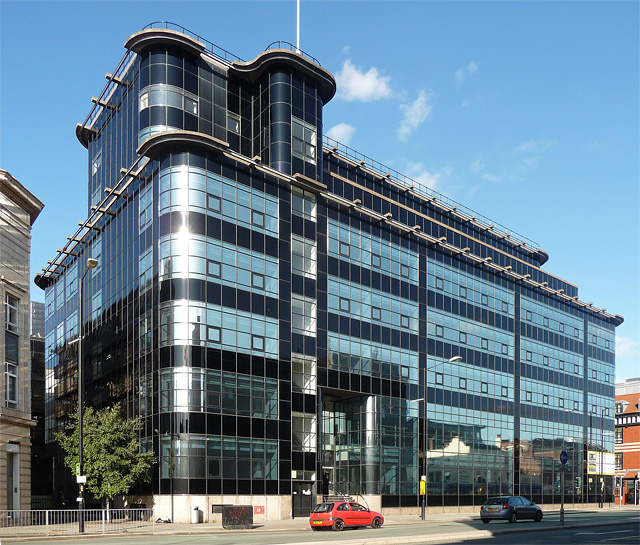
Express Building, Manchester, built 1936–39, considered Williams finest architectural work (Grade II* listed in 1974)

Williams was born at 16 Caroline Terrace in Tottenham, London, England, on 20 March 1890. He was the son of Evan Owen Williams, a Welsh-born grocer and Mary Roberts. Originally both farmers, they moved to London some years before Owen was born. Williams had two sisters and two brothers. Mary Kate died young, but the second born, Elizabeth Maud, became an author. Owen had an older brother, Robert Osian, who was a successful banker and came out of retirement to manage the finances of his brother's engineering practice which was launched in 1940. Williams attended Tottenham Grammar School and excelled in mathematics. He was apprenticed to the Electrical Tramways Co. in London in 1907 and at the same time did an engineering degree at the University of London.

In 1912, Williams assumed a position as engineer and designer with the Trussed Concrete Company. Seven years later, he started his own consulting firm, Williams Concrete Structures.

He was then appointed chief consulting civil engineer to the British Empire Exhibition which included the old Wembley Stadium. The commission also included the Palace of Industry building in Brent, the first building in the United Kingdom to use concrete as the exterior.

The building was listed in 1997 in recognition of this but was delisted in 2004 after an appeal by a property developer. Williams was recognised for his achievements and received a knighthood in 1923 or 1924.

Through the exhibition, Williams met its architect, Maxwell Ayrton, and they worked together on the design of Williams's bridges in Scotland.

Williams designed his buildings as functional structures sheathed in decorative facades. More an engineer than an architect, he produced a series of reinforced concrete buildings during the period between the wars. After World War II he worked on developing the first plan for Britain's motorway system. His other works include the Dorchester Hotel, buildings at the Boots Factory Site in Beeston, Nottinghamshire, the M1 motorway and the Pioneer Health Centre in Peckham, south London.

In the 1940s, the company expanded and became Sir Owen Williams and Partners. This followed the building of the Daily Express Building, Manchester, which Williams designed. Contrary to popular belief, the Manchester building was the only one of the three Express Buildings which Williams designed – the others in Glasgow and London were designed by Ellis and Clark.

Although Williams was more of an engineer than an architect, the Express Building in Manchester was lauded for its architecture and demonstrated his proficiency as an architect. Owen Williams' grandson, Richard Williams, was chief executive of the Owen Williams Group until its acquisition by Amey in 2006.

== List of works ==
(Including bridges)

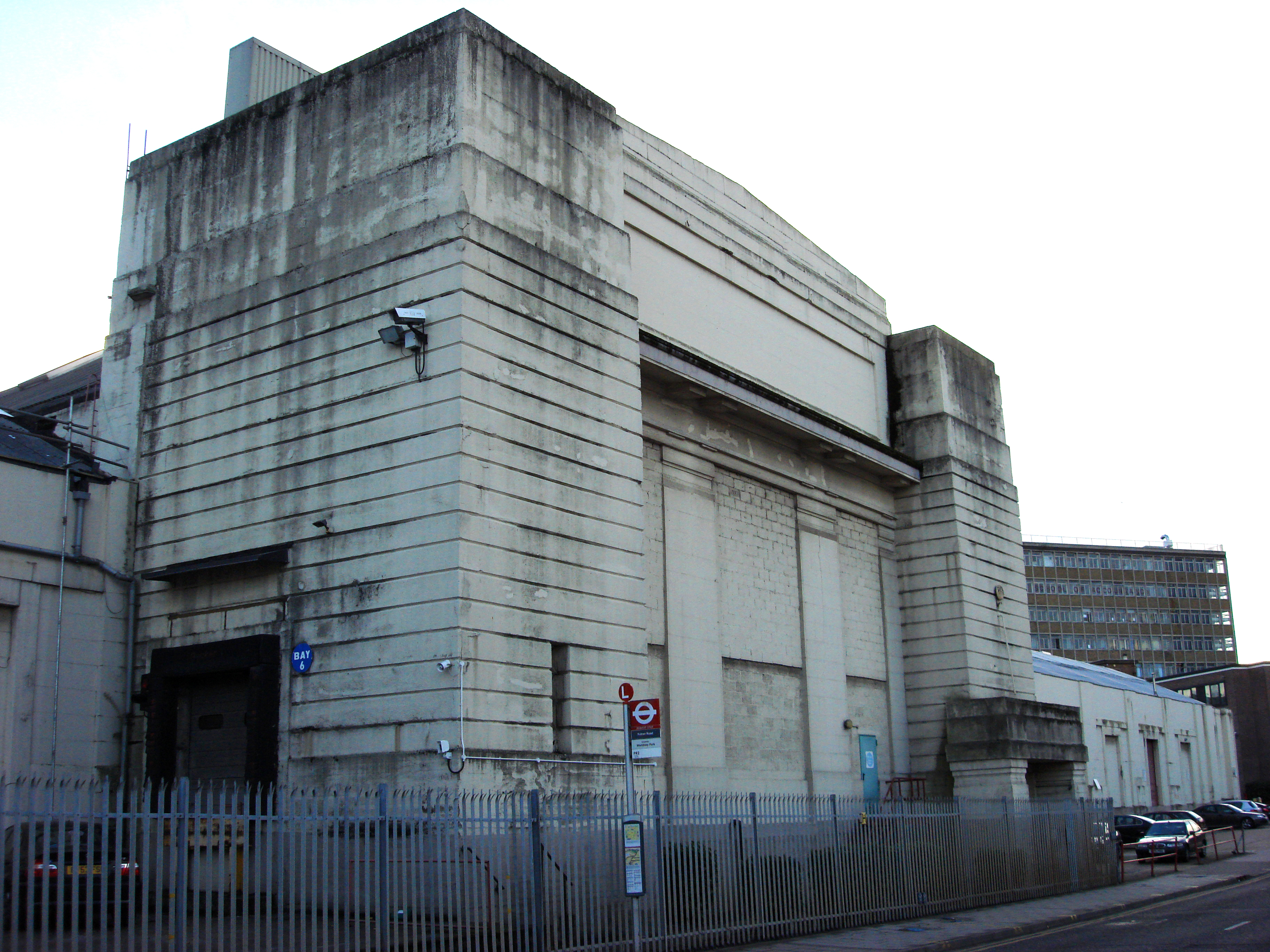
Palace of Industry Building in London, first major public building in Britain where concrete was used for the exterior

- 1913–14 – Resident engineer for Trussed Concrete Steel Company at Patent Fuel Works, Swansea Docks
- 1914–16 – Chief estimating engineer, Trussed Concrete Steel Company
- 1916–17 – Assistant aeroplane designer, Wells Aviation
- 1917–18 – Various ships and slipways, Poole, Dorset
- 1921–24 – British Empire Exhibition buildings at Wembley Park with Maxwell Ayrton (included Palace of Industry Building which was listed in 1997 and delisted in 2004)
- 1921–24 – Wembley Stadium with Maxwell Ayrton
- 1924–25 – Lea Valley Viaduct and Bridge with Maxwell Ayrton
- 1924–25 – Parc des Attractions, Paris
- 1924–26 – Findhorn Bridge with Maxwell Ayrton
- 1924–27 – Road Bridge, Shepherd Leys Wood
- 1924–29 – Bournemouth Pavilion with Home & Knight
- 1925–26 – Spey Bridge, Newtonmore ... architect: Maxwell Ayrton
- 1925–26 – Crubenmore and Loch Alvie Bridges ... architect: Maxwell Ayrton
- 1925–26 – Duntocher Bridge ... architect: Maxwell Ayrton
- 1925–26 – Belfast Water Tower, Northern Ireland
- 1925–26 – Wansford Bridge, Huntingdonshire with Maxwell Ayrton
- 1926–28 – Dalnamein Bridge with Maxwell Ayrton
- 1926–28 – Carr Bridge (demolished) with Maxwell Ayrton
- 1926–28 – Lochy Bridge with Maxwell Ayrton
- 1927–28 – Brora Bridge
- 1927-28 – Clapton Stadium
- 1927–30 – Montrose Bridge
- 1928–29 – Pont-Rhyd-Owen Bridge
- 1928–30 – Wadham Road Viaduct
- 1928–30 – Harnham Bridge, Wiltshire
- 1928–30 – Pilkington's Warehouse, London
- 1929–30 – The Dorchester Hotel proposal
- 1929–31 – Wakefield Bridge
- 1929–31 – Llechryd Bridge proposal
- 1929–31 – Daily Express, London as engineer with architects H. O. Ellis & Clarke
- 1930–32 – Boots Packed Wet Goods Factory (D10 Building)
- 1931–33 – Sainsburys Factory and warehouse
- 1932–34 – Cumberland Garage and Car Park
- 1933–34 – Empire Pool, Wembley Park
- 1933–35 – Pioneer Health Centre, London
- 1933–36 – Residential flats, Stanmore
- 1935–37 – Provincial Newspaper office, London
- 1935–38 – Odhams Printing Works
- 1935–38 – Boots Packed Dry Goods Factory (D6 Building)
- 1935–39 – Daily Express Building, Manchester
- 1936–37 – Lilley & Skinner office and warehouse extension
- 1936–38 – Dollis Hill Synagogue
- 1936–39 – Scottish Daily Express Building, Glasgow
- 1938–39 – Daily News Garage, London
- 1939–41 – Vickers-Armstrong Aircraft Factory completed by Oscar Faber & Partners
- 1944–45 – Wilvan Houses
- 1944–45 – Mobile home
- 1945–67 – Newport By-pass (present-day M4)
- 1950–55 – BOAC Maintenance Headquarters, Heathrow
- 1951–59 – M1 Motorway phase one (with James Price as chief resident engineer)
- 1953–66 – Port Talbot By-pass
- 1954–56 – BOAC Wing Hangars, Heathrow
- 1955–61 – Daily Mirror Building (now demolished)
- 1956–67 – M1 Motorway phase two (with James Price as chief resident engineer)
