= Pigmented structural glass =

High-strength, colored glass

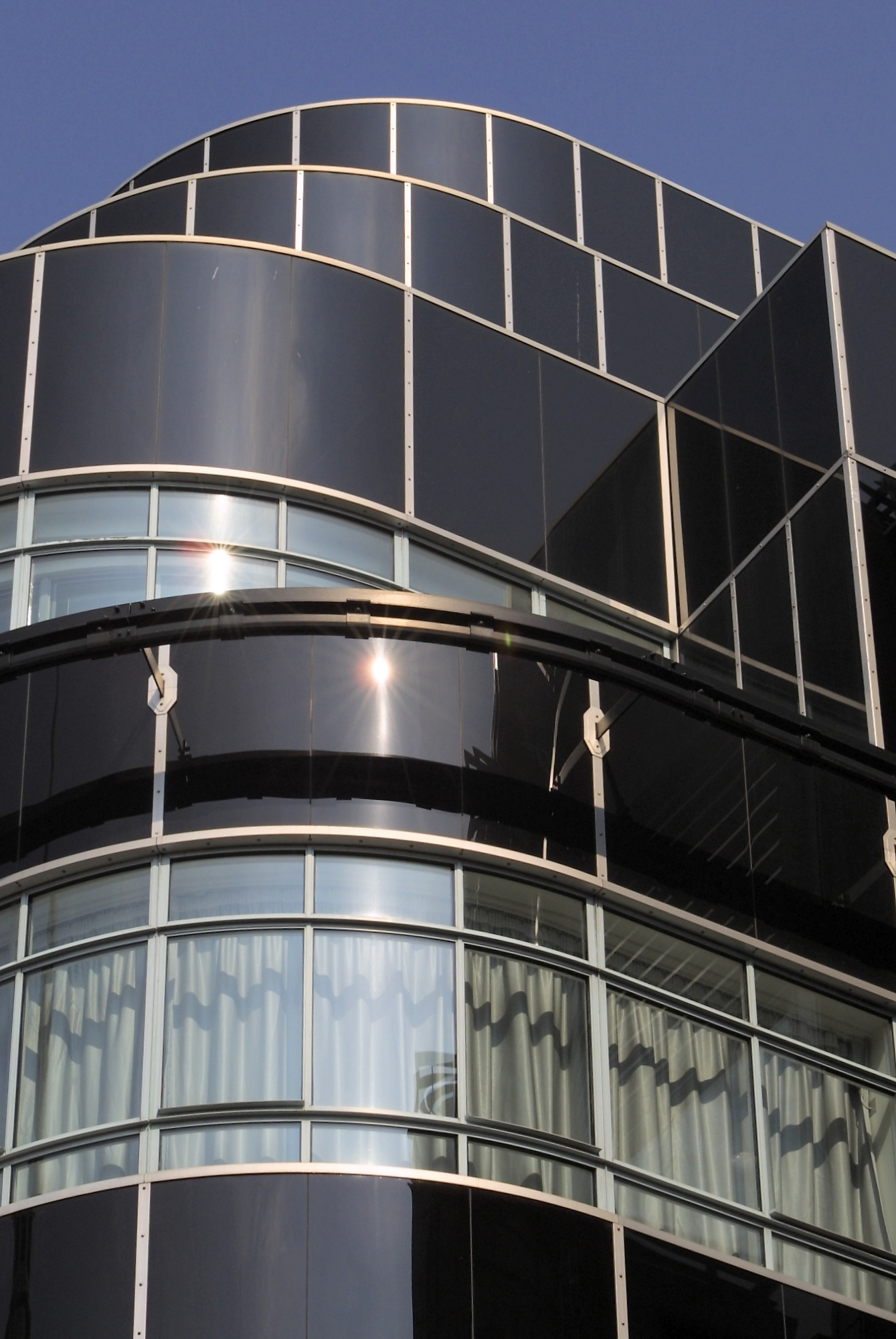
Black Vitrolite panelling on the Daily Express Building in Fleet Street, London.

Pigmented structural glass, also known generically as structural glass and as vitreous marble, and marketed under the names Carrara glass, Sani Onyx, and Vitrolite, among others, is a high-strength, colored glass. Developed in the United States in 1900, it was widely used around the world in the first half of the 20th century in Art Deco and Streamline Moderne buildings. It also found use as a material for signs, tables, and areas requiring a hygienic surface. Over time, the trademarked name "Vitrolite" became a generic term for the glass.

== Overview ==
Pigmented structural glass (Note: Pigmented structural glass is also known as "structural glass". However, the term "structural glass" can encompass a wide range of high-strength glass (such as glass brick), and is not the preferred term for pigmented structural glass.) was developed in 1900 in the United States by the Marrietta Manufacturing Company of Indianapolis, Indiana. The product was made by combining borax, cryolite, kaolinite, manganese, silica, feldspar, and fluorspar. (Note: Fluorspar was eventually replaced by other kinds of fluorides.) The fluorides made the glass opaque.

These materials were fused into glass at a temperature of 3,000 °F (1,650 °C) and then annealed. The annealing process took much longer than it did for plate glass, often lasting three to five days. This left the glass very strong, with a compressive strength about 40 percent greater than marble. If the product was to be affixed to another surface (such as the exterior of a building), one side of the slab was grooved before the glass hardened.

The exposed side(s) of the material was flame polished, which left the product highly reflective and brilliant. Later manufacturing techniques used fine sand to polish the surface, followed by felt blocks and iron(III) oxide powder.

Originally, only beige, black, and white colors were available. But by the 1930s, new manufacturing methods could make pigmented structure glass translucent, and more than 30 colors were available. In time, even agate- and marble-like color patterns were available. Black structural glass was sometimes silvered, to give it a reflective finish.

Pigmented structural glass could be manufactured in flat panels or curves, and in a wide range of sizes and thicknesses. Small mosaic tiles, affixed to flexible fabric, were another option for fitting the product to curved surfaces. In time, manufacturers learned that pigmented structural glass could be carved, cut, inlaid, laminated, sandblasted, and sculpted to create a wide range of finishes and textures. When translucent, it could be illuminated from within.

== Manufacturing history ==
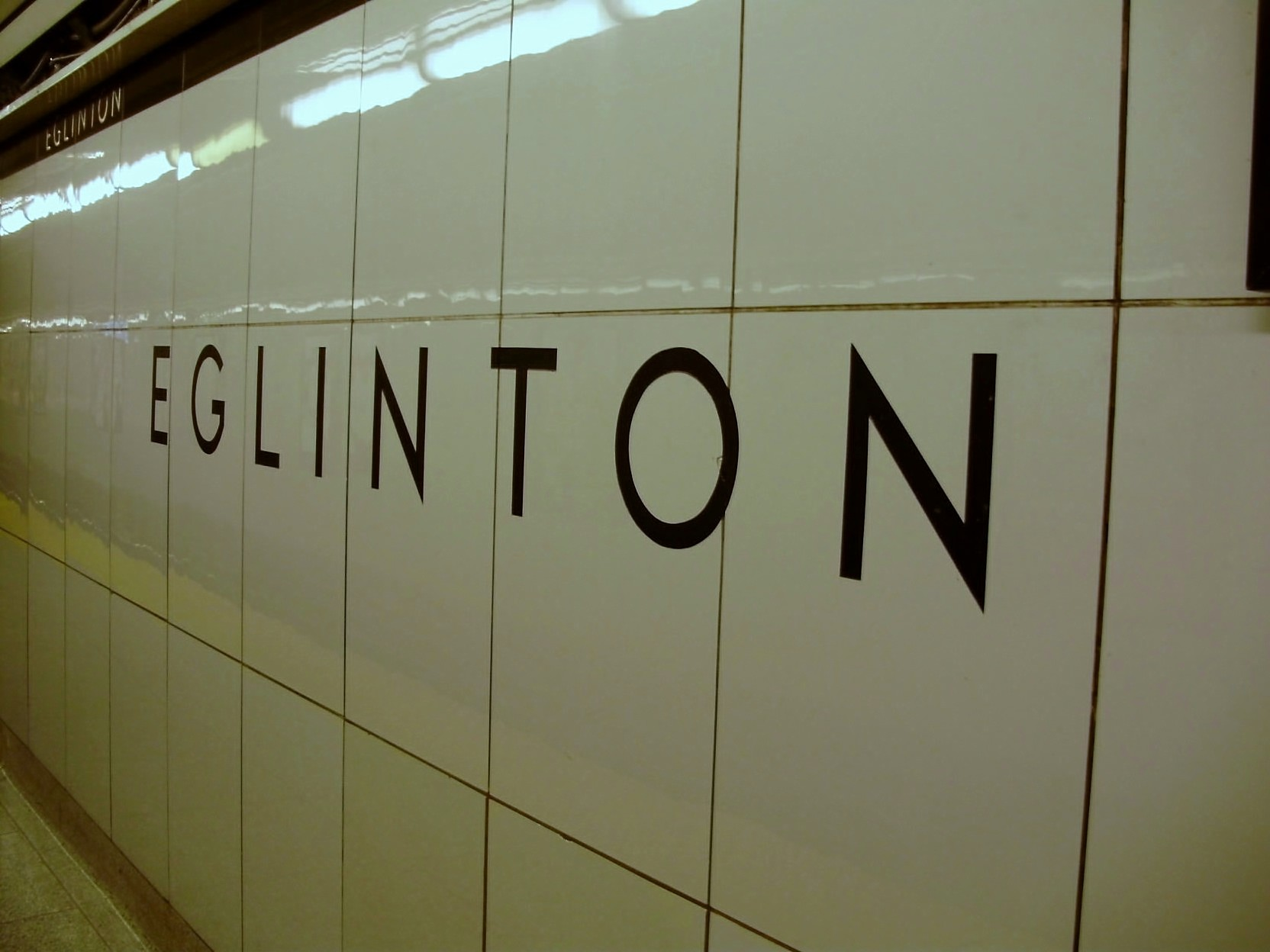
Vitrolite tiling at Eglinton station in Toronto.

Pigmented structural glass was originally marketed under the name "Sani Onyx" by Marrietta Manufacturing. The company also used the name "Sani Rox", while the term "vitreous marble" was coined by the firm as a general descriptive. By 1906, the Pittsburgh Plate Glass Company had developed its own pigmented structural glass, which it called "Carrara glass". (Note: "Carrara glass" was named for the white or blue-grey Carrara marble, for which pigmented structural glass was a low-cost alternative.) The same year, the Penn-American Plate Company began making a pigmented structural glass which it called "Novus Sanitary Structural Glass". In 1916, The Vitrolite Company began manufacturing the product under the name "Vitrolite", which eventually became a generic name for pigmented structural glass. (Note: The Meyercord Company of Chicago, Illinois, and the Opalite Tile Company of Monaca, Pennsylvania, founded a new firm, Meyercord-Carter, in 1908. Meyercord made "vitrolite" signs. These were curved or flat opal glass signs in a metal frame on which a company logo or an advertisement were painted. Meyercord had partnered with Opalite to manufacture vitrolite signs by using clear decals instead of paint. Meyercord-Carter was founded to formalize their partnership. Meyercord-Carter was renamed The Vitrolite Company in 1910. The Vitrolite Company was acquired by Libbey-Owens-Ford in 1935.) In time, about eight American firms made pigmented structural glass, although Carrara glass and Vitrolite dominated the market. Names used by these and other companies to market the product included "Argentine", "Glastone", "Marbrunite", "Nuralite", and "Opalite". Pigmented structural glass was also manufactured by Pilkington Brothers in the United Kingdom.

Marrietta Manufacturing originally marketed pigmented structural glass as a lining for refrigerators. Industrial consumers quickly found new uses for the product as countertops, dados, bathroom partitions, storefront signs, and tabletops. By the early 1920s, it was advertised as an inexpensive alternative to marble or ceramic tile. The Art Deco and Steamline Moderne architectural movements vastly increased the market for pigmented structural glass. Its first important architectural use came in 1912, when it was used for bathroom stall partitions and dados in the Woolworth Building in New York City. By 1929, 5,000,000 square feet (460,000 m^{2}) of pigmented structural glass was being manufactured in the United States. Throughout the 1930s, the product also found a use as cladding for storefronts, entryways, lobbies, and even as ceiling material. It was seen as an inexpensive means of making a dated building look modern.

The Great Depression significantly reduced the demand for pigmented structural glass. American production reached only 1,000,000 square feet (93,000 m^{2}) in 1933. By the 1950s, changing architectural tastes had vastly reduced the demand for the product. The last two American manufacturers ceased production about 1960: Libbey-Owens-Ford shut down its pigmented structural glass plant in 1958, followed by Pittsburgh Plate Glass in the early 1960s. (Note: One source claims production ceased in the United States in the late 1940s.) Production continued in the United Kingdom until 1968, and in Bavaria, Germany, until the end of the 20th century.

== Characteristics ==
Unlike masonry, pigmented structural glass does not craze, swell, or warp. It is highly burn and stain resistant, and is colorfast. Since it is a glass, it is impervious to moisture. It cannot absorb pathogenic bacteria, viruses, pathogenic fungi, or parasites, and is easy to render aseptic.

== Bibliography ==
- Dyson, Carol J. (1995). "Structural Glass". In Jester, Thomas C. (ed.). Twentieth-Century Building Materials: History and Conservation. New York: McGraw-Hill. ISBN 9780070325739.
- Esperdy, Gabrielle M. (2008). Modernizing Main Street : architecture and consumer culture in the New Deal. Chicago: University of Chicago Press. ISBN 9780226218021.
- Kappos, Ludwig (1987). Preservation Briefs 1-14: Recognizing and Resolving Common Preservation and Repair Problems Prior to Working on Historic Buildings. Washington, D.C.: U.S. Government Printing Office. ISBN 9780160035487.
- Kious, Kevin; Roussin, Donald (2012). Breweriana: American Beer Collectibles. Oxford, UK: Shire. ISBN 9780747810445.
- Parker, Harry; Hauf, Harold Dana (1977). Simplified Mechanics and Strength of Materials. New York: Wiley. ISBN 9780471665625.
- Pender, Robyn; Godfraind, Sophie (2011). Practical Building Conservation: Glass and Glazing. Farnham, Surrey, England: Ashgate. ISBN 9780754645573.
- Piazza, Gregory; Machielse, Allan; Austin, Dan (2015). A History of Detroit's Palmer Park. Charleston, S.C.: The History Press. ISBN 9781626197848. OCLC 907885624.
- United States Department of the Interior (2004). The Preservation of Historic Architecture: The U.S. Government's Official Guidelines for Preserving Historic Homes. Guilford, Conn.: Lyons Press. ISBN 9781592281268.
- "The Vitrolite Company: Sanitary Structural Slabs". Sweet's Architectural Catalog. 15th Annual Edition. New York: Sweet's Catalogue Service. 1920.
- "The Vitrolite Co.". The Modern Hospital Yearbook. Chicago: The Modern Hospital Publishing Company. 1919.
