= Evan Owen (Allen) =

Welsh writer and poet (1805–1852)

Evan Owen Allen (1805–1852) was a Welsh writer and poet born at Pant-y-llin, near Llanrwst, (Caernarfonshire at the time), the son of a farmer.

== Writings ==
Allen contributed to Seren Gomer, which had been the first Welsh-language weekly newspaper, and to other publications. However, by Allen's time Seren Gomer was a monthly, and it would later become a quarterly associated with the Baptists.

None of Allen's poetry is thought to have been published.

== Death and burial ==
He died at Ruthin, Denbighshire on 16 December 1852. He was buried at Llanfwrog Baptist Chapel.

== Sources ==
- Geirlyfr Bywgraffiadol o Enwogion Cymru (1870), p. 27 (in Welsh)
