= Clumber =

Clumber may refer to:

- Clumber Park (formerly the site of Clumber House) - a country park and National Trust property in Nottinghamshire, UK
- Clumber Chapel - The Church of St. Mary the Virgin, Clumber Park, Nottinghamshire, UK
- Clumber papers, Clumber collection, or Newcastle of Clumber papers - part of the Manuscripts and Special Collections, The University of Nottingham
- Clumber Spaniel - a dog breed developed in Britain
- Clumber - a character in the John Ford film The World Moves On (1934)
- Clumber - a British LNER Class B17 locomotive (1930-1969)
- Clumber - a populated place in Anne Arundel County, Maryland, United States
- Clumber - a populated place southwest of Brisbane, Queensland, Australia
