= Listed buildings in Carburton =

Carburton is a civil parish in the Bassetlaw District of Nottinghamshire, England. The parish contains seven listed buildings that are recorded in the National Heritage List for England. Of these, one is listed at Grade II*, the middle of the three grades, and the others are at Grade II, the lowest grade. The parish contains the village of Carburton and the surrounding area. To the east of the area is the west part of Clumber Park, and the listed buildings here are lodges, gate piers and a bridge. The other listed buildings consist of a church, houses and farm buildings.

== Key ==
Grade	Criteria
II*	Particularly important buildings of more than special interest
II	Buildings of national importance and special interest

== Buildings ==
Name and location	Photograph	Date	Notes	Grade
St Giles Church; 53.25311°N 1.08559°W		12th century	A small church that has been altered through the centuries, it is rendered, with stone dressings and a lead roof. The church consists of a nave, a south porch, and a chancel. On the west gable is a bell turret, and on the southwest corner is a sundial. The south front of the nave has three semicircular arches containing windows with Y-tracery, and in the chancel are lancet windows.	II*
Manor House; 53.25321°N 1.08490°W		Late 17th century	A farmhouse that has been altered, it is in rendered limestone, with quoins, and slate roofs with stone coped gables and kneelers. There are two storeys, a double depth plan and a front of three bays. The central doorway has a moulded hood, and the windows on the front are casements, those in the upper floor with chamfered surrounds and cornices. Elsewhere, most of the windows are sashes.	II
Carburton Grange; 53.25133°N 1.08267°W		c. 1700	The house, which was altered in the early 19th century, is rendered at the front, in red brick at the rear, and it has a pantile roof. There are two storeys and three bays. In the centre is a doorway with an architrave, a traceried fanlight, a flat hood on brackets and side lights, and the other windows are sashes.	II
Carburton Bridge; 53.25442°N 1.07815°W		Mid 18th century	The bridge carries Limetree Avenue over the River Poulter, near the entrance to Clumber Park. It is in red brick with stone dressings, and consists of two round arches with keystones, cutwaters and coped parapets.	II
Carburton Lodges and gate piers 53.25339°N 1.07885°W		1789	The lodges and gate piers at the entrance to Clumber Park are in stone, the rear of the lodges are in brick, and the roofs are slated. The piers are rectangular, each is on a plinth, and has a blind round-headed niche, above which is a square block with swept sides supporting two steps and a ball finial. Each flanking lodge has a plinth and a pediment, and a round-headed blind arch containing a sash window, and on the outside is a lean-to.	II
Farm buildings, Manor Farm; 53.25248°N 1.08719°W	—	Early 19th century	A group of farm buildings around an open courtyard, in brick with stone dressings and pantile roofs. They consist of an L-shaped two-storey range and a single-storey range. The two-storey range has sides of ten and three bays, and the single storey range was originally an engine house. The windows have cast iron glazing bars with central hinged casements, and splayed lintels and sills in stone.	II
South Lodge; 53.24862°N 1.05957°W		1824	The lodge in Clumber Park is in stone, it was extended in red brick later in the 19th century, and has a slate roof with stone coped gables and moulded kneelers. There is a single storey and a T-shaped plan, with a front of three bays. The front is on a plinth, with moulded eaves and gutters. The middle bay projects and is gabled, it contains a canted bay window with chamfered mullions, and above it is a coat of arms. The doorway has a fanlight and a hood mould with the date.	II
