= Listed buildings in Clumber and Hardwick =

Clumber and Hardwick is a civil parish in the Bassetlaw District of Nottinghamshire, England. The parish contains 26 listed buildings that are recorded in the National Heritage List for England. Of these, one is listed at Grade I, the highest of the three grades, six are at Grade II*, the middle grade, and the others are at Grade II, the lowest grade. The parish contains Clumber Park, the grounds of the former Clumber Park House, and the settlement of Hardwick Village. The listed buildings in Clumber Park include the surviving range of the house, the stable range, a stable courtyard and former vicarage, the kitchen gardens and a palm house, a church, a bridge, two temples, a grotto, gateways and lodges. In the village are houses, farm buildings and a war memorial.

== Key ==
Grade	Criteria
I	Buildings of exceptional interest, sometimes considered to be internationally important
II*	Particularly important buildings of more than special interest
II	Buildings of national importance and special interest

== Buildings ==
Name and location	Photograph	Date	Notes	Grade
Gate piers and walls, Normanton Gate; 53.26487°N 1.02909°W		c. 1700	The gateway was moved to its present site at the entrance to Clumber Park from Shireoaks Hall in the early 20th century. The gate piers are square, in stone, with banded rustication. Each pier has a moulded base, rebated corners, and at the top is a cornice and a gadrooned swagged urn. On the outer sides are buttresses linking with the flanking walls that are in coped stone. These have shaped flat balusters with wooden rails, and square piers with concave pyramidal caps.	II*
Stable Courtyard and Vicarage; 53.26446°N 1.06313°W		18th century	The stable courtyard buildings at Clumber Park are in brick on a plinth, with a floor band, dentilled eaves and slate roofs. They form four ranges round a courtyard, with sides of 16 and 18 bays, and projecting corner pavilions. The main south range has a round-arched carriage entrance, and to its left is the former vicarage. This has two storeys and three gabled bays, the outer bays projecting, with a canted bay window with a parapet in the middle bay, and sash windows elsewhere. The central bays of the west and east ranges are pedimented, and in the north range is a gatehouse with a round-arched carriage entrance.	II
Sundial; 53.26426°N 1.06270°W		18th century	The pillar sundial to the south of the former vicarage in Clumber Park is in stone. It has a two-stage round plinth, on which is a cruciform shaft with relief panels, a cornice, and an octagonal cap. On the top is a bronze dial.	II
West stable range and wall 53.26417°N 1.06332°W		18th century	The stable range is in brick on a plinth, with stone dressings, dentilled eaves, and a hipped roof in Westmorland slate. There are two storeys and attics, and a symmetrical front of 15 bays, the middle bay projecting under a pediment. In the centre is a round-arched carriage entrance with an impost band and a keystone, containing traceried panelled gates. This is flanked by round-headed niches, and in the pediment is a Diocletian window. On the roof is a square clock tower with quoins, a moulded string course and cornice, and clock faces. This is surmounted by a cupola with round-headed openings, keystones and four pediments, and it has a leaded dome with a ball finial and a wind vane. The flanking wings contain sash windows, and in the projecting outer bays are dormers. Attached to the range is a turning court wall in brick with stone dressings and coping.	II
Clumber Bridge; 53.25787°N 1.07052°W		1763–70	The bridge carries Clumber Lane over Clumber Lake in Clumber Park. It is an ornamental bridge in stone, consisting of three unequal semicircular arches, with a balustrade on a dentilled cornice. The arches have reeded soffits, raised architraves, and projecting fluted keystones, and there are octagonal cutwaters. The abutment walls are splayed, and end in circular piers with moulded plinths and domed caps.	II*
Greek Garden Temple; 53.26410°N 1.05699°W		c. 1765	The garden temple in Clumber Park is in stone, and in the form of a Greek Doric hexastyle portico. It is on a plinth, and has six fluted columns, antae and a pediment. Inside is a coved panelled ceiling.	II*
Roman Garden Temple; 53.26609°N 1.06000°W	—	c. 1765	The garden temple in Clumber Park is in stone, and in the form of a Roman Doric distyle portico. It has a hipped lead roof, a triglyph frieze with guttae, and a cornice with rosettes. At the ends are round-headed windows, and inside is a coffered ceiling with a domed central bay.	II*
The Grotto; 53.25879°N 1.06990°W		c. 1765	The grotto in Clumber Park is in stone, on a plinth, with a moulded cornice. There is a single storey and a single bay. It has a central doorway, and on the front and sides are semicircular arches with projecting keystones.	II*
Kitchen garden, gates, palmhouse and vineries 53.26785°N 1.06344°W		Late 18th century	The kitchen garden at Clumber Park is enclosed on three sides by a brick wall with stone coping, it is 4 metres (13 ft) high, and there is a central dividing wall. In the centres of the dividing wall and the south wall are gateways flanked by brick piers, each with a cruciform plan, stone bands, and stone domes. On the north wall is a palm house added in 1897, with a semi-octagonal plan and flanked by lean-to vineries. The palm house has a low brick wall and a glazed cupola.	II
Drayton Gate; 53.26327°N 1.02857°W		1785–86	The gateway was moved to its present site at the entrance to Clumber Park in the 1820s. The piers flanking the entrance are in stone, with chamfered rustication and vermiculated panels, sills, lintels and coping. Each pier contains a round-arched recess, and at the top is a coat of arms and a pediment. The outer walls have semi-circular recesses with keystones, and there is a single square pier with a pyramidal cap.	II*
Trumans Lodge and gateway 53.27629°N 1.09451°W		1789	The pair of lodges to Clumber Park, flanking the gateway, are in stone, brick and rendering. In the centre is a round-headed arch with an impost band and keystones, over which is a cornice and a coped embattled parapet. The lodges are similar and each is on a plinth, with projecting quoins, an eaves band, and tile roof with stepped pedimented coped gables. There is a single storey and attics, and three bays, the middle bay projecting under a gable, containing a doorway with a segmental head and a keystone, above which is a casement window and a coat of arms and the date. The outer bays contain segmental-headed mullioned and transomed casements with keystones.	II
Pigeoncote, Hardwick Grange; 53.27096°N 1.04238°W	—	Late 18th to early 19th century	The pigeoncote is in rendered brick, with striated stone dressings, quoins, floor bands, an eaves band, and a pyramidal slate roof. There is a square plan, a single bay, and three stages. It contains segmental-headed windows, a blocked semicircular window, and a doorway. On the roof is a square cupola with windows and pigeon holes, a moulded cornice and a square ogee dome.	II
Bakehouse at The Aviaries; 53.25266°N 1.06347°W	—	Early 19th century	The former bakehouse and wash house is in pebbledashed brick, and has a slate roof, with deep eaves forming a verandah carried on timber posts. There is a single storey and three bays, with one end canted. At the canted end is a doorway and a hatch, and the windows are casements.	II
School House; 53.28010°N 1.04350°W		19th century	An ornamental cottage in Clumber Park, it is in rendered brick on a plinth, with a floor band, dentilled eaves, and a conical Westmorland slate roof. There is an octagonal plan, two storeys and three bays. On the south front are casement windows, those in the ground floor mullioned and transomed. The cottage is linked by a single bay to a later cottage, with two storeys and two bays.	II
19, 20, 21 and 22 Hardwick Terrace and outbuildings 53.27342°N 1.04509°W	—	Late 19th century	A row of four estate cottages in brick on a chamfered plinth, with stone dressings, a floor band, and a slate roof with shouldered coped gables. There are two storeys and a symmetrical front of eight unequal bays. The doorways have four-centred arched heads, and the windows are mullioned and transomed casements with hood moulds. The central bay is recessed, outside which on each side is a gabled bay containing two doorways, then two further bays, the outer one recessed and containing a doorway, and in the roof are four dormers. At the rear are outbuildings with a single storey and eight bays.	II
23, 24, 25, 26 and 27 Hardwick Terrace and outbuildings 53.27310°N 1.04477°W		Late 19th century	A row of five estate cottages in brick in a plinth, with stone dressings, lintel bands, and slate roofs. On the front are three gables, the middle one shaped, and all coped with kneelers. There are two storeys and five bays, the middle and outer bays projecting. The doorways have four-centred arched heads, and the windows are mullioned and transomed casements with hood moulds. At the rear is a row of single-storey outbuildings with three bays, the middle bay projecting.	II
28 and 29 Hardwick Terrace and outbuildings 53.27288°N 1.04522°W		Late 19th century	A row of three estate cottages in brick with diapering, on a chamfered plinth, with stone dressings and a slate roof. There are two storeys, and a T-shaped plan, with a front of three bays, the outer bays projecting with shouldered coped gables. In the centre is a doorway with a four-centred arched head flanked by casement windows, and above is a porch with a slate roof on curved timber brackets. Over this is a gabled dormer with a hood mould. The other windows are mullioned and transomed casements. At the rear is an outbuilding with a single casement window.	II
30, 31, 21 and 33 Hardwick Terrace and outbuildings 53.27272°N 1.04570°W		Late 19th century	A row of four estate cottages in brick on a chamfered plinth, with stone dressings, and a slate roof with shouldered coped gables, kneelers and finials. There are two storeys and attics, and a symmetrical front of eight unequal bays. The doorways have four-centred arched heads, and most of the windows are mullioned and transomed casements. In the centre are two doorways, outside which on each side is a projecting gabled bay, then two further bays, the outer one recessed and containing a porch. In the roof are four gabled dormers, and the gables have slit vents. At the rear is a row of single-storey outbuildings, the middle bay projecting.	II
Farm Buildings and Wall, Hardwick Grange; 53.27171°N 1.04505°W		Late 19th century	The farm buildings are in brick and timber with stone dressings, and slate roofs with coped gables and kneelers. They have one or two storeys, and consist of a west range of 22 bays, and four east wings at right angles, each with 13 bays, forming three courts. To the east is a brick boundary wall with stone coping, containing two pairs of chamfered timber gateposts with conical octagon caps.	II
Ha Ha and fountain, Hardwick Terrace; 53.27278°N 1.04507°W	—	Late 19th century	The ha ha is in coped stone and extends for about 150 metres (490 ft). In the centre is a projecting canted bay containing an octagonal stone fountain.	II
Remains of Lincoln Terrace, garden benches and dock 53.26664°N 1.05602°W		Late 19th century	The terrace on the north side of Clumber Lake in Clumber Park extends for about 60 metres (200 ft), and has a central landing stage, steps and flanking walls. It contains two pairs of garden benches, one pair semicircular with scrolled ends in the form of winged lions, the other pair with scrolled ends and lion's head finials, and all with marble seats and inlaid panelled backs. Beyond is a rectangular dock, in brick, with chamfered stone coping.	II
The Battery; 53.26362°N 1.06116°W	—	Late 19th century	The battery consists of a canted projection on the north side of Clumber Lake in Clumber Park. It is in stone, and encloses an earth rampart with stone end walls, and to the right are steps with flanking walls. The battery contains nine stands for cannonballs.	II
The Duke's Study and bow corridor 53.26394°N 1.06302°W		1879–80	The only remaining part of Clumber Park House, designed by Charles Barry, the rest of the house being demolished in 1938. It is in stone and brick on a plinth, with string courses, dentilled eaves, a cornice, a parapet and a hipped slate roof. There is a single storey and five bays. The front is bowed and contains fixed and French windows, over which are four semi-circular recesses with moulded soffits and reeded keystones. The bow corridor to the left, and the east front, each contain a doorway with a moulded surround and a sash window.	II
Church of St Mary the Virgin; 53.26478°N 1.06189°W		1886–89	The church was designed by G. F. Bodley, and is built in white stone re-used from a previous chapel, and red Runcorn sandstone, and has lead roofs. There is a cruciform plan, consisting of a nave, north and south transepts, a chancel, a baptistry, a Lady chapel, vestries, and a steeple at the crossing. The steeple has a tower with two stages, lancet bell openings, and four crocketed pinnacles, linked by flying buttresses to a pierced octagonal corona, above which is a spire with lucarnes.	I
The Chantry; 53.27377°N 1.04470°W		1912	A choir school, later a private house, in brick with stone dressings, a moulded floor band, bracketed eaves, and a tile roof. There are two storeys and attics, and four bays, the outer bays projecting with shouldered coped gables and finials. In the second bay is a doorway with a moulded surround, and a corbelled arched pediment containing a cartouche with an initial. The left bay contains a canted bay window with a parapet, the other windows are casements, and in the roof is a five-light dormer.	II
Hardwick War Memorial and screen wall 53.27440°N 1.04556°W		1918	The war memorial is in an enclosure by a road junction. It is 3.5 metres (11 ft) high, in Clipsham stone, and consists of a Calvary on an angular plinth on a single-stepped base. Behind it is a stone wall with a ramped centre and flanking short wall, all with triangular coping. On the plinth, base and wall are bronze plaques with inscriptions and the names of those lost in the two World Wars.	II
