= St Giles' Church, Carburton =

Church in Nottinghamshire, England

St Giles Church, Carburton
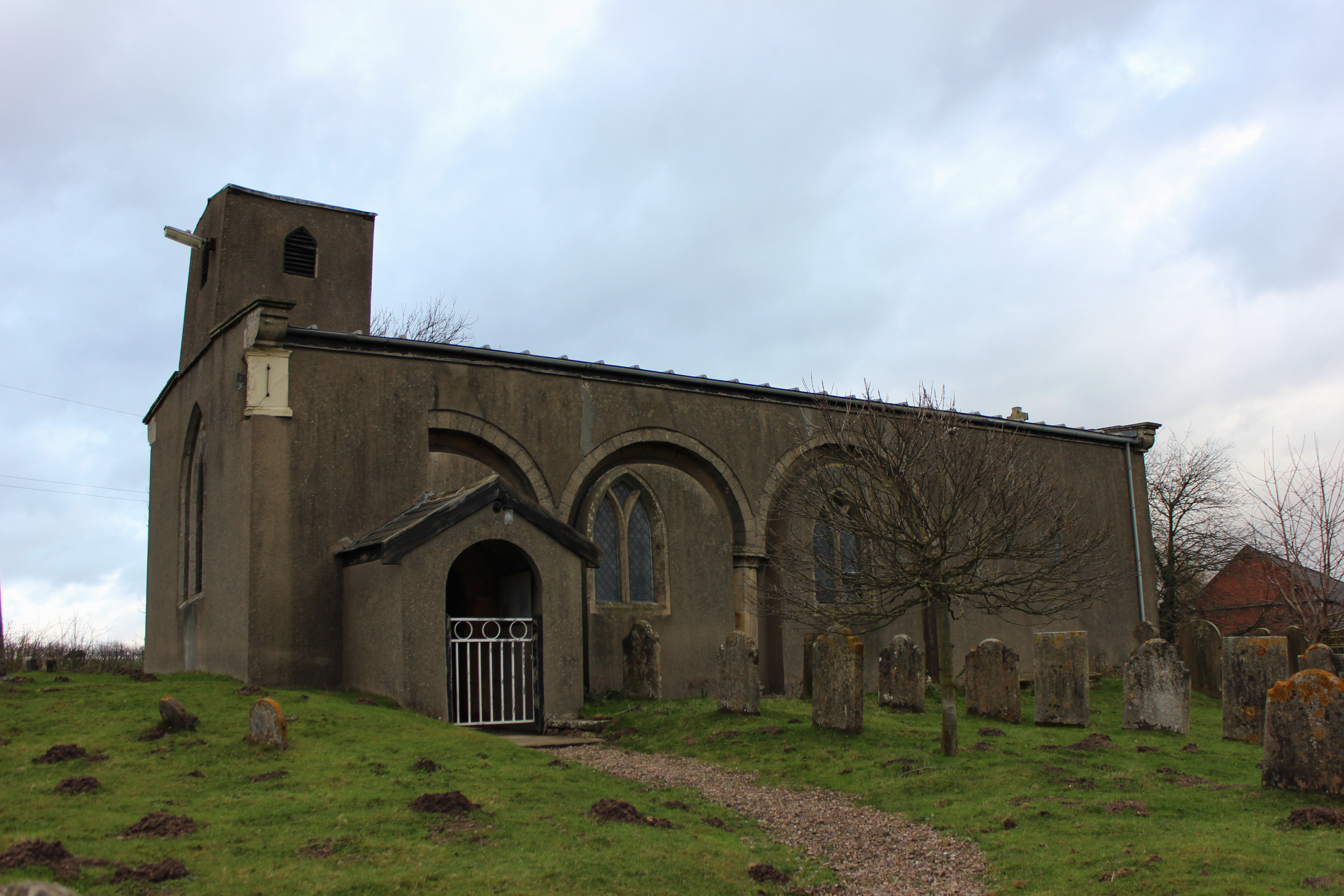
- St Giles Church
- St Giles Church, Carburton
- 53.2531°N 1.0856°W
- Denomination: Church of England
- Churchmanship: Anglo Catholic

History
- Dedication: St Giles

Architecture
- Functional status: Redundant
- Heritage designation: Grade II*
- Designated: 30 November 1966

Administration
- Province: York
- Diocese: Southwell and Nottingham but under care of provincial episcopal visitor, the Bishop of Beverley

St Giles Church is a redundant Anglican church in Carburton, Nottinghamshire.

== History ==
The church is an unusual shape and dates back to the early twelfth century; parish records date back to the 1530s.

The church is Grade II* listed by the Department for Digital, Culture, Media and Sport as it is a particularly significant building of more than local interest.

This church was declared redundant by the Church of England in 2018 and closed for worship. A notice in the porch now states that visits inside cannot be allowed as the building has been deemed unsafe.

== See also ==
- Grade II* listed buildings in Nottinghamshire
- Listed buildings in Carburton

== Gallery ==
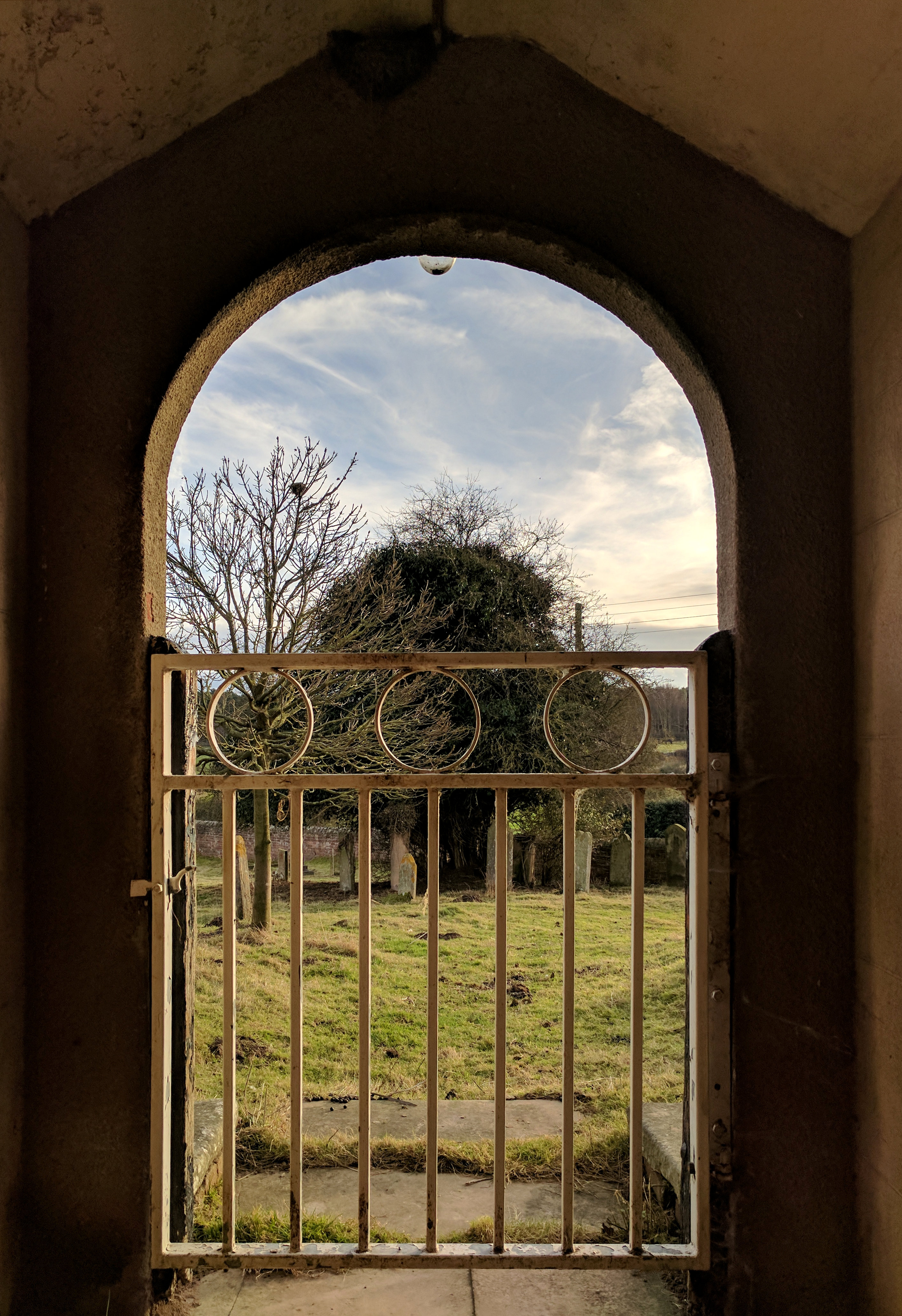
Church doorway

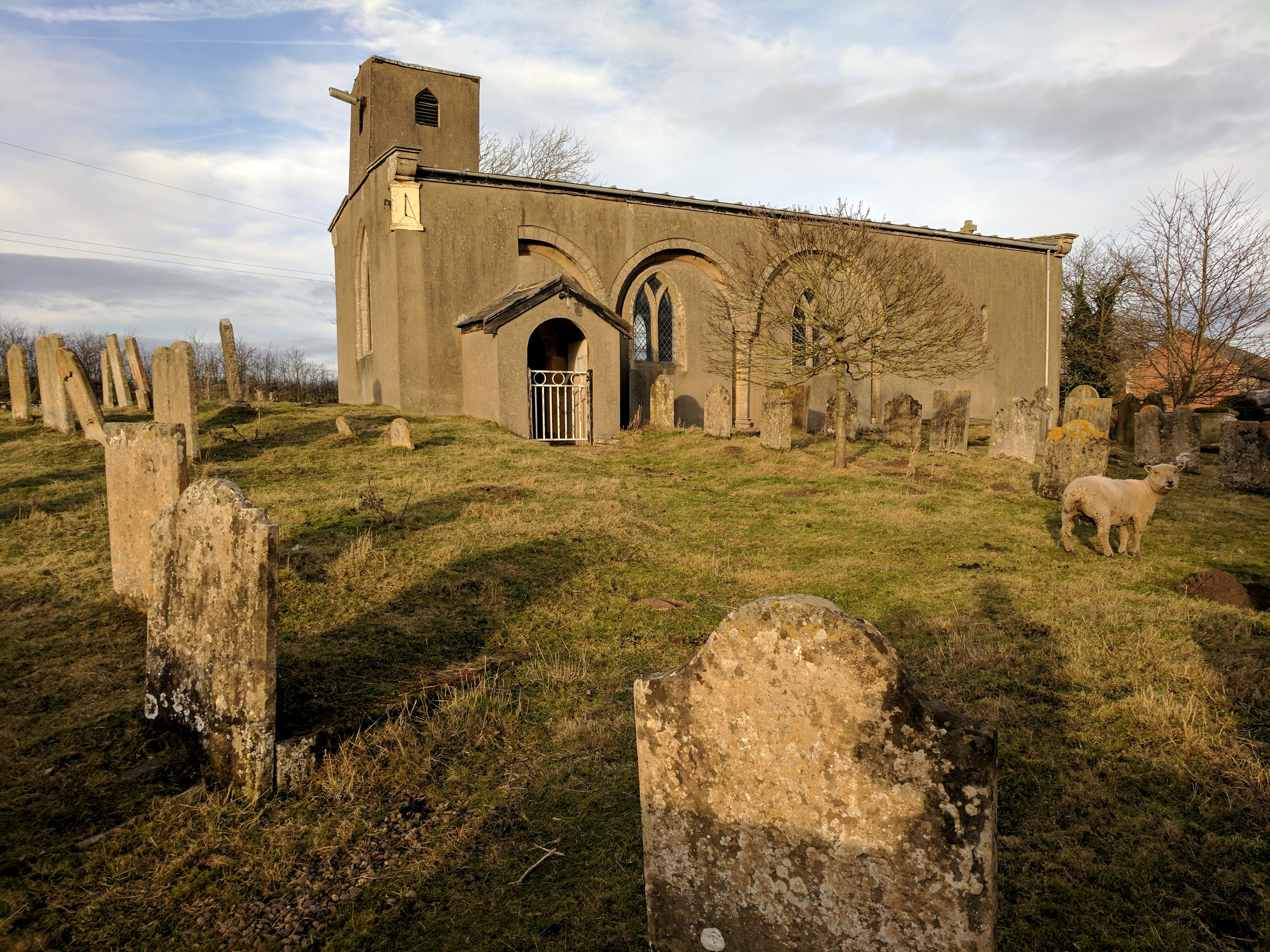
St Giles Church, Carburton and churchyard with sheep grazing

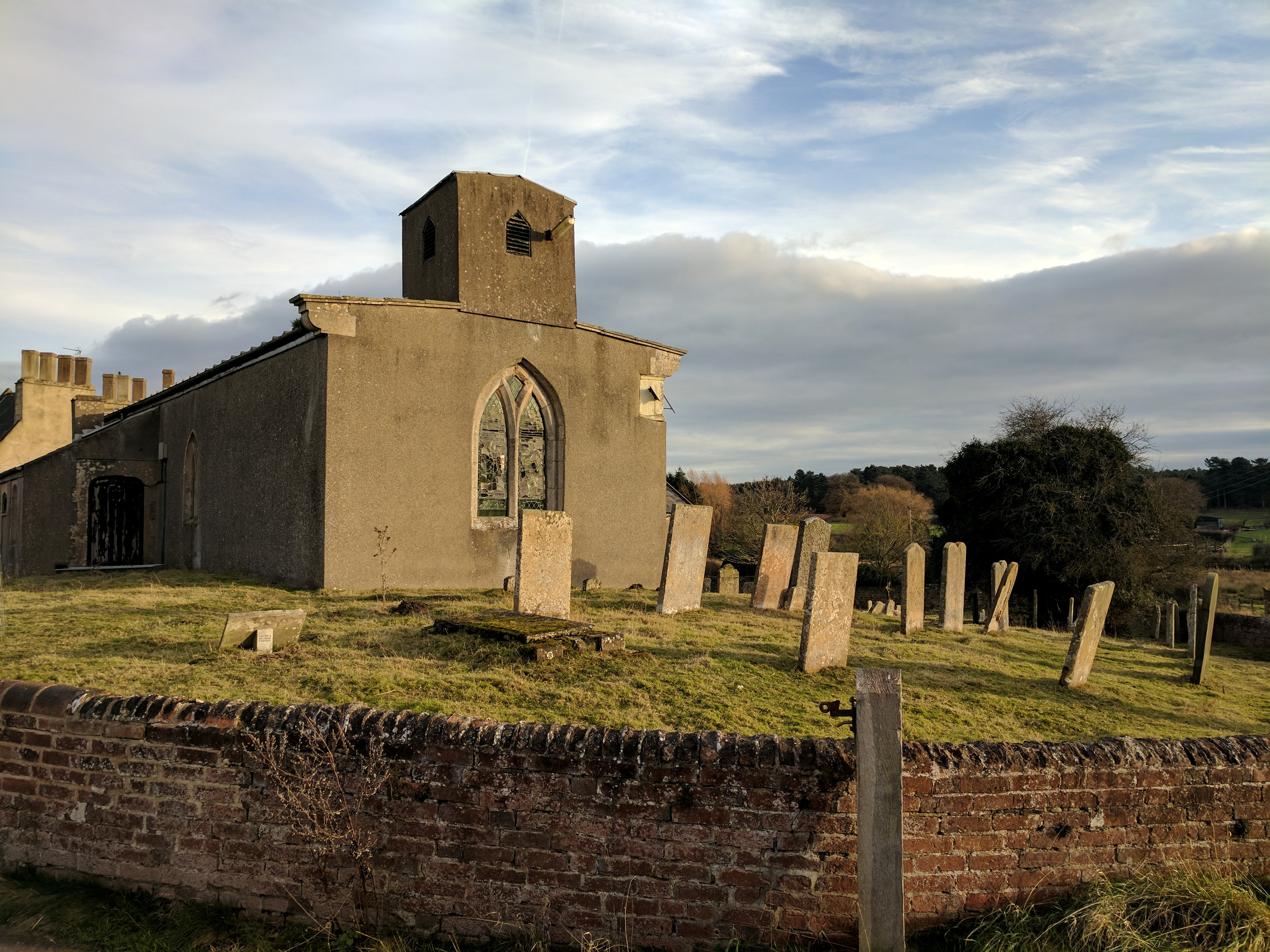
St Giles Church, Carburton

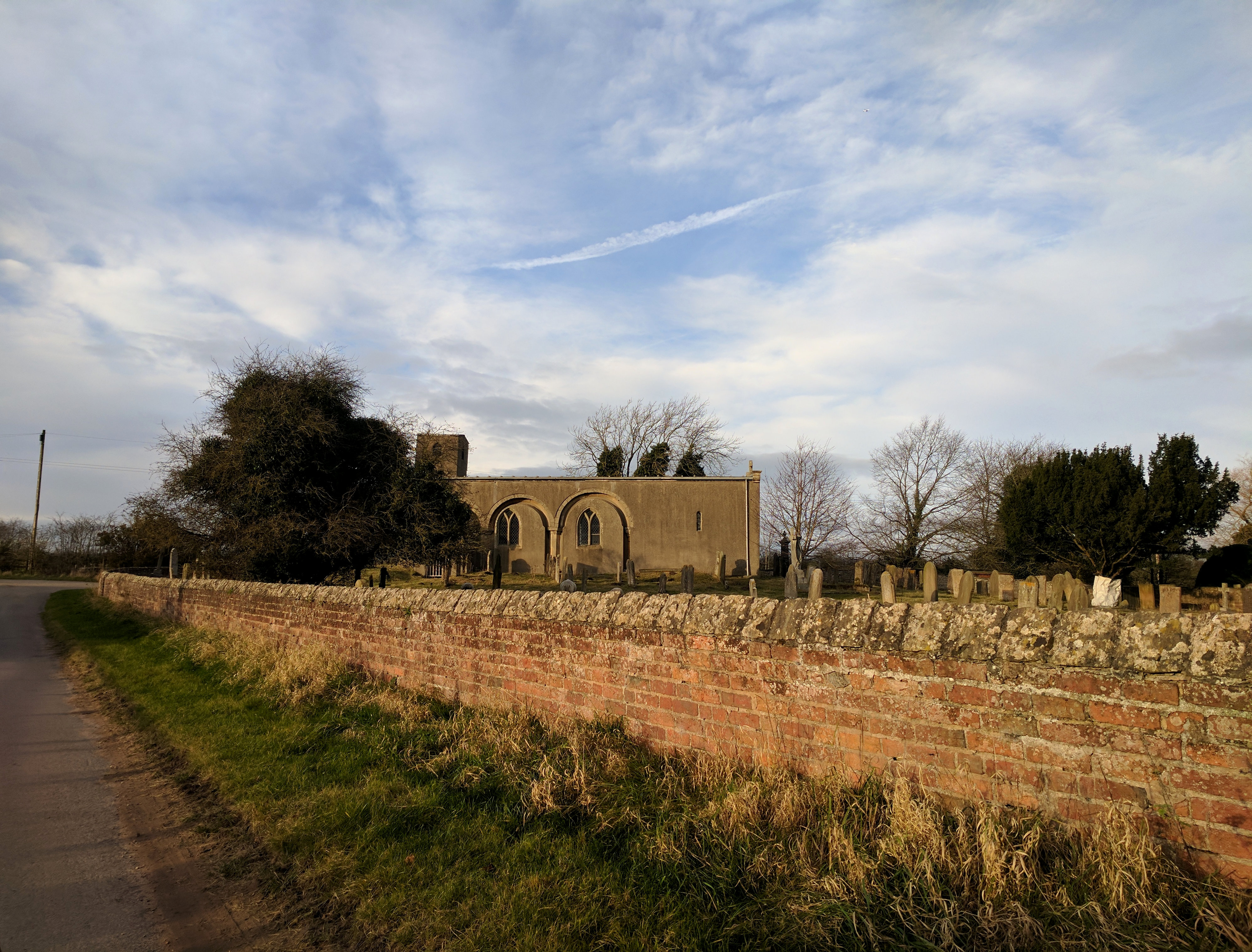
St Giles Church, Carburton

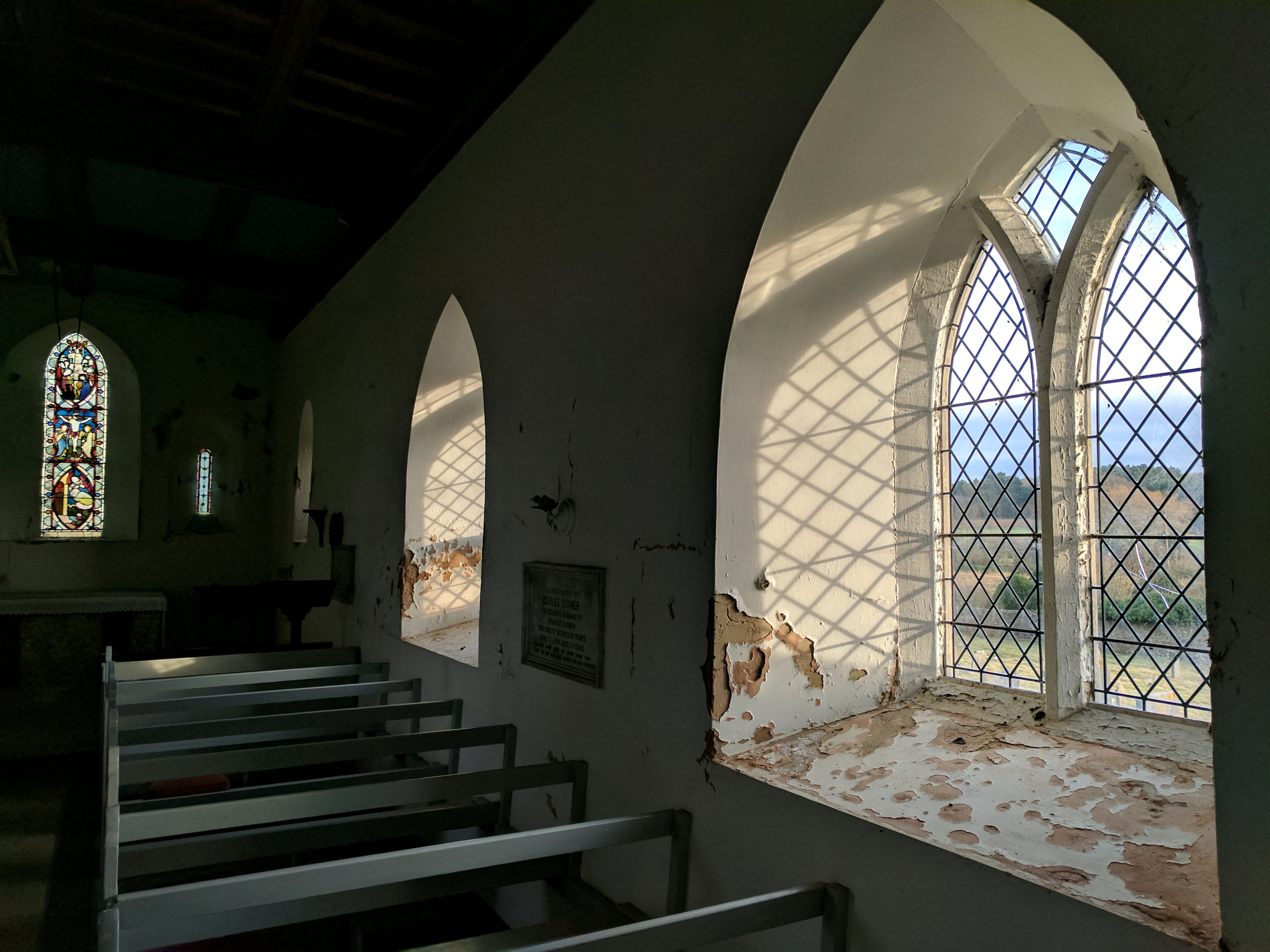
Interior of St Giles Church, Carburton

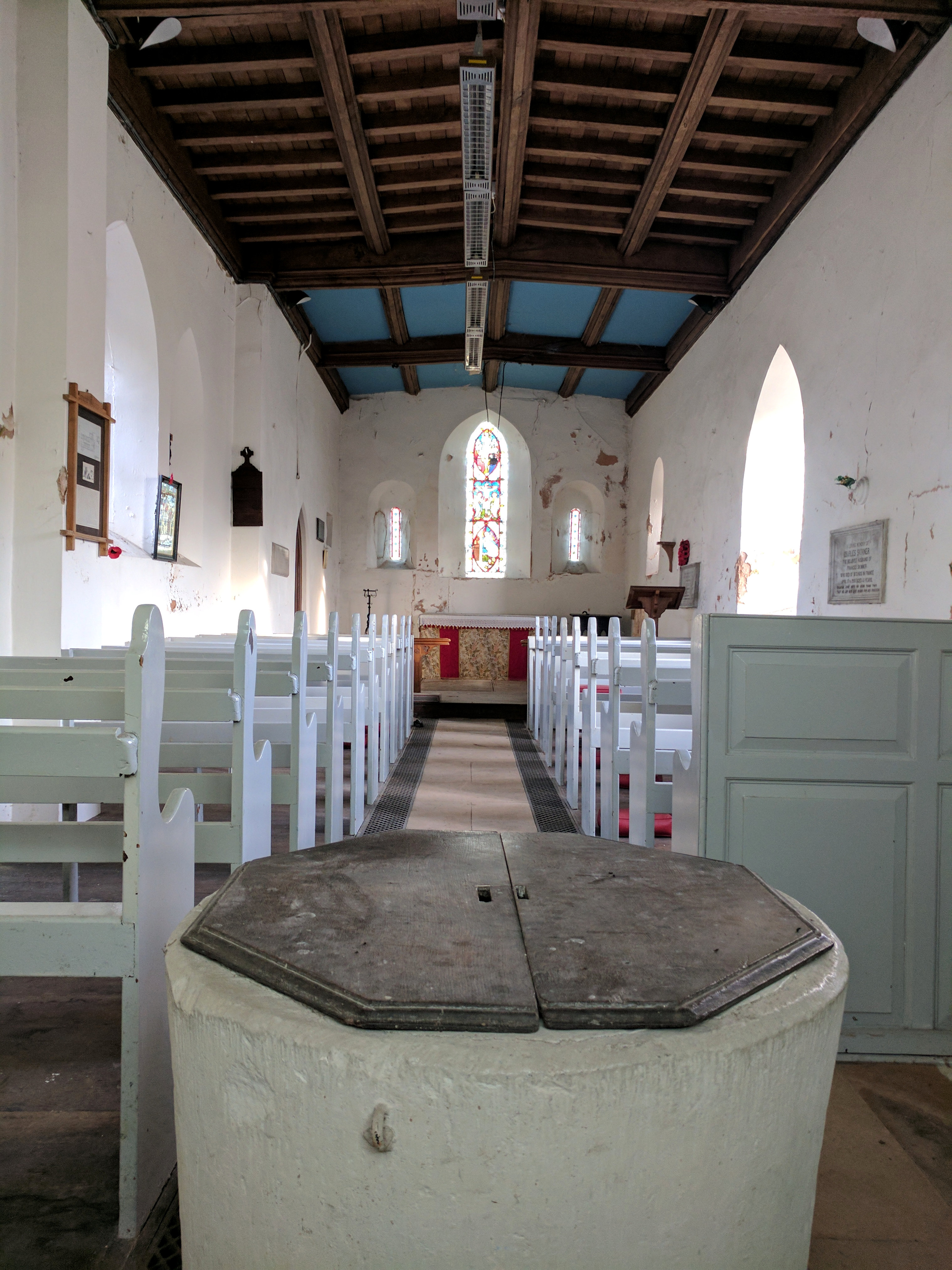
Interior of St Giles Church, Carburton (including baptismal font)

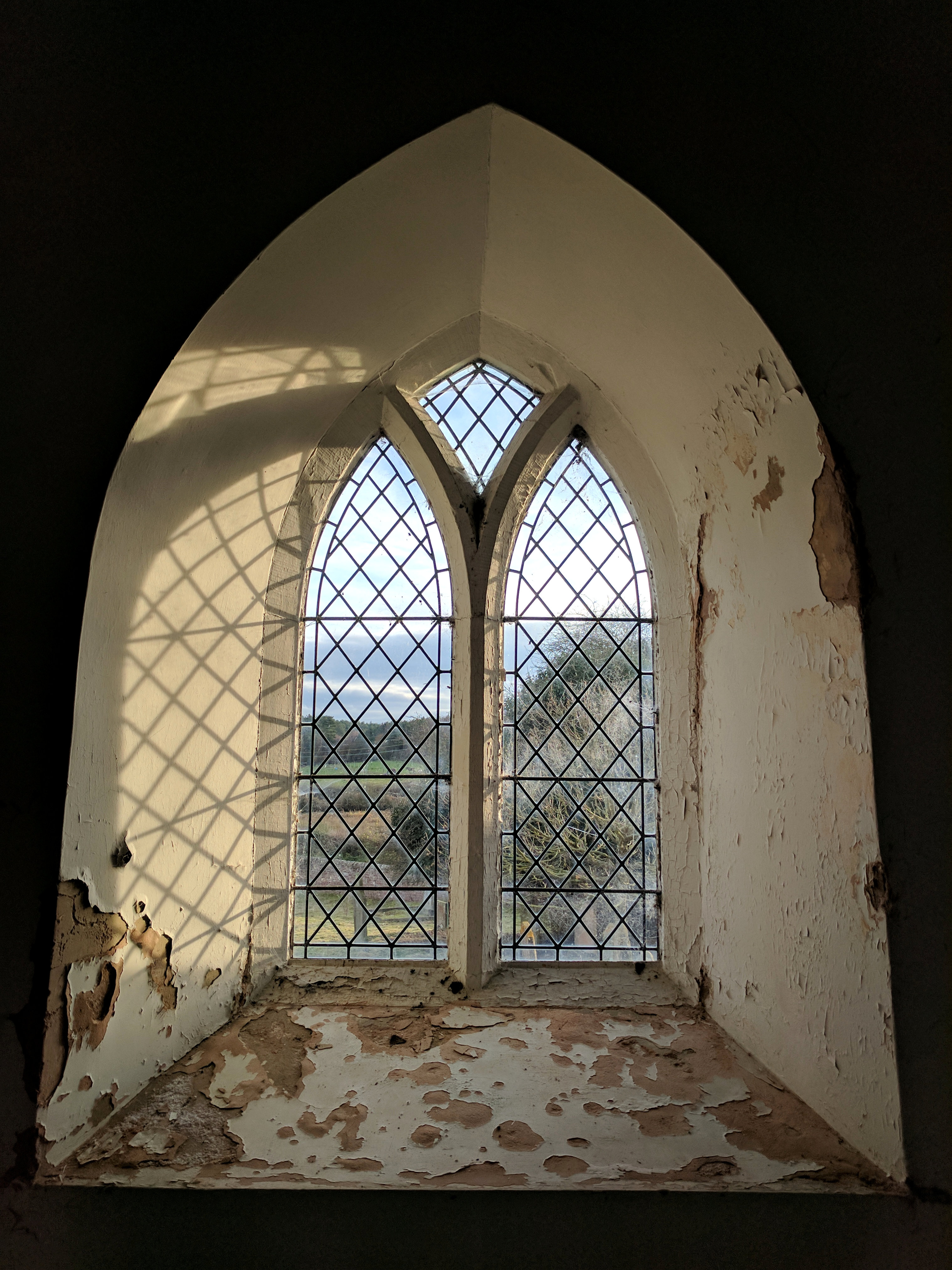
Interior of St Giles Church, Carburton

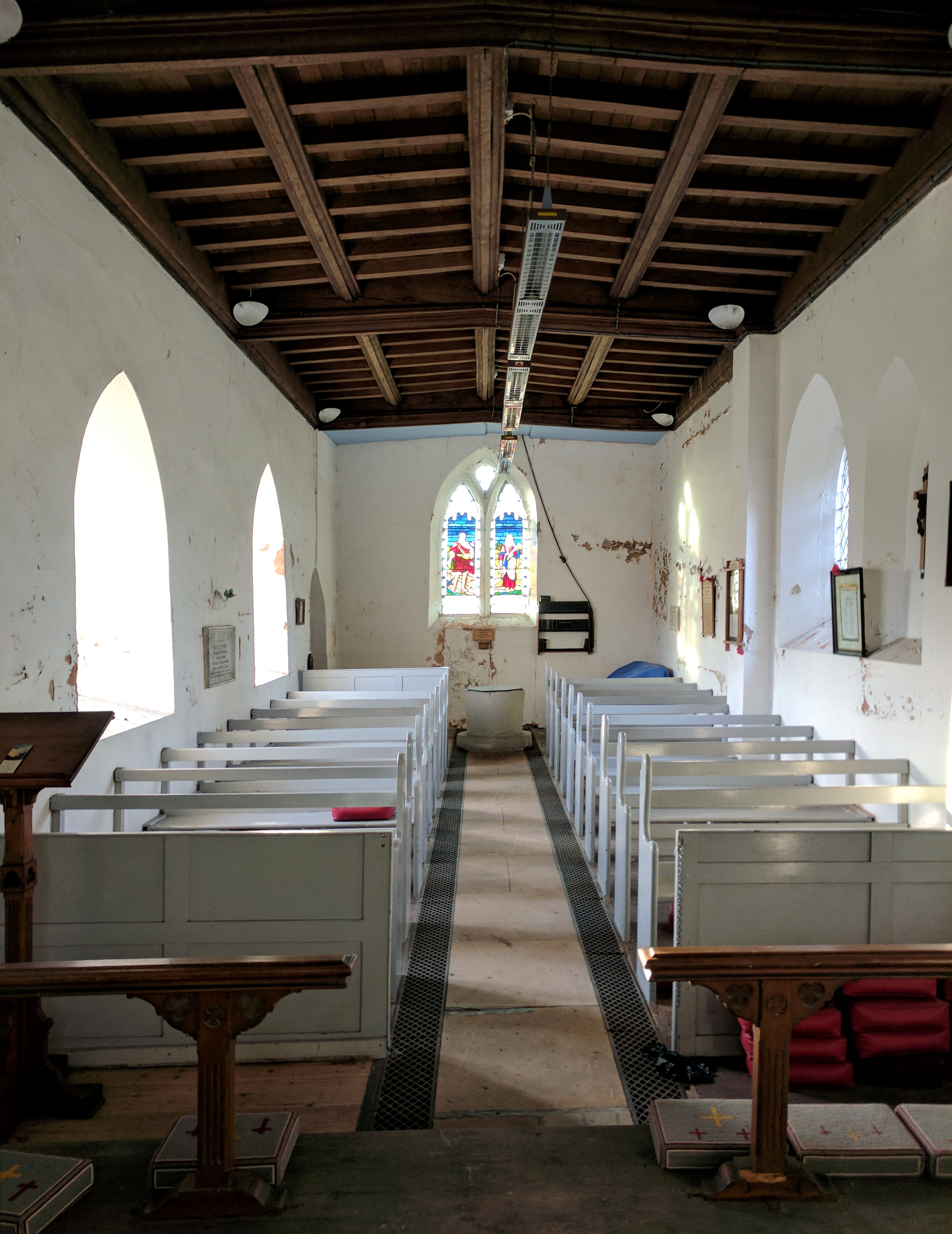
Interior of St Giles Church, Carburton

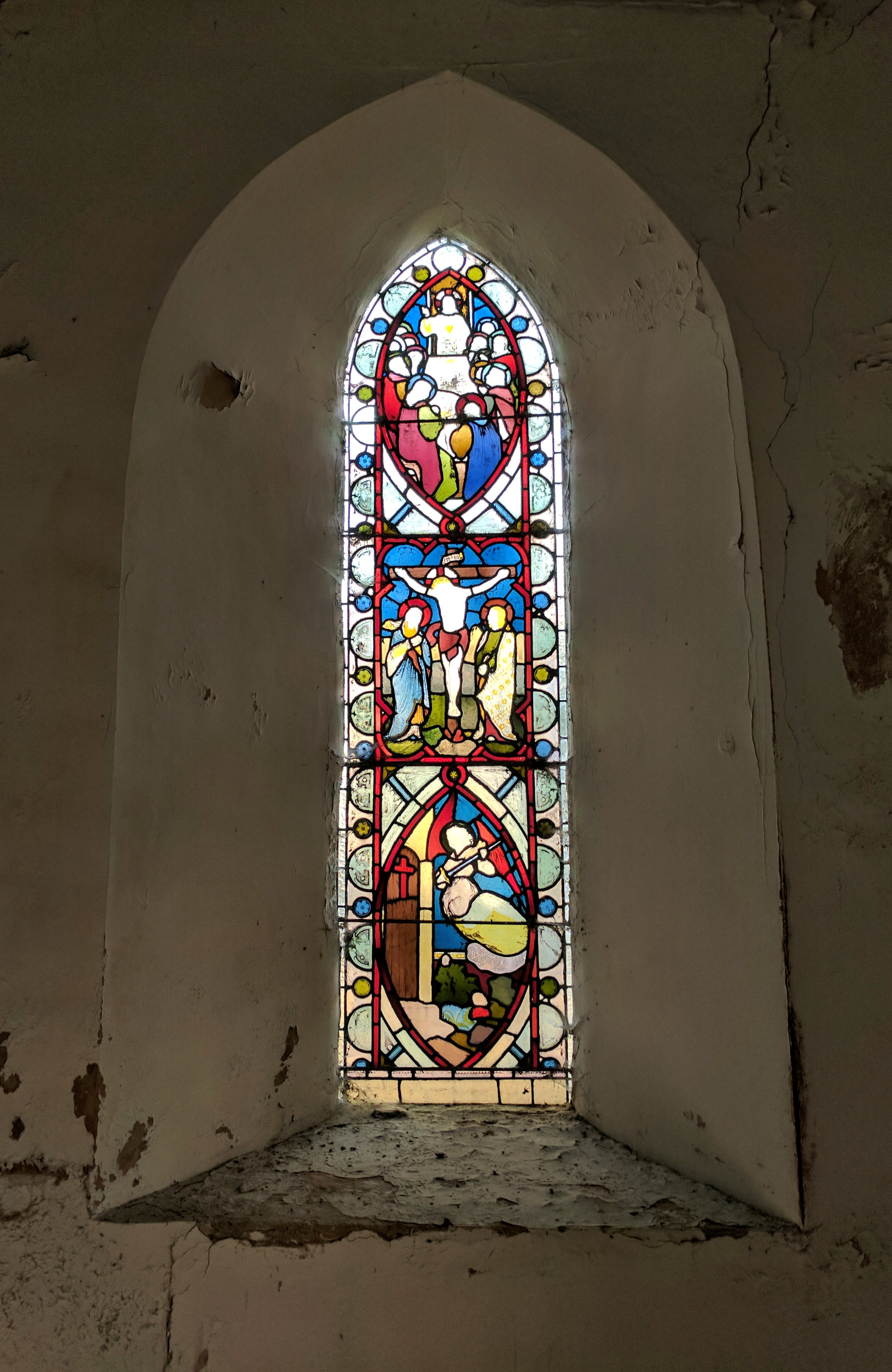
Interior of St Giles Church, Carburton

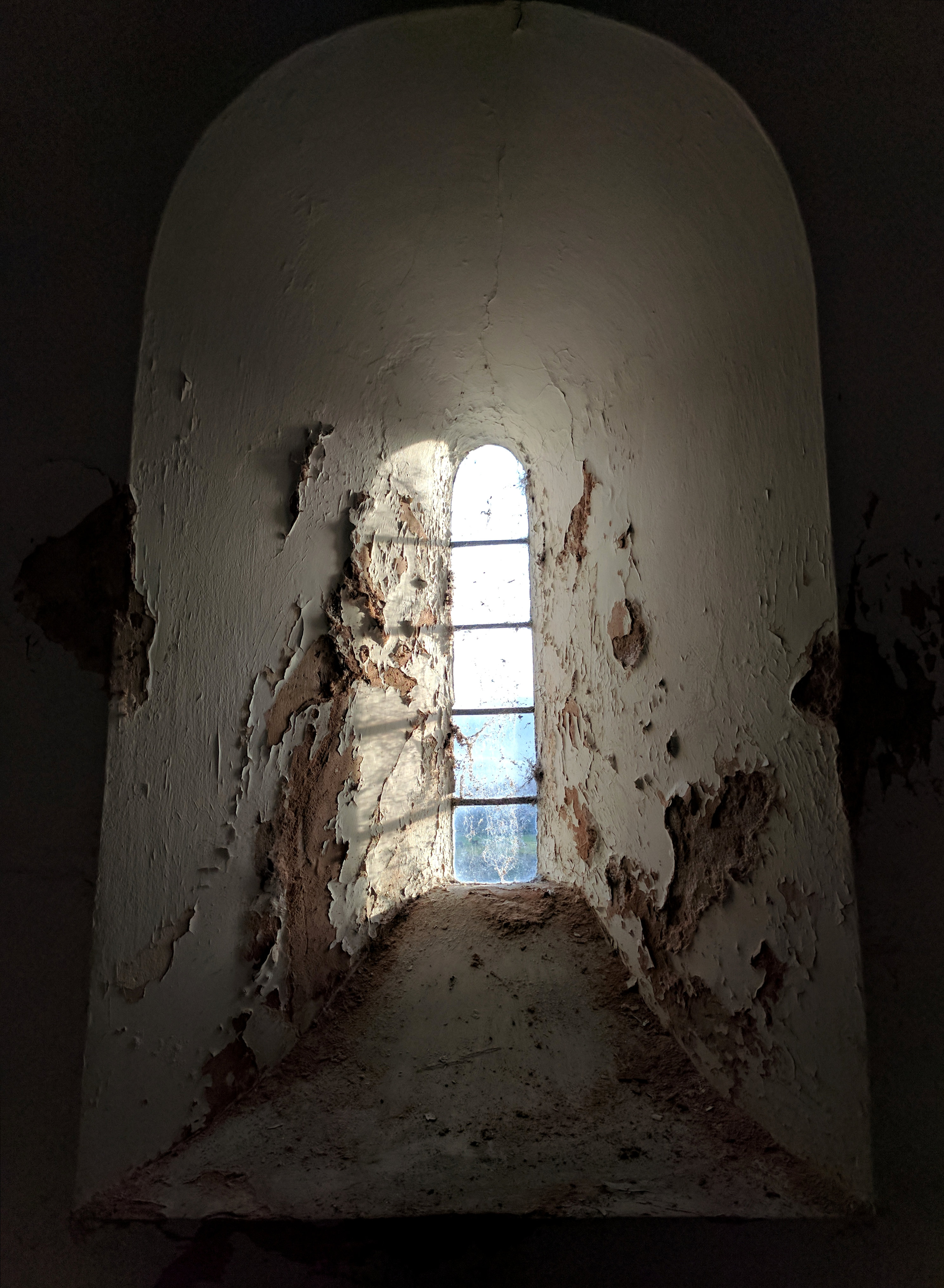
Interior of St Giles Church, Carburton

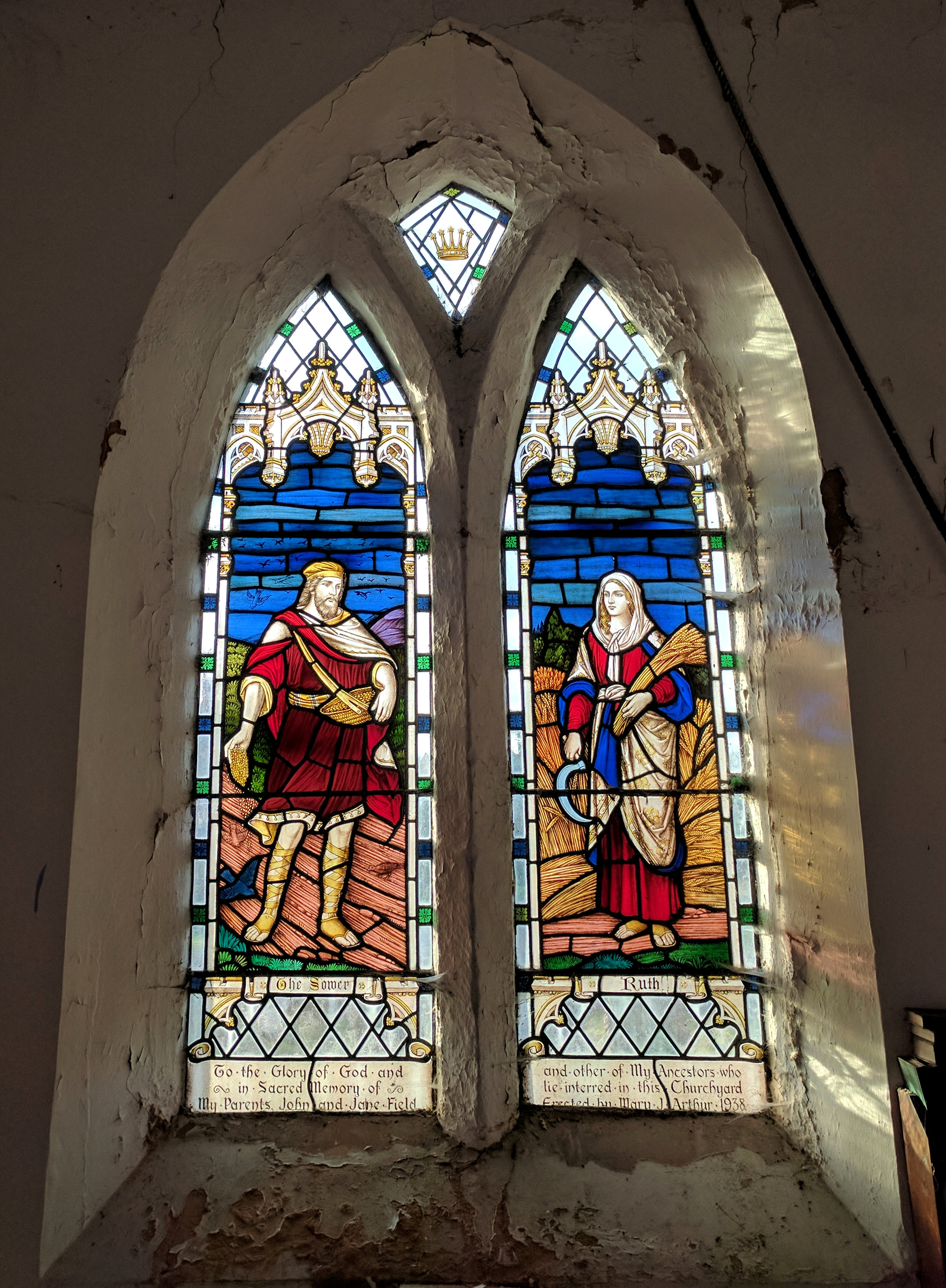
Interior of St Giles Church, Carburton
