= Clumber and Hardwick =

Civil parish in Nottinghamshire, England

Coordinates: 53°16′23″N 1°03′50″W

- Civil parish
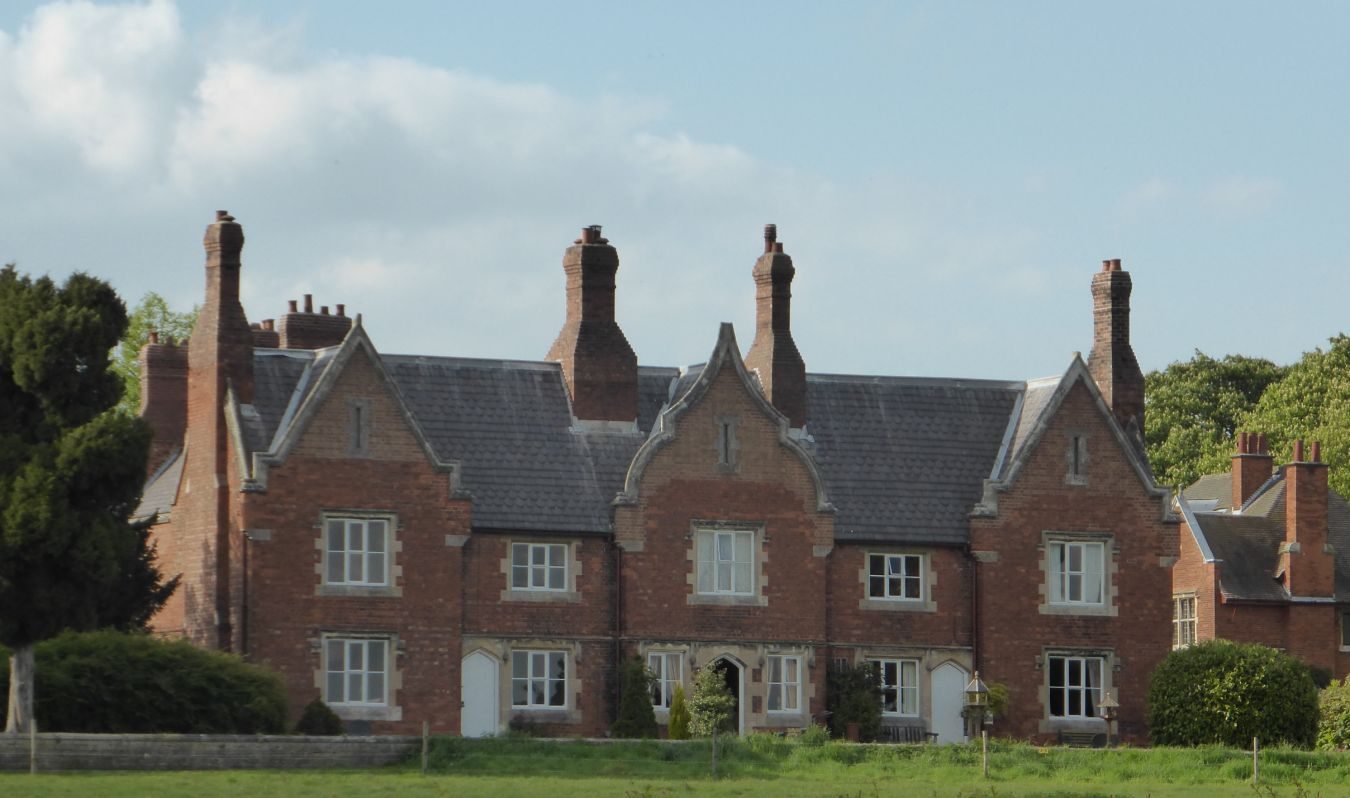
- Hardwick Village

- Location within Nottinghamshire
- Interactive map of Clumber and Hardwick
- Area: 5.35 sq mi (13.9 km^{2})
- Population: 66 (2021)
  - Density: 12/sq mi (4.6/km^{2})
- Created: 1994
- OS grid reference: SK 6375
  - London: 125 mi (201 km) SE
- District: Bassetlaw
- Shire county: Nottinghamshire
- Region: East Midlands
- Country: England
- Sovereign state: United Kingdom
- Settlements: Hardwick Village
- Post town: WORKSOP
- Postcode district: S80
- Dialling code: 01909
- Police: Nottinghamshire
- Fire: Nottinghamshire
- Ambulance: East Midlands
- UK Parliament: Bassetlaw

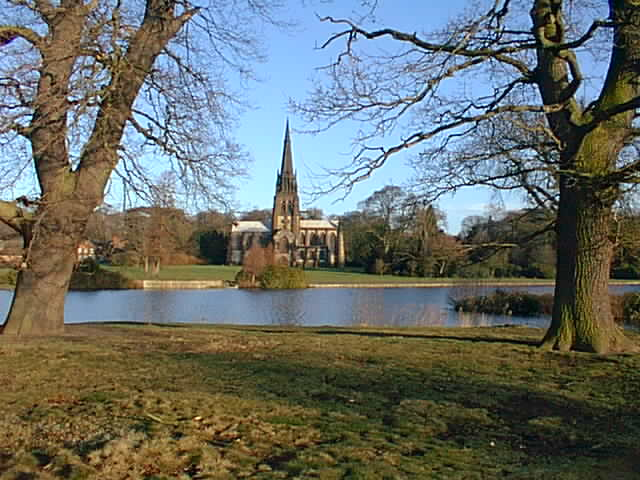
Church of St Mary the Virgin at Clumber Park

Clumber and Hardwick is a civil parish in the Bassetlaw district, in the county of Nottinghamshire, England. The parish includes the settlement of Hardwick Village and Clumber Park, a country park. In the UK census of 2021 the parish had a population of 66. The parish lies in the north west of the county, and south west within the district. It is 125 miles north west of London, 22 miles north of the city of Nottingham, and 3½ miles south east of the nearest market town of Worksop.The parish touches Babworth, Carburton, Elkesley, Perlethorpe cum Budby and Welbeck. The parish was formed on 1 April 1994. The area is within Sherwood Forest and has close historical associations with the Dukes of Newcastle, being part of a wider region known as The Dukeries. There are 26 listed buildings in Clumber and Hardwick.

== Geography ==
=== Location ===
It is surrounded by the following local areas:

- Worksop to the north
- Perlethorpe to the south
- Bothamsall and Elkesley to the east
- Carburton and Welbeck to the west.

The A614 Nottingham-Blyth road forms most of the east parish boundary. The park is primarily accessed by Limetree Avenue which branches from this main road and routes into Carburton, Apleyhead Lodge and arch at the north entrance of the avenue, is outside the boundary in Elkesley parish.

The parish consists of Clumber Park which takes up a large majority of the area, the central visitor facilities surrounding the church and gardens, and Hardwick Village which is 1 mile to the north east: Much of the population of 66 people are in Hardwick with a few sparsely scattered cottages and residences throughout the remainder of the parish.

==== Clumber Park ====
Clumber Park is the main portion of the overall parish. The area was formerly a ducal estate of the Pelham-Clinton family, also known as the Dukes of Newcastle, and is now owned by the National Trust. It is listed Grade I on the Register of Historic Parks and Gardens. The gardens and the estate are open to the public all year round. Due to being a visitor attraction, several facilities have developed around the former mansion area, reusing outlying auxiliary buildings.

==== Hardwick Village ====
This consists of former labourers' cottages and farms, including Hardwick Grange. The settlement was created by the landowners, the Dukes of Newcastle, in the later part of the 19th century to serve the park and estate of Clumber. It was designed on a picturesque, Neo-Elizabethan style, with an asymmetrical aspect designed to give the impression of a traditional village.

=== Landscape ===
As a country park, there are car parks and visitor facilities around the core estate area to the west of the lake. Predominantly, many of the parish residents are clustered around Hardwick village. Outside of these is a light scattering of farms, farmhouses, estate lodges and cottages amongst a wider mainly forested setting. There are some open fields in the east.

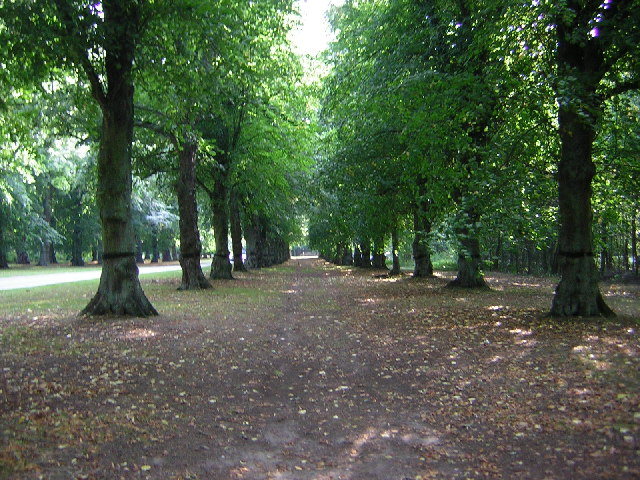
Limetree Avenue

==== Water features ====
- The River Poulter runs through the parish, passing the Hardwick village and Clumber
- Clumber Water is a lake formed from the river.

==== Land elevation ====
The parish is relatively low-lying. The land height ranges from 35 metres (115 ft) alongside the Clumber Water lake, and rises towards the west to a height of 75 metres (246 ft).

== Governance ==
Clumber and Hardwick although a parish, has no third tier council or parish meeting. The area is managed at the first level of public administration by Bassetlaw District Council, and Nottinghamshire County Council at its highest tier for oversight of local services.

== History ==
=== Toponymy ===
Clumber was Clunbre at the time of Domesday, and may have evolved from "a lump, a heavy clod of earth" or "a clump or patch of trees, plants.", referring to the state of the rough boggy ground that the area was composed of prior to the estate. Other derivatives include the elements of this name combining a stream-name, and probably the Celtic name for 'hill.' in this case the 'hill by the Clowne (river) but this is less likely.

Hardwick was "herd-farm", but was not recorded in Domesday.

=== Hardwick ===
This was an ancient hamlet of Worksop parish, but was not reported in the Domesday Book. It formed part of one of the two manors said to have existed in Clumber before the Norman Conquest. These came under the stewardship of Roger de Busli, and not long after were sub-infeuded, or at least much the area, to the family of Lovetot, together with the manor of Worksop. Richard de Lovetot, the son of the founder of the Priory of Worksop, William de Lovetot, by his charter confirmed the gifts of his father to that monastery, among other things, of "two bovates of land in Herthwik at Utware". A mill is noted in Domesday as pertaining to one of the manors at Clumber. Matilda de Lovetot, the heiress of the family, continued the grant of her ancestors with "the whole village of Herthwik."

In the 14th century reign of Edward I, a charter of free warren was granted to the Priory. Nothing further appears to be known of Hardwick's history until the time of the Dissolution of Monasteries, during the reign of Henry VIII, when it is mentioned with property at Osberton, with which it was removed from their ownership, along with Clumber and Haughton, Hardwyk Graunge and Clumber Graunge. These two latter granges may have been the two old Saxon manors, and were granted to Robert Dighton, who shortly afterwards obtained a licence to transfer Hardwick Grange and woods, with all houses in Osberton and Hardwick, and Worksop, to Richard Whalley. Eventually it came into the hands of William Holles, with it passing down to his eventual descendant John Holles, 1st Duke of Newcastle, and formed a part of the estates of Haughton and Clumber. From here its history was shared with Clumber. The later Dukes, from a humane consideration for their labourers, many of whom lived at a distance, erected a group of cottages in the 1850s. A school was later built in 1880 and was in use until 1932.

=== Clumber House ===
White's Directory in 1853 describes the appearance of the area within the 18th century as follows: "About a hundred years ago, it was one of the wildest tracts of Sherwood Forest, being then little more than a black heath full of rabbits, having a narrow river running through it, with a small boggy close or two.". The area formed part of Sherwood Forest until 1707 when licence was given to the 1st Duke of Newcastle of nearby Welbeck Abbey to enclose it as a deer park for the queen's use. A ducal hunting lodge was subsequently built by the river.

==== The First Clumber House ====
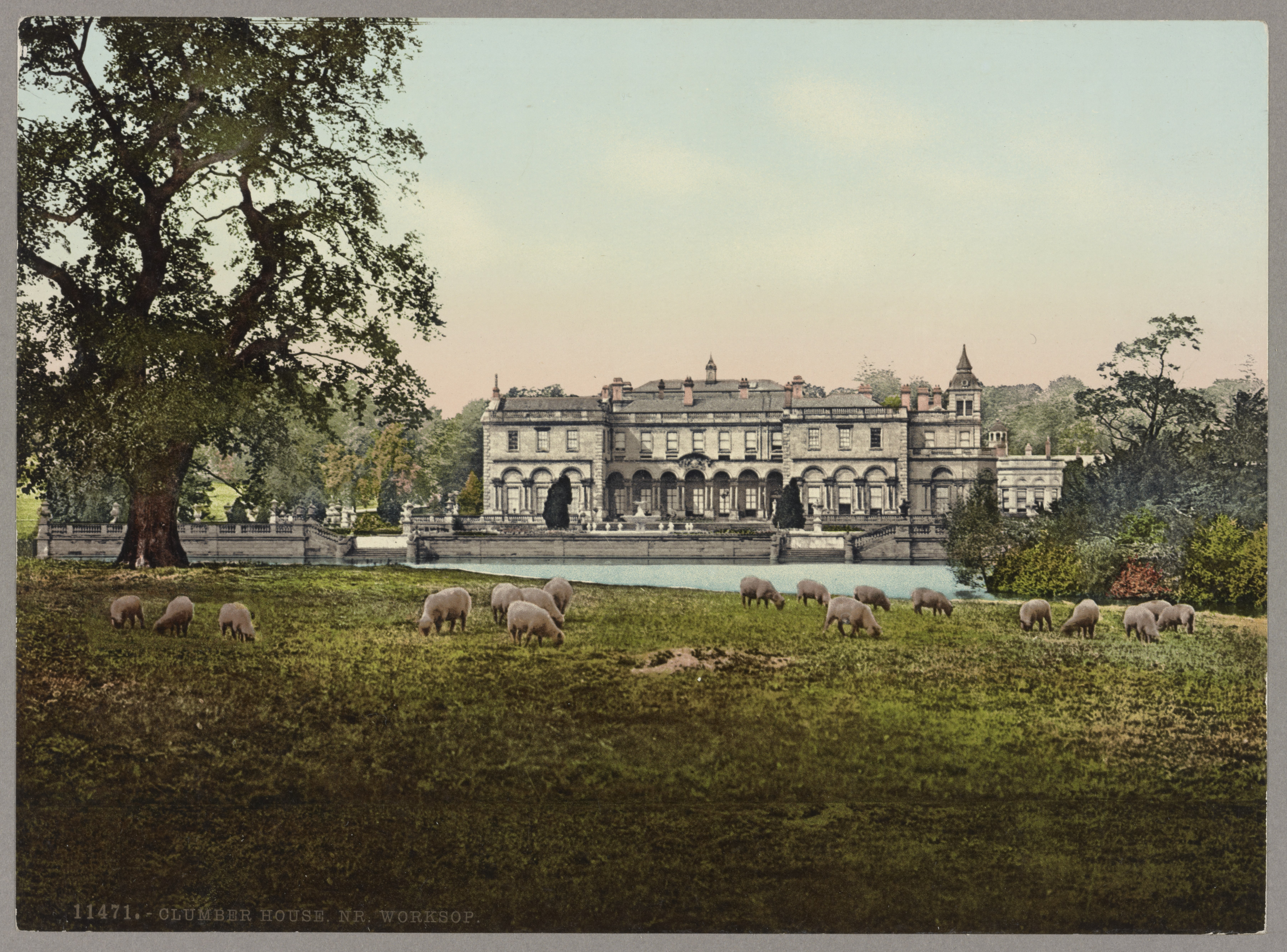
Clumber House

The first house at Clumber was built by Henry Pelham-Clinton, 2nd Duke of Newcastle, a distant relation of John Holles, in c.1760–70. The central core of the house was the original ducal hunting lodge. It was built around this with red brick, the architect being Stephen Wright. The house comprised this large central block with four wings. The large serpentine lake was created 1774–89, and beside it a Greek temple, and a three-arched stone bridge and cascade (1763). There was also built a Roman Doric seat alcove and a grotto (1765–67), along with a series of five gates designed by Wright. The longest double avenue of lime trees in Europe, created by the 5th Duke of Newcastle and extending for more than two miles, was planted in 1840 and named Limetree Avenue. In 1879 a fire burnt down much of the core of the house.

==== The Second Clumber House ====
The central part of the house was rebuilt (1879–80), to an Italianate style by Charles Barry Jr. At the height of its extent in 1910, Clumber Park covered 3,400 acres and was eleven miles in circumference The lake covered 87 acres and 'had two vessels floating on it'. A further fire at the house happened in 1912. The estate deteriorated and in 1937 there was a series of sales which included the antique garden ornaments. The house was demolished in 1938 in anticipation of inheritance taxes, with the then heir The Earl of Lincoln originally planning to build a new house at Clumber, however this was abandoned when the park was requisitioned by the Army during the Second World War and used as an ammunition dump and a test area for trench-digging machines.

=== Post WWII ===
The building material of Clumber House and many of the contents, including the library and rare manuscripts, were sold to raise money. The grounds were also put up for sale and purchased by the National Trust in 1946. The sole surviving part of Barry's work is the 'Duke's Study' near the lake, with bay windows flanked by pilasters, which is now used as a café. Also surviving are the 18th and 19th century stables and the 18th century brick coach house with central pediment and cupola over the arch. The surviving park and outbuildings such as the chapel, kitchen garden, gates and bridge are intact and mainly are listed structures. The Clumber and Hardwick locations until 1974 were a part of Worksop ancient parish, which was abolished and became a part of the newly formed Bassetlaw district unparished area. In 1994, Clumber and Hardwick was established as a standalone parish.

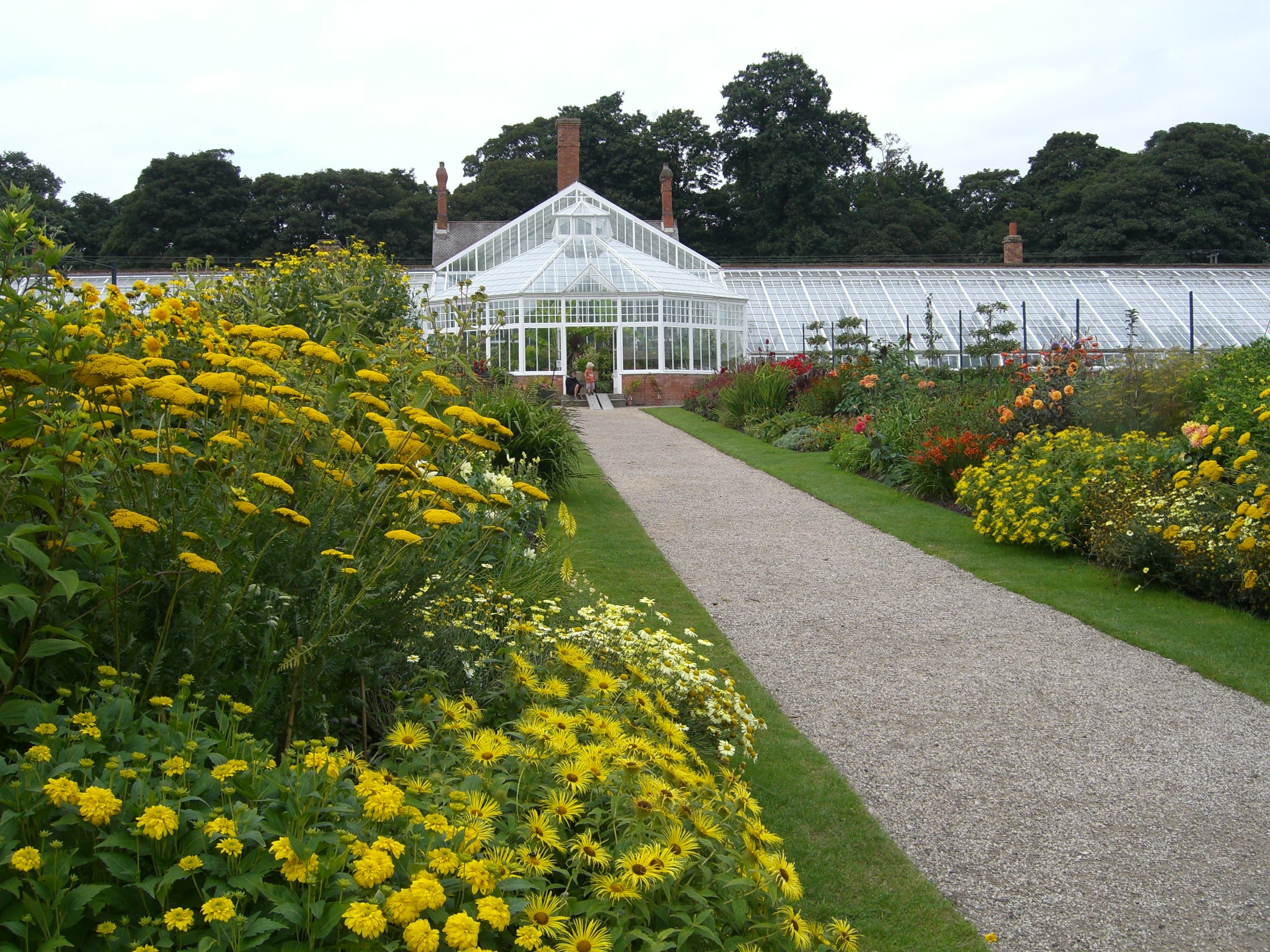
Walled Kitchen Garden

== Economy ==
Clumber Park is presently run as a non-profit visitor attraction by the National Trust, utilising the auxiliary buildings from the estate. As landowner, they also run Hardwick Village as a commercial entity. Amenities surrounding the former Clumber House area include:

- Chapel
- Woodland Play Area
- Cycle Hub
- Discovery Centre
- Garden Tea House
- Central Bark Cafe
- Pleasure Grounds
- Walled Kitchen Garden

There is a campsite north of Limetree Avenue.

Hardwick Village is primarily a working agricultural area with several tenanted residential buildings. It offers some visitor facilities.

== Landmarks ==
The long distance Robin Hood Way path runs past both the core visitor area and Hardwick village.

Route 6 of the National Cycle Network passes through the park linking it to Sherwood Forest and Sherwood Pines.

=== Listed park ===
Clumber Park is registered as Grade I on the National Register of Historic Parks and Gardens.

=== Listed buildings and locations ===
Over 20 buildings and structures throughout the parish are listed as features of historical interest, including:

- St Mary's Church (Grade I)
- Clumber Bridge (Grade II*)
- Several small structures such as gates and miniature temples at Grade II*
- Hardwick War Memorial (Grade II)

== Religious sites ==
There is one church in the core visitor area, the Church of England parish church of St Mary the Virgin. It was built in the late 19th century for the Duke and estate.

== Sport ==
There is a cricket ground and local club based near the Clumber House area.

== External sites ==
- Clumber and Hardwick video journal
- National Trust site - Clumber Park
