= Carburton =

Village in Nottinghamshire, England

Coordinates: 53.25204°N 1.08391°W

- Village and Civil parish
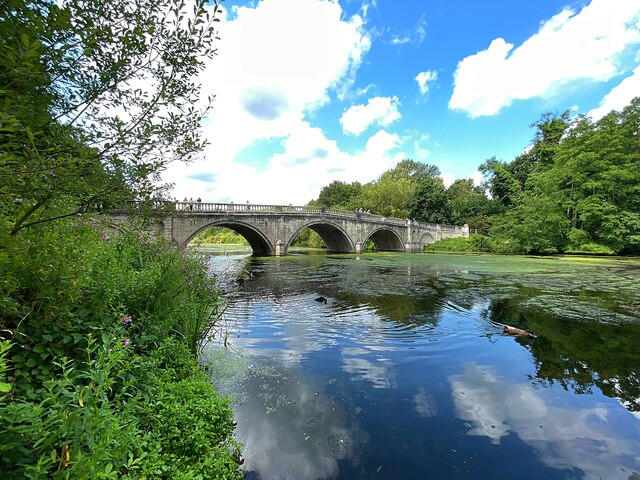
- Carburton Bridge

- Location within Nottinghamshire
- Interactive map of Carburton
- Area: 3.55 sq mi (9.2 km^{2})
- Population: 69 (2021)
  - Density: 19/sq mi (7.3/km^{2})
- OS grid reference: SK 605729
  - London: 125 mi (201 km) SE
- District: Bassetlaw
- Shire county: Nottinghamshire
- Region: East Midlands
- Country: England
- Sovereign state: United Kingdom
- Post town: Worksop
- Postcode district: S80
- Dialling code: 01909
- Police: Nottinghamshire
- Fire: Nottinghamshire
- Ambulance: East Midlands
- UK Parliament: Bassetlaw

Carburton or Carberton is a small village on the west side of Clumber within the Bassetlaw district of Nottinghamshire, England. It is primarily rural and residential. The church of Saint Giles is an unusual shape and dates back to the early 12th century, parish records date back to the 1530s

Carburton stands on the River Poulter, on the Ollerton Road and is very close to Clumber Park. It is surrounded by four major cities, those being Doncaster, Lincoln, Sheffield and Nottingham, which is around 24 miles (39 km) away. Whilst London is 154 miles (248 km) away via the M1.

== History ==
In 1848 it was written that Carburton was part of the Hatfield. division of the Bassetlaw wapentake north division of the county of Nottingham situated about 4 miles (6.4 km) SSE from Worksop. The township contained 193 inhabitants and 1,516 acres of land. The Duke of Portland was the sole owner and lord of the manor, however the Duke of Newcastle owned about 40 acres, which was inclosed in Clumber Park.

In 1853 it was written that the chapelry included Carburton Forge, a small hamlet, one mile west of the village, where there was previously an iron forge.

The chapel that is located in Carburton is dedicated to Saint Giles and is believed to date back to the Saxon period. However church records show the Anglican parish register dates from 1537 for baptisms, and 1540 for marriages and burials.

Population change in Carburton from 1881 to 1961

== Population ==
=== 1881 Census – 1961 Census ===
Data from the 1881 Census shows that the population was 191 in 1881, which then decreased by about 35 in the 1891 Census. The population continued to decrease with the 1911 Census revealing a population density of 141. However data from the 1921 Census shows a population increase to 150, with 71 males and 77 females. By the 1931 Census the population had fallen again by 2 to 148, but the 1951 Census shows a drastic decrease with a population of 108. By the 1961 Census the population had fallen to 101, with 54 males and 47 females.

=== 2001 Census ===
The 2001 Census recorded that only 75 people lived in Carburton, with males making up the majority of 45 residents and females numbering 30.

=== 2011 Census ===
The 2011 Census again recorded that the population of Carburton remained less than 100. Details were included in the adjacent civil parish of Clumber and Hardwick.

=== 2021 Census ===
The 2021 Census recorded that only 69 people live in Carburton. Males continue to make up the majority of the residents with 37 reported, while 32 women were recorded.

== Industry ==
The 1881 Census reveals that majority of males were working in the primary and secondary sector, with over 30 males working in agriculture, 6 in housing, decoration and furniture and 5 working with animals. Whilst the majority of females (37) are in an unknown occupation, however 5 females work in domestic services and offices and 2 work as professionals.

== Housing ==
The number of houses in Carburton from the 1881 Census to the 1961 Census has fluctuated throughout the years. The 1881 Census records a total number of 38 houses in the area, but this figure had fallen to 32 in the 1921 Census. Ten years later the 1931 census records a rise in houses to 37, but over a twenty-year period there is another sufficient decrease in houses to 32. However the 1961 Census shows a record high, with 41 houses.

In 2011 house prices in the Bassetlaw district ranged from £32,000 to £387,500, whilst in 2012 both the lowest and highest prices of houses had increased, now ranging from £57,000 to £400,000.

== Clumber Park ==
What was once the country estate of the Duke of Newcastle is now a National Trust park that allows a glimpse to its past as well as being a haven for wildlife. Its extensive gardens, woodlands and lake cover 3,800 acres, creating a relaxing environment for family and friends. Although the house no longer exists, there are experiences which allow you to explore its grand past.

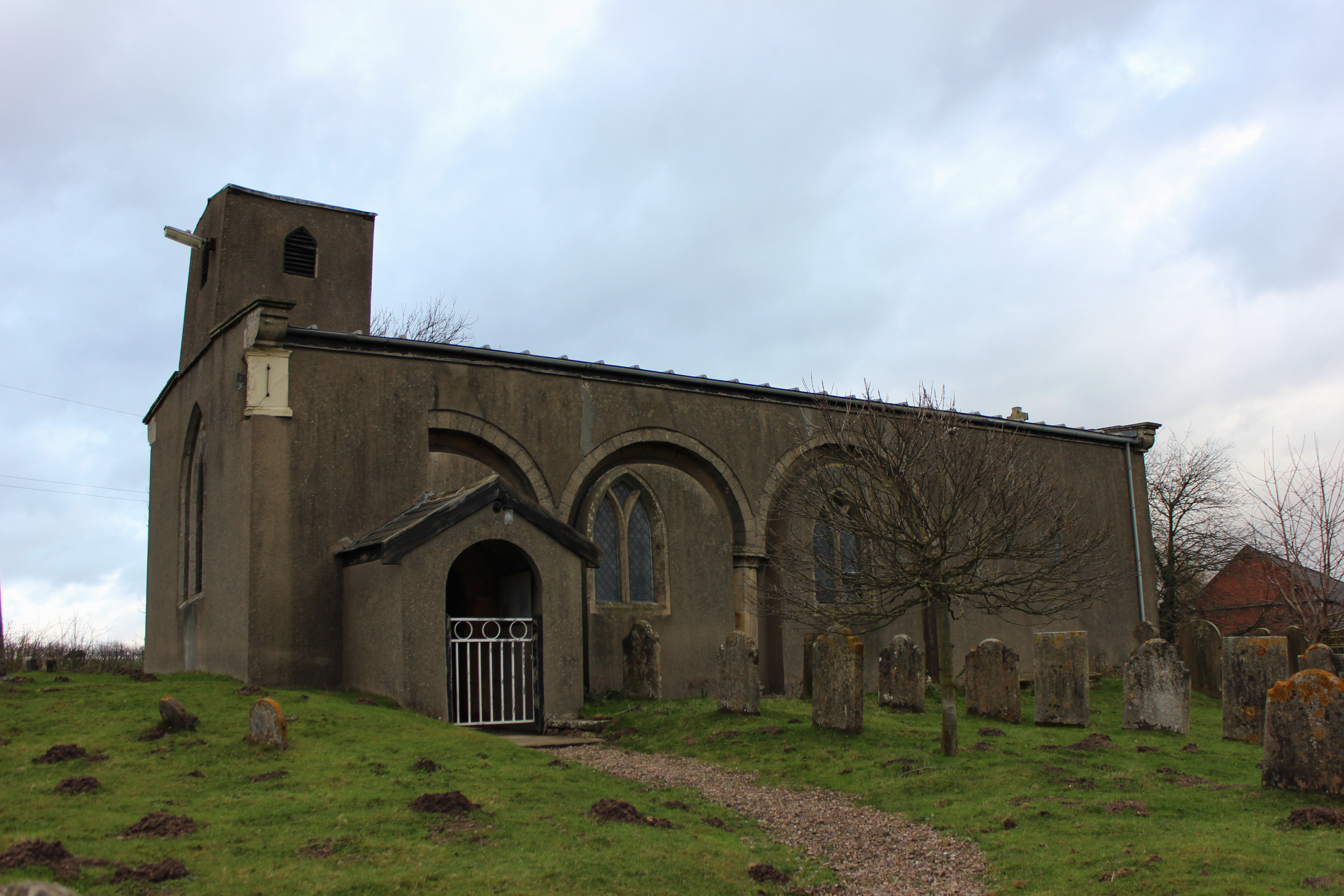
St Giles Church – Carburton

== Carburton Church ==
The chapel of Carburton that is dedicated to Saint Giles is a small edifice that is said to be stood on land liable to flood. There has been no mention of the church in the Domesday Book as the place always seems to have been quite small. It is a simple parallelogram that is 50 ft long and about 15 ft wide. It is made up of a chancel and a nave, as well as having a porch to the south-west and a small vestry to the north-east. It still has three of its original windows, two at the east end and one on the south side. The remaining windows, two on the south and one on the north and west sides, have possibly been replaced during the reign of Edward 1. It also comprises a double sun dial that is situated in the south western angle of the main wall above the porch. This often causes peculiar effects due to the building being not truly orientated.

It is said that up until the Reformation the church was probably owned by Welbeck Abbey and in the early 14th century there was a petition against the Abbot of Welbeck for enclosing land near the abbey belonging to Carburton. The whole building was then restored in the 1880s.

== See also ==
- Listed buildings in Carburton
