= Hardwick Village =

Village in Nottinghamshire, England

Coordinates: 53°16′23″N 1°02′42″W

Hardwick
- Village
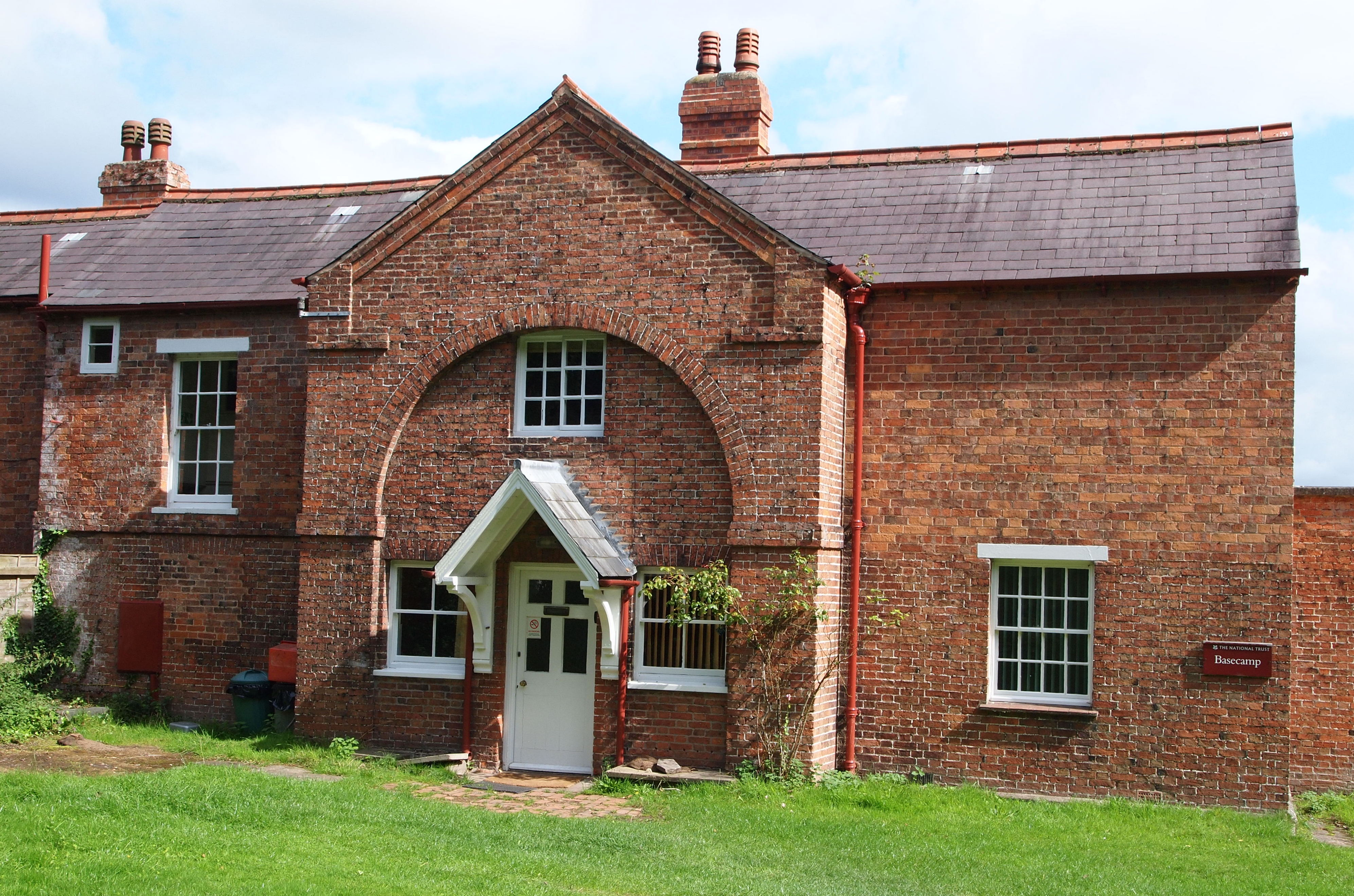
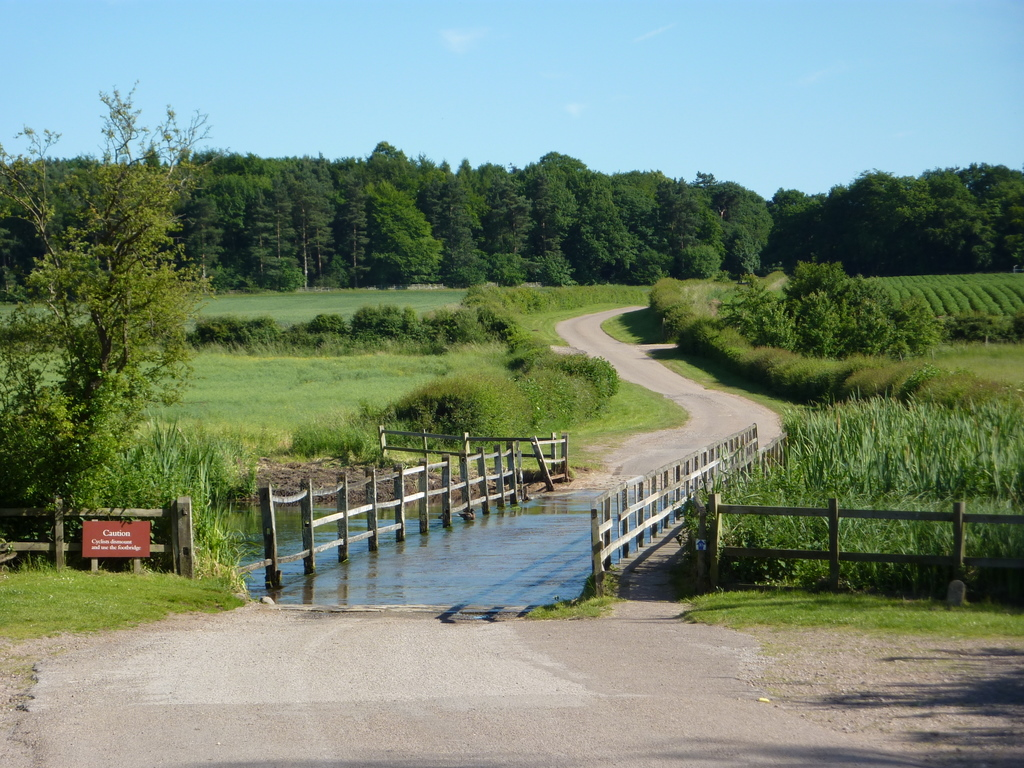
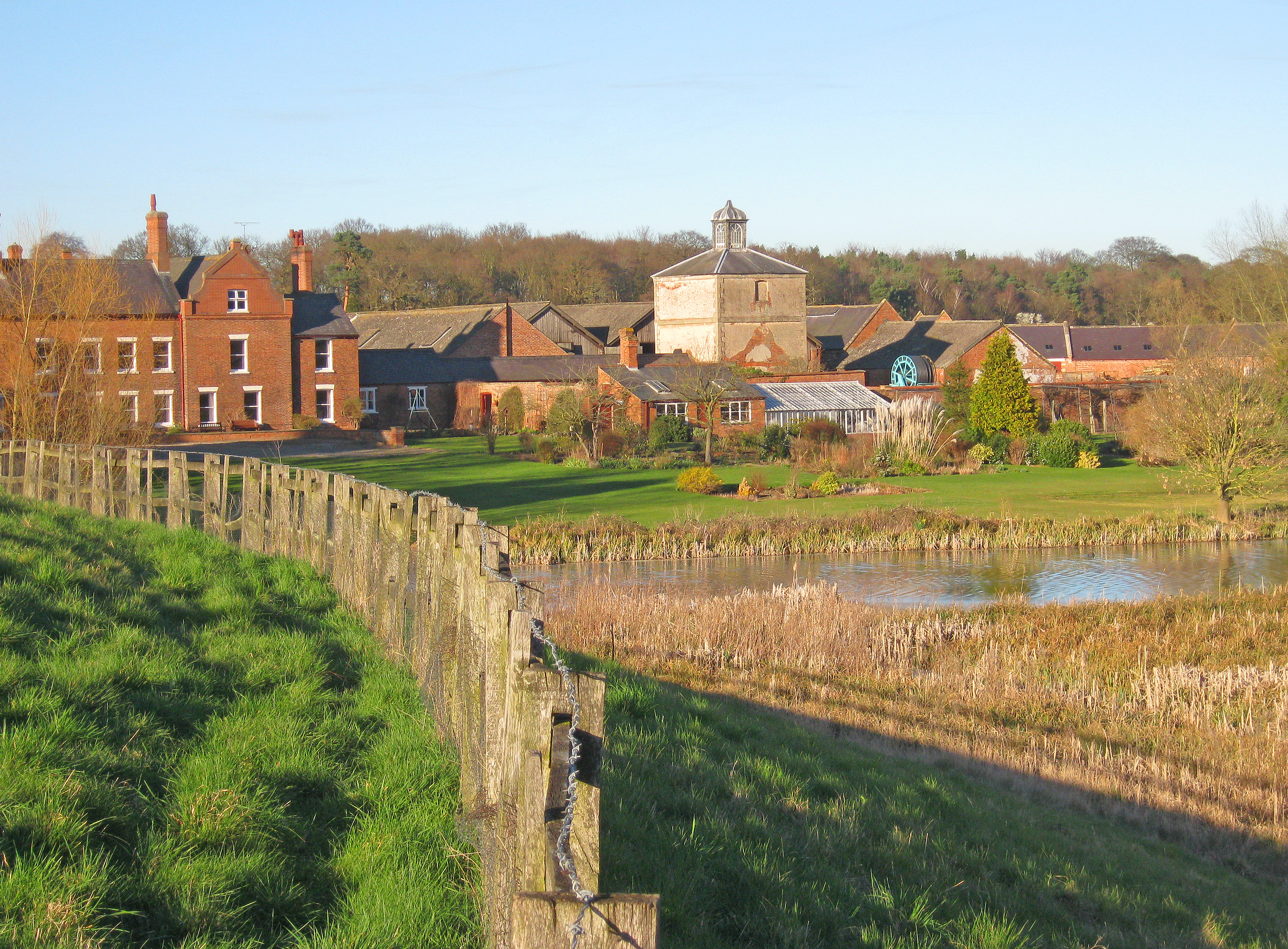
- Estate Cottage The Ford Hardwick Grange

- Location within Nottinghamshire
- District: Bassetlaw
- Shire county: Nottinghamshire
- Region: East Midlands
- Country: England
- Sovereign state: United Kingdom
- Post town: Worksop
- Postcode district: S80
- Dialling code: 01909
- Police: Nottinghamshire
- Fire: Nottinghamshire
- Ambulance: East Midlands
- UK Parliament: Bassetlaw

Hardwick is a rural settlement located in the civil parish of Clumber and Hardwick, within the Bassetlaw district area of Nottinghamshire. It is within Clumber Park, part of a greater area known as The Dukeries. It consists of former labourers' cottages and a couple of farms, including Hardwick Grange.

== History ==
The settlement was created by the landowners, the Dukes of Newcastle, in the later part of the Nineteenth century to serve the Park and estate of Clumber. It was designed on a picturesque, Neo-Elizabethan style, with an asymmetrical aspect designed to give the impression of a traditional village which had grown ad hoc, and to no particular plan.

Since the acquisition of Clumber Park by the National Trust, the village has been under a Covenant of the National Trust, and the village properties under tenancy, rather than tied cottages provided as homes for employees, as previously under the Dukes of Newcastle. Today commuters can be found living in the cottages, rather than estate/farm labourers, though the principal farm, Hardwick Grange, continues to work the land.

== See also ==
- Listed buildings in Clumber and Hardwick
