= Church of St Mary the Virgin, Clumber Park =

Church in Nottinghamshire, England

St Mary the Virgin, Clumber Park
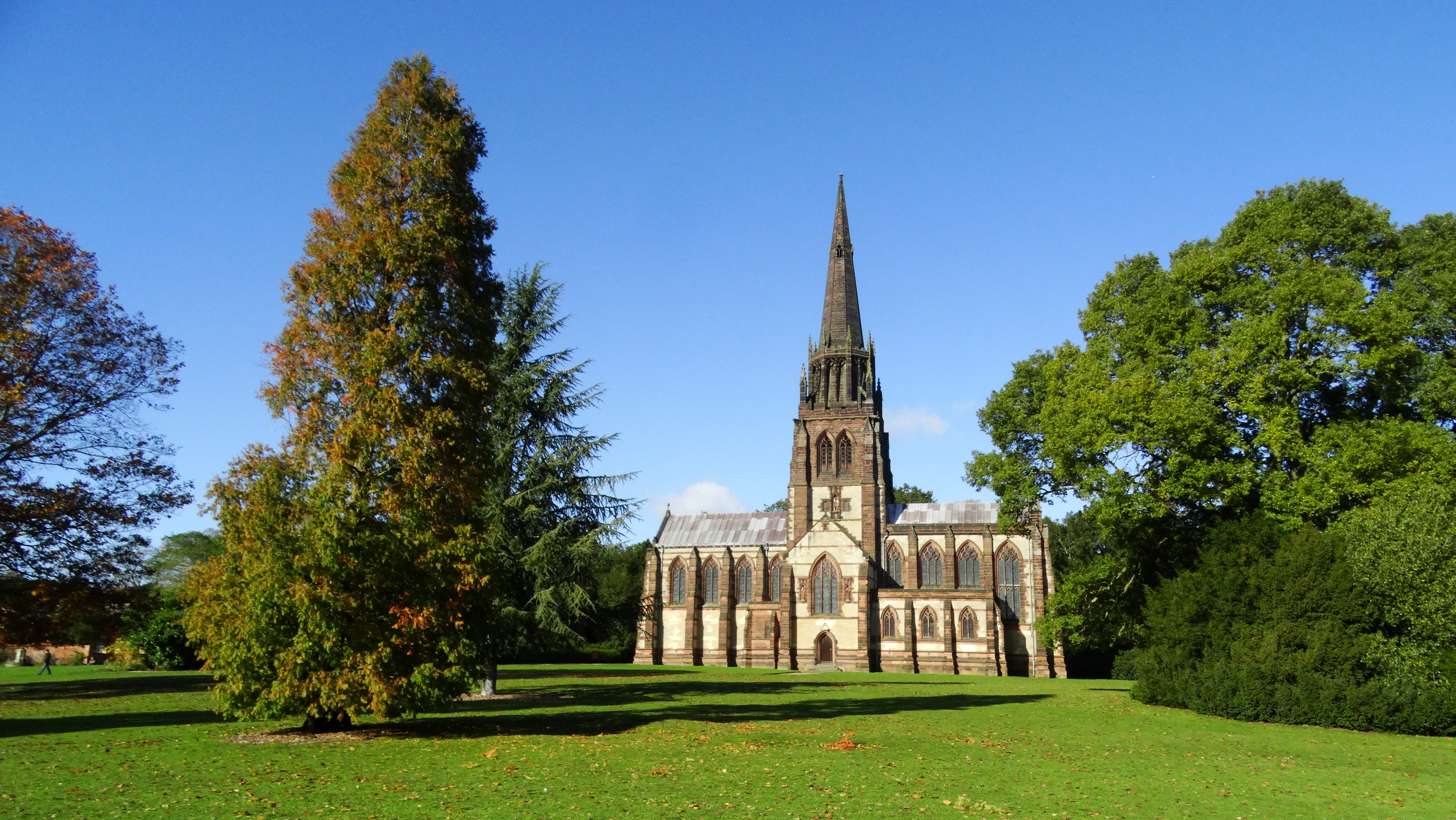
- The Gothic Revival chapel at Clumber Park
- St Mary the Virgin, Clumber Park
- 53°15′53.21″N 1°3′42.62″W
- OS grid reference: SK 62672 74606
- Location: Clumber Park
- Country: England
- Denomination: Church of England
- Churchmanship: Anglo Catholic

History
- Dedication: St Mary the Virgin
- Dedicated: 22 October 1889

Architecture
- Heritage designation: Grade I listed

Specifications
- Length: 125 feet (38 m)
- Width: 65 feet (20 m)
- Height: 175 feet (53 m)

Administration
- Province: Province of York
- Diocese: Diocese of Southwell and Nottingham
- Archdeaconry: Newark
- Deanery: Bassetlaw and Bawtry
- Parish: Worksop Priory

Clergy
- Bishop: The Rt Revd Stephen Race (AEO)
- Vicar: Fr Nicolas Spicer

St Mary the Virgin, Clumber Park, is a Grade I listed Anglican church in Nottinghamshire, England.

== History ==
The Chapel of St Paul at Clumber Park was commissioned by Henry Pelham-Clinton, 5th Duke of Newcastle in 1864. It was designed by the architect Thomas Chambers Hine but not completed and became known as "the pigeon coop". Henry Pelham-Clinton, 7th Duke of Newcastle, demolished it and commissioned a new chapel dedicated to St Mary the Virgin in 1886. It was designed by George Frederick Bodley and built by the contractor R. Franklin of Diddington, Oxfordshire. The stone used in the interior is Red Runcorn, and externally Steetly ashlar with Red Runcorn dressings. It was completed by 1889 at a cost of £30,000 (equivalent to £3,333,011 in 2025). It was opened by the Bishop of Southwell on 22 October 1889 but this ceremony caused alarm in the Protestant Alliance of the Church of England as reported in the Derby Daily Telegraph on 6 November 1889.

The committee and members of the Protestant Alliance have forwarded a memorial to the Archbishop of Canterbury, inviting his Grace's attention to the reports published in the Press regarding the services conducted at the benediction or dedication of the new church at Clumber on the 22nd of October – services “authorised and conducted” by the Bishop of Southwell, the bishop of the diocese, and described as “a function which far exceeded that of Cardiff in grandeur of ritual and dignity of ceremonial”. These reports, it is pointed out, state that the church at Clumber was decorated with a crucifix over the rood screen, with images of the Virgin and of St John, with a baldachino over the “high altar,” and a crucifix on the re-table with a tabernacle for the reserved sacrament, having a silver lamp suspended in front of it, and with other Popish emblems. The service of the Holy Communion was conducted, according to these report, with the formalities observed in the Roman Catholic service of the sacrifice of the mass – formalities condemned by the Courts of Law – and it is further reported that no person whatever communicated with the celebrant. The procession into the Church was headed by a crucifer, bearing a large crucifix, and a thurifer, bearing a censer containing incense. Two handsome banners were carried aloft, the first being that of the blessed sacrament and the second that of the Virgin Mary, on which were inscribed the remarkable words, “S. Maria Mater Dei”. It is further reported that about 50 “priests” took part in the procession; that the Bishop of Lincoln walked in this procession, dressed in a cope of cloth of gold; that he was followed by the Bishop of Southwell, wearing a gorgeous cope, on the back of which was depicted in brilliant colours a representation of the Madonna and Child – the Madonna crowned, the Child uncrowned. The memorialists urge that the use of the idolatrous rites and ceremonies of the Church of Rome tend to alienate the affections of people from the Church of England, and, if not checked and prevents, must eventually lead to an agitation for the disestablishment and disendowment of the National Church. An appeal is made to the Archbishop to use his influence to check and prevent the introduction and the use of such superstitious services and illegal practices.

== Description ==
The church is on a cruciform plan, and has a central tower, which contains one bell and has a 175-foot (53 m) spire rising out of an octagonal corona. It is in the "second Pointed" (i.e. Decorated) style of Gothic architecture. The nave interior is plain but the chancel is decorated with carvings. The stained glass is by Charles Eamer Kempe.

== Services ==
- Sung Mass at 11.30 am every Sunday
- Evensong 3 pm on certain summer Sundays.

== Organ ==
The 3-manual organ was installed in 1889 by Gray & Davison. Apart from an overhaul by Harrison and Harrison in 1979 under the direction of consultant David Butterworth, it has remained unaltered. Its specification can be found on the National Pipe Organ Register.

=== Organists ===
- Rupert Pike 1918–1928

== See also ==
- Grade I listed buildings in Nottinghamshire
- Listed buildings in Clumber and Hardwick
