= Robert Dighton (MP) =

16th-century English politician

Robert Dighton (by 1491–1546), of Lincoln and Little Sturton, (Note: a lost village in East Lindsey) Lincolnshire, was an English politician.

He was a member (MP) of the parliament of England for Lincoln in 1539.
