= Clumber Park =

Estate in Worksop, Nottinghamshire, England

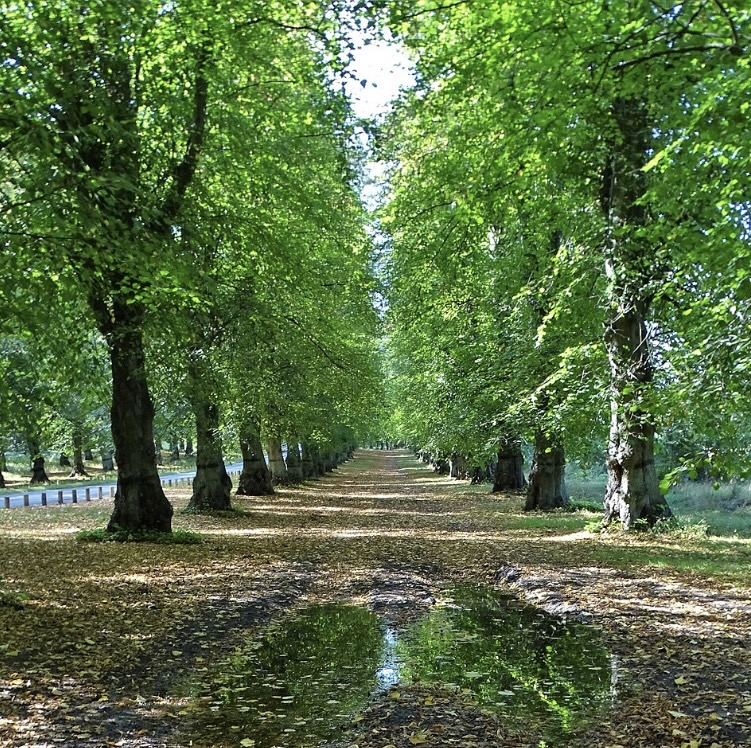
- Lime Tree Avenue

- Location within Nottinghamshire
- Location: Worksop, Nottinghamshire , S80 3BE
- Nearest city: Sheffield
- OS grid: SK625755
- Coordinates: 53°16′23″N 1°03′50″W
- Area: 1,537 hectares (3,800 acres)
- Operator: National Trust
- Visitors: 715,889 (2025)
- Open: Park: 7.00am to dusk. Other facilities have more restricted times.
- Status: SSSI (for map see Map)
- Website: www.nationaltrust.org.uk/clumber-park/

National Register of Historic Parks and Gardens
- Designated: 1 January 1986
- Reference no.: 1001079

Clumber Park is a country park in The Dukeries near Worksop in the civil parish of Clumber and Hardwick, Nottinghamshire, England. The estate, which was the seat of the Pelham-Clintons, Dukes of Newcastle, was purchased by the National Trust in 1946. The village of Hardwick lies within the park.

The gardens and the estate are managed by the National Trust and are open to the public all year round. In 2025, 715,889 people visited Clumber Park, making it one of the National Trust's most visited properties. The Lime Tree Avenue, two miles long, with 1,296 common lime, the longest of its kind in Europe, was planted in 1840.

== History ==
Clumber, mentioned in the Domesday Book in 1086, was a monastic property in the Middle Ages but later came into the hands of the Holles family. In 1707 permission was granted to John Holles, 1st Duke of Newcastle to enclose 3,000 acres (1,200 ha) of Sherwood Forest, and re-purpose it as a deer park. Clumber House, close to the River Poulter, was a pre-existing hunting lodge, which became the core of a new residence built on the site. At the 1st Duke's death in 1711, his nephew Thomas Pelham-Holles inherited the estate, but did little with it, other than spend the money he inherited. At his death in 1768, his nephew Henry Fiennes Pelham-Clinton inherited the title and the estate, and made Clumber Park his residence.

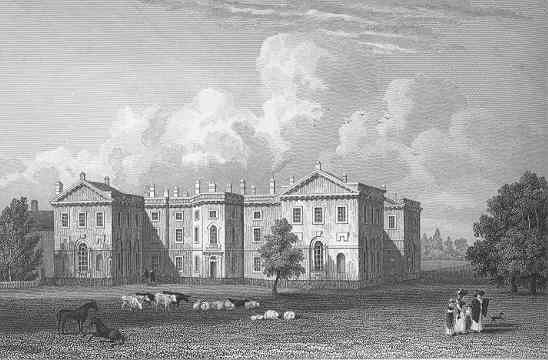
Clumber Park in 1829

From 1759, work on the house and park proceeded, under the supervision of a carpenter and builder named Fuller White (although he is likely to have been working to plans from the architect Stephen Wright) (Note: This differs from the dates of 1768-78 that are referred to by the National Trust). White was dismissed in 1767 and Wright took charge of the project, replacing some of the 1760s features in the 1770s. The project was still not complete when Wright died and some features in and around the park may have been designed by his successor, John Simpson, in the 1780s. It is believed that the Clumber Spaniel was first developed around this time by the 2nd Duke. An early depiction of the breed, along with the Duke and the Park itself, is shown in "The Return from Shooting" (1788) by Francis Wheatley.

In March 1879 a serious fire destroyed much of Clumber House. At the time of the fire the house contained around 500 pictures and around a fifth were destroyed in the fire. Fortunately twenty-four of the best of the collection were on loan to Nottingham Corporation, including The Beggar Boys by Thomas Gainsborough. Serious losses included a portrait of William Herbert, 3rd Earl of Pembroke by Anthony van Dyck, portraits of an old man and old woman by Rembrandt, a portrait of a lady by Titian and Virgin and Child by Albrecht Dürer.

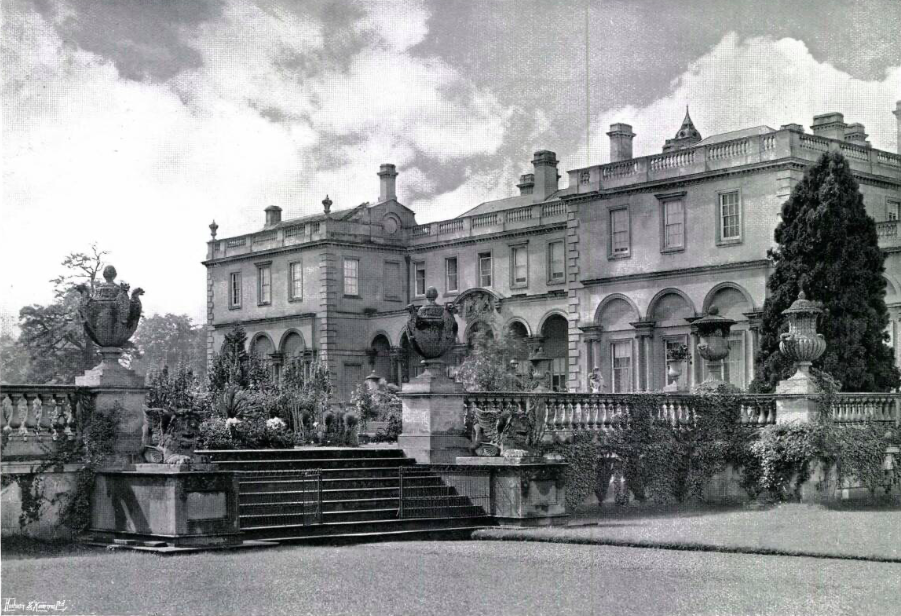
The house in 1908

Henry Pelham-Clinton, 7th Duke of Newcastle, was a minor at the time of the fire and the trustees approved the new plans by Charles Barry in 1880. Work was still going on in 1884 when it was reported that a temporary front had been built pending the erection of two large wings and an entrance hall. The other sides of the houses were completed, including the addition of a billiard room. By 1886 the building was mostly restored although it was reported that part of the west front was yet to be added. One significant improvement was a scheme whereby the sewage which used to go into the lake was diverted to Hardwick Meadows, over a mile away from the house.

Another fire in 1912 caused less damage when a fire broke out in the nursery in the north wing.

The house was closed after the death in 1928 of Henry Pelham-Clinton, 7th Duke of Newcastle owing to death duties. His successor moved into the Parsonage building in the park. The mansion, which, like many other houses during this period, was demolished in 1938 to avoid a tax bill. Prior to demolition, the 9th Duke sold the contents of the house to repay debts.

=== Sale and demolition ===
In 1938 Charles Boot, of Henry Boot Construction, was contracted to demolish the house and he removed a vast array of statues, façades and fountains to his Derbyshire home, Thornbridge Hall, although most were purchased by private buyers at auction. The Duke's study, designed by Barry, is all that survives of the main house and is presently home to the Clumber Café. It is Grade II on the National Heritage List for England.

Most of the ducal properties and land assets were sold to the London and Fort George Land Company (LFG) in 1927 by the 7th Duke of Newcastle to pay off debts and acquired by the National Trust in 1946.

== Estate ==
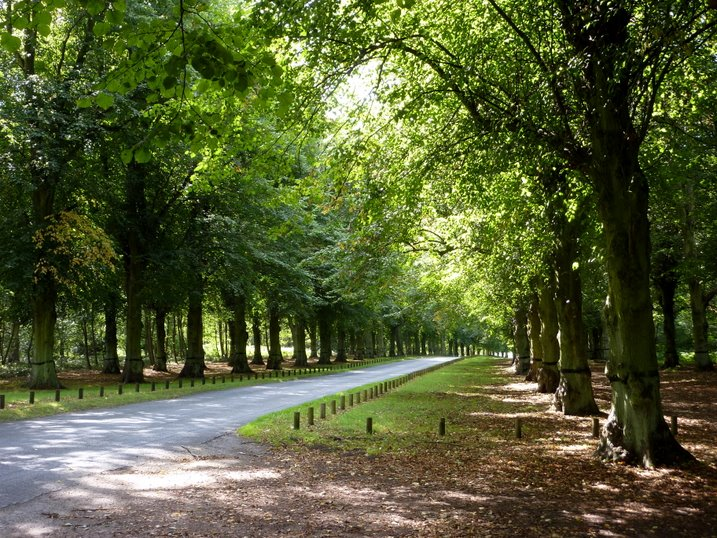
Lime Tree Avenue

Clumber Park is over 3,800 acres (1,500 ha; 5.9 sq mi) in extent, including woods, open heath and rolling farmland. It contains the longest double avenue of lime trees in Europe. The avenue was created by Henry Pelham-Clinton, 5th Duke of Newcastle in the 19th century and extends for more than 2 mi (3.2 km). Clumber Lake is a serpentine lake covering 87 acres (35 ha; 0.136 sq mi) south of the site of Clumber House and extending 1.2 mi (2 km) to the east. The lake was partially rebuilt in the 1980s and again in 2004 after suffering from subsidence from coal mining. Hardwick Village lies within the park, near the eastern end of the lake.

=== Church of St Mary ===
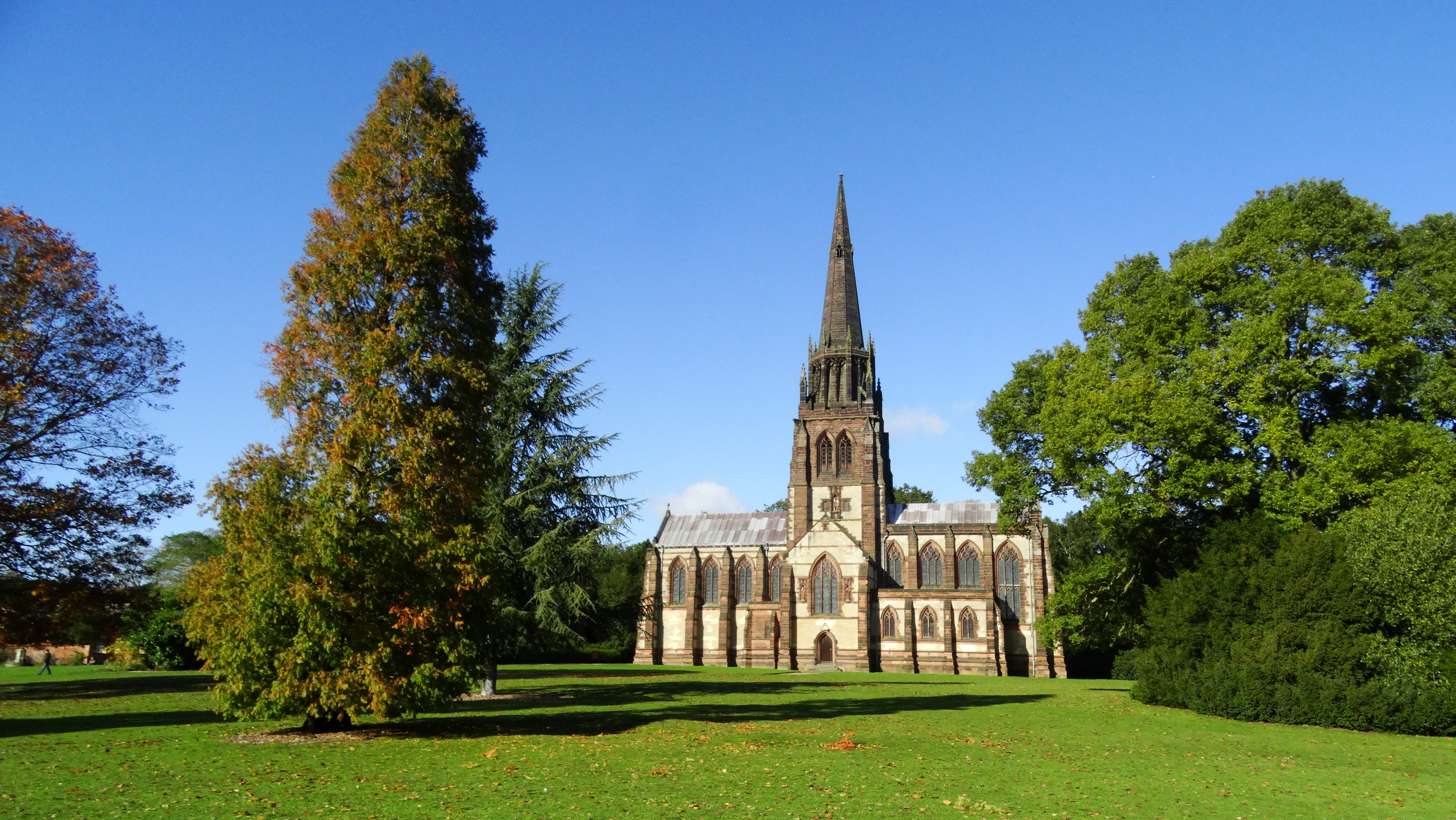
Church of St Mary the Virgin

The Church of St Mary the Virgin, a Grade I listed Gothic Revival chapel, was commissioned in 1886 by the seventh duke to replace a church commissioned by the fifth duke in 1864. It was designed by George Frederick Bodley and built by the contractor R. Franklin of Diddington, Oxfordshire. The stone used in the interior is Red Runcorn, and externally Steetly ashlar with Red Runcorn dressings. It was completed in 1889 at a cost of £30,000 and opened by the Bishop of Southwell on 22 October.

=== Clumber Park Bridge ===
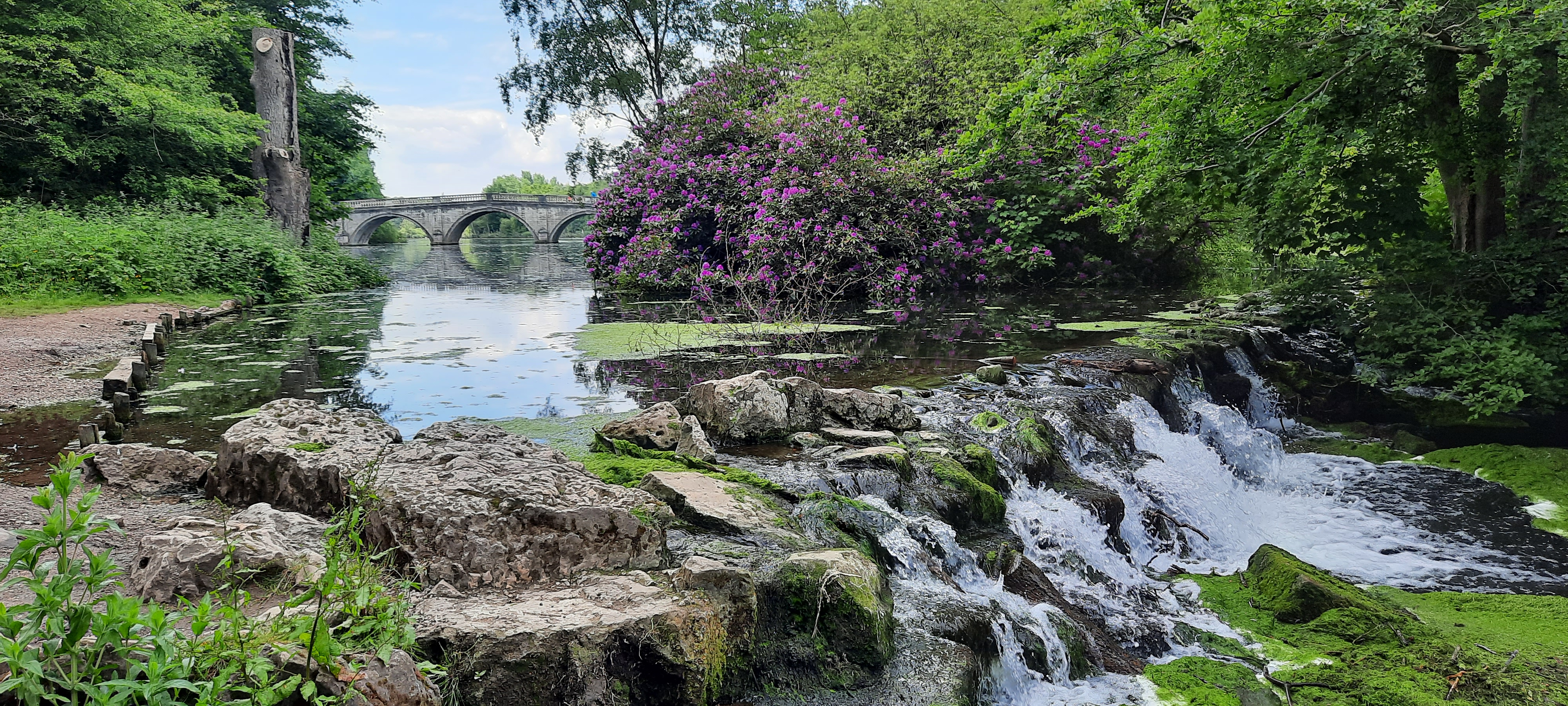
Clumber Bridge

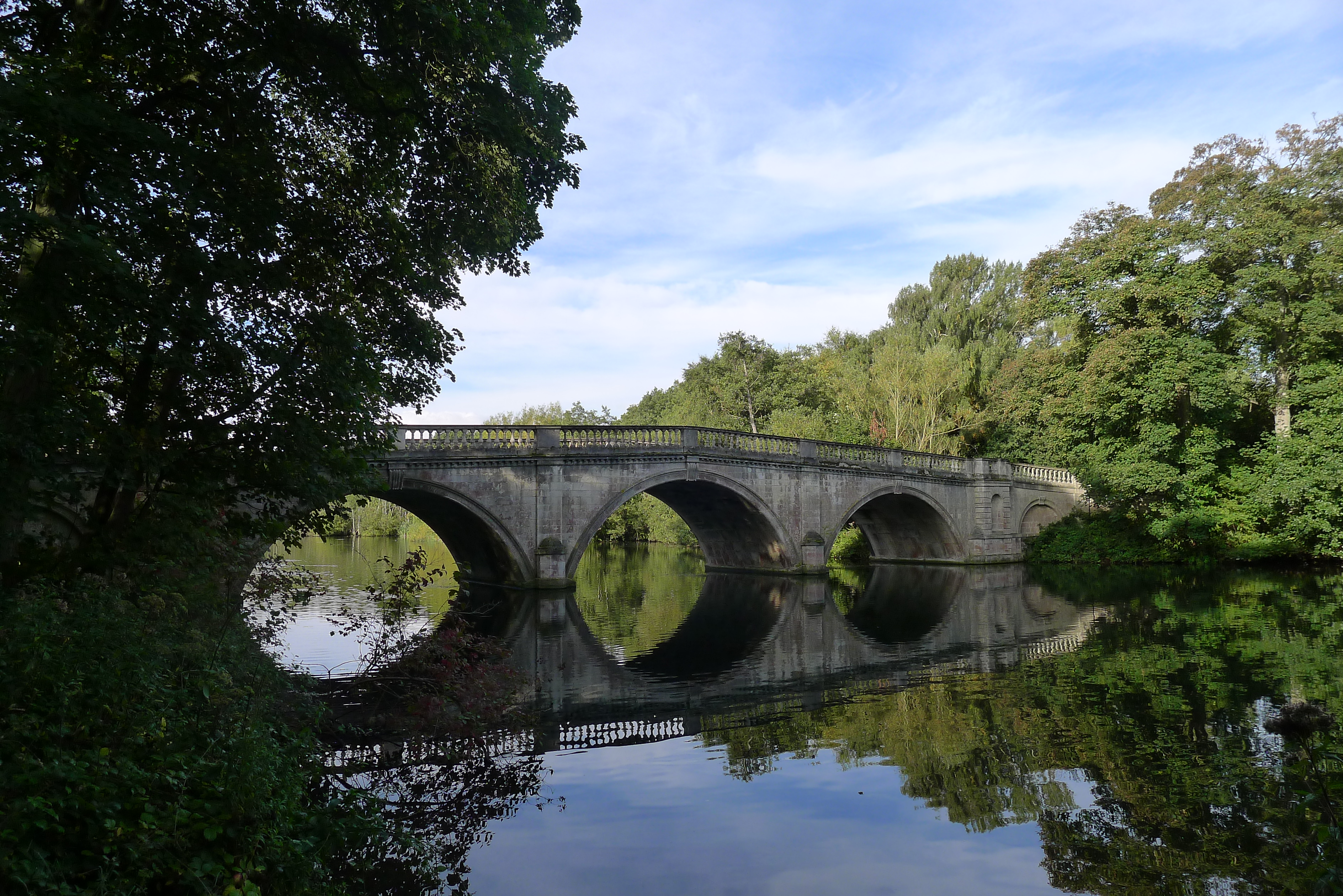
Clumber Park Bridge

In March 2018 the park's ornamental bridge suffered extensive damage after a car was deliberately driven into it. The car, thought to be stolen, was burnt out nearby. The National Trust said it appeared to be "an act of intentional damage". The Grade-I listed bridge over the River Poulter was believed to have been built in the 1760s.

The bridge remains permanently closed to vehicular traffic. As a training exercise, police divers recovered hundreds of pieces of broken stone knocked into the river. A floating pontoon platform to support scaffolding was built and stonemasons started to rebuild the bridge using some original fragments in October 2019. The bridge was re-opened to foot-traffic only in July 2020 after extensive restorative stonework. The final stage of the restoration aims to install protective bollards in the shape of Clumber Spaniels to stand guard over the bridge and protect it for future generations.

Just over a week after the bridge damage, a waste-bin, a National Trust van and a barn known as The Bunk House were set alight in an arson attack. Two months later in May, six engraved brass plaques containing the names of men who had died in wars were stolen from nearby Hardwick Village War Memorial. The memorial is a Grade-II listed structure and the plaques were 100 years old.

=== Discovery Centre ===
Starting from 2009, a grant of £797,000 from the Heritage Lottery Fund enabled renovation of the Grade II listed derelict old brewhouse, part of the old stable block, to create an exhibition and discovery centre.

== Gardens ==
The main house was demolished in 1938 after damage by several fires. The nearby Grade I listed chapel in Gothic Revival style and a four-acre walled kitchen garden still survive.

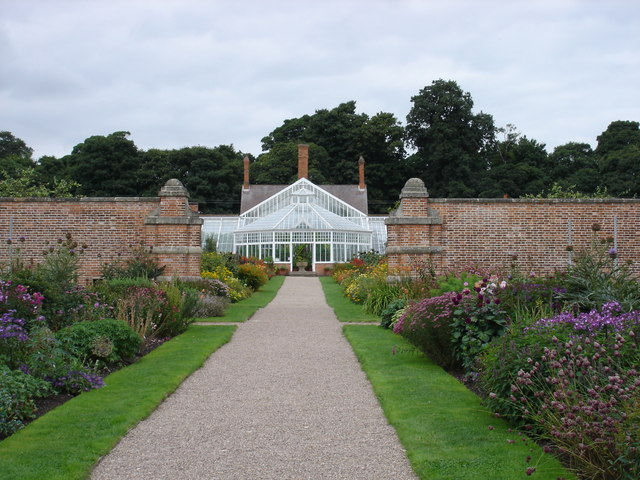
Walled Garden

The 4-acre (1.6 ha) walled kitchen garden east of the cricket pitch has a glasshouse 450 ft (140 m) long and containing Pelargoniums, grapevines and a Butia capitata palm. It was once heated by an underfloor system, fired by local coal, allowing exotic plants to be grown all year round. The pipework is in place beneath the ornate metal floor grates. The garden is divided by pathways and contains vegetables, herbs, fruit, flowers and an ornate rose garden. The garden hosts the National Collection of apple varieties from Nottinghamshire, Derbyshire, Lincolnshire, Leicestershire and Yorkshire with more than 101 varieties of apple including the 'Sisson's Worksop Newton' apple. The garden also has the National Collection of rhubarb, numbering over 135 edible varieties - the second largest collection in the world - as well as locally derived varieties of vegetables such as the 'Clayworth Prize Pink' celery. The lower end of the garden is reached by an iron gate to Cedar Avenue allowing colder air and moisture to move out of the garden avoiding the creation of frost pockets which could damage tender plants or reduce the growing season.

== Site of Special Scientific Interest ==
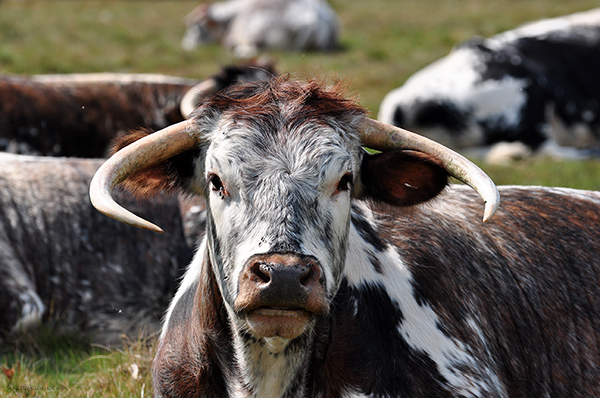
English Longhorn cattle

In 1981 an area of 1,301.20 acres (526.58 ha) was designated an SSSI. A wide variety of species-rich habitats surround the former mansion, including the lake and wetlands, grassland, heath and mature deciduous woodland. The mature trees and dead and decaying ancient trees provide good habitats for beetles. There are breeding birds of woods and heath including nightjar, woodlark, redstart, hawfinch, water rail and gadwall ducks. Ancient breeds of English Longhorn cattle and Jacob sheep have been introduced to pastures surrounding the lake as part of the process for managing the grassland habitats while safeguarding rare livestock breeds. In January 2018 the National Trust sent a "heartfelt letter" to the environment manager at fracking company Ineos, asking her to visit the park and to stop its survey there for shale gas reserves.

== Events ==
Close to the main parking area is a cricket pitch with a thatched roof pavilion in the style of a cottage, clad in rustic split logs. Along the road side are large open areas to park and picnic. The park is used by walkers and has several miles of paths and cycle tracks surrounding the lake. The park has bicycles for hire. The visitor centre is in the old stable block, part of which houses a display on the history of the park, a shop and restaurant. Off the main lime tree avenue are camping facilities. Route 6 of the National Cycle Network passes through the park, linking it to Sherwood Forest and Sherwood Pines.

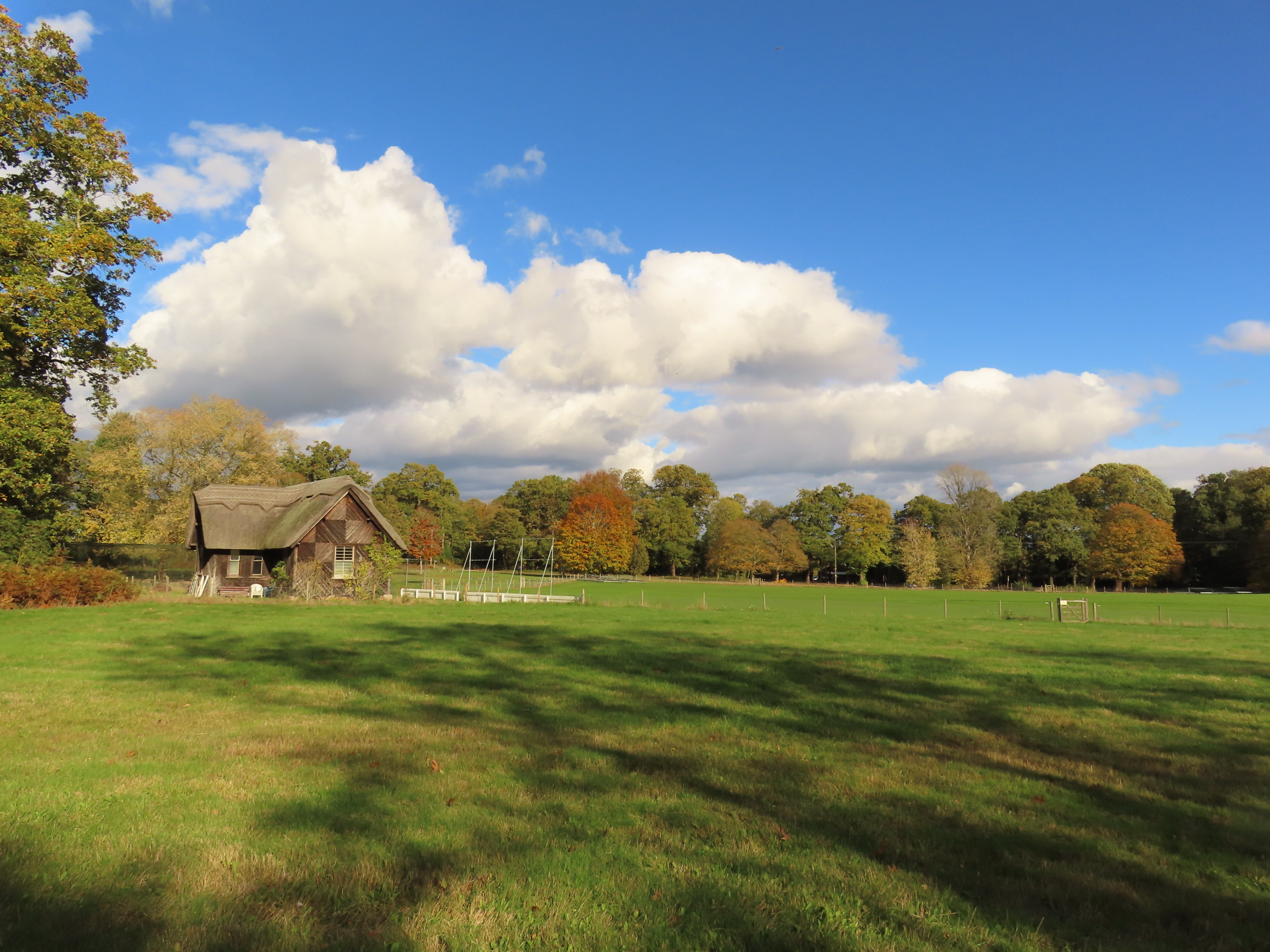
Cricket Ground and thatched roof pavilion

As of 2013 a parkrun takes place in the grounds every Saturday.

== Amenities ==
Clumber Park court yard houses a cafe, shop, bookshop, the Discovery Centre and plant shop.

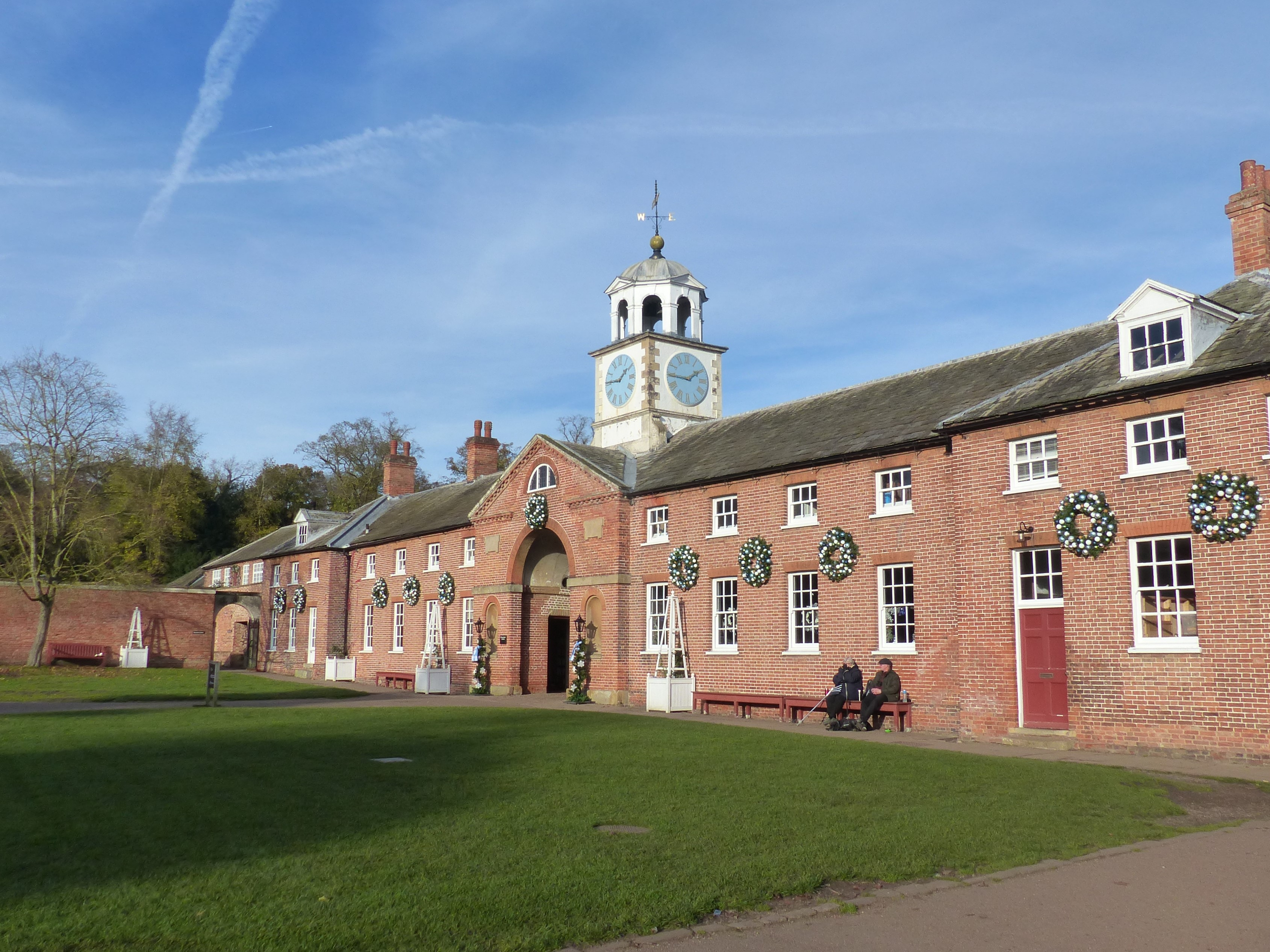
Book Shop and former stables

== See also ==
- Listed buildings in Clumber and Hardwick
- List of Sites of Special Scientific Interest in Nottinghamshire
