= Low Pavement, Nottingham =

Street in Nottingham, England

Low Pavement
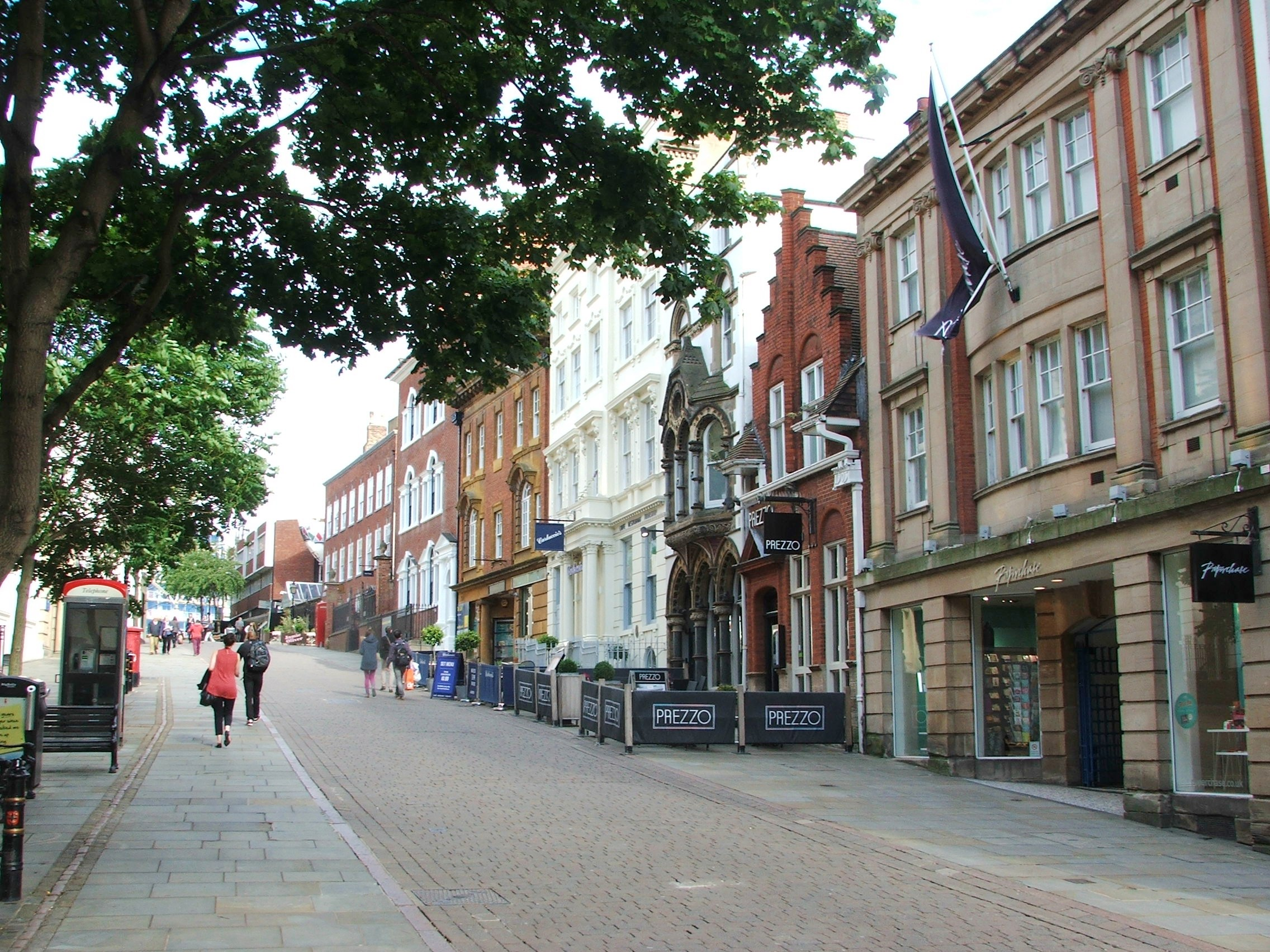
- Low Pavement

- Location within Nottingham
- Maintained by: Nottingham City Council
- Coordinates: 52.9515°N 1.1478°W

Low Pavement is a short street located in Nottingham, England. It connects Castle Gate and Middle Pavement, which in turn connects to High Pavement.

== Listed buildings ==
=== North side ===
- Old Assembly Rooms (9 Low Pavement, Grade II listed)
- 11 Low Pavement (Grade II listed)
- 13 Low Pavement (Grade II listed)
- 19 Low Pavement (Grade II listed)

=== South side ===
- 4–6 Low Pavement (Grade II listed)
- 8 Low Pavement (Grade II listed)
- 10 Low Pavement (Grade II listed)
- 12 Low Pavement (Grade II listed)
- Enfield Chambers (14–16 Low Pavement, Grade II listed)
- Enfield House (18 Low Pavement, Grade II* listed)
- Willoughby House (20–22 Low Pavement, Grade II* listed) and railings and gate to forecourt (Grade II* listed)
- 24–26 Low Pavement (Grade II* listed) and gate and railings to forecourt (Grade II* listed)
- Pair of K6 telephone kiosks outside Nos. 24 and 26 (Grade II listed)

== See also ==
- Grade II* listed buildings in Nottinghamshire
- Listed buildings in Nottingham (Bridge ward)
