= 10 Low Pavement =

Listed building in Nottingham, England

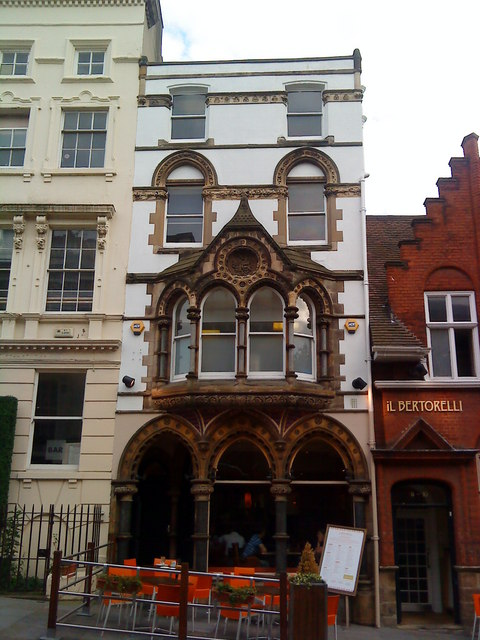
- 10 Low Pavement, Nottingham

- Location within Nottingham

General information
- Architectural style: Gothic Revival
- Location: Nottingham, England
- Coordinates: 52°57′4.9″N 1°8′53″W
- Completed: 1876
- Client: Thomas Jones Rowe

Design and construction
- Architect: Alfred Smith

Listed Building – Grade II*
- Official name: 10, Low Pavement
- Designated: 12 July 1972
- Reference no.: 1270636

10 Low Pavement is a Grade II listed building on Low Pavement in Nottingham, England.

== History ==
The building was constructed in 1876 to the designs of the architect, Alfred Smith. It was built for Thomas Jones Rowe, a tailor and outfitter. The front is designed in the 13th-century Gothic style, with a base of brown Whitby stone, two windows are supported by pillars of Irish red marble and Scottish granite in white and blue overhead. The first floor provided offices and cutting-rooms and was used for the display of goods. The second floor, reached by a staircase contained a retiring room for patrons. The etched window panes, chandeliers and fittings were custom-made. It has been described as "a wild version of William Burges."

Rowe died in 1895 and by 1902 it was occupied by William Malin Hunt, Sons & Bright, electrical engineers, valuers and surveyors. By 1912 it was the offices of the Atlas Assurance Company Limited.

It was designated a Grade II listed building in 1972.

== See also ==
- Listed buildings in Nottingham (Bridge ward)
