= Willoughby House, Nottingham =

Listed building in Nottingham, England

Coordinates: 52°57′4.5″N 1°8′51″W

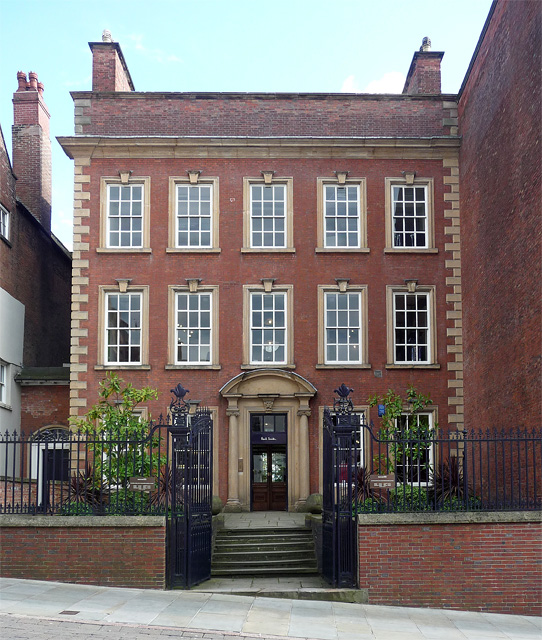
- Willoughby House, 20–22 Low Pavement, Nottingham

- Location in central Nottingham

General information
- Location: Low Pavement, Nottingham, England
- Completed: c. 1738

Listed Building – Grade II*
- Official name: Willoughby House
- Designated: 11 August 1952
- Reference no.: 1254559

Listed Building – Grade II*
- Official name: Railings and gate to forecourt at Willoughby House
- Designated: 12 July 1972
- Reference no.: 1254748

Willoughby House is a Grade II* listed building on Low Pavement, Nottingham, England.

== History ==
Willoughby House was erected circa 1738 as a town house for Hon. Rothwell Willoughby son of Thomas Willoughby, 1st Baron Middleton.

The records for the Borough of Nottingham on 20 June 1743 report:

Permit to set palisades in front of a house. - Ordered that Rothwell Willoughby Esquire have leave to set his Palisadoes before his house in the Low Pavement out into the Street so farr as to Range with Mrs Taylors front and three feet four Inches from the Corner of Mr Stockdale's House paying two Shillings and sixpence a year for the same.

On the death of Rothwell Willoughby in 1752 it was owned by his nephew, Rothwell Southeby Willoughby until he died in 1764. Then Ichabod Wright, ironmonger and banker, held the property until 1806. Lewis Allsopp an attorney purchased it, and it was his home and place of business until 1835.

In 1848 it was taken over by the Classical, Mathematical and Commercial Academy superintended by Messrs Buddulph and Son which had previously been located in Halifax Place. Shortly afterwards it became known as the Willoughby House Academy.

By 1885 it was occupied by the Borough Justices' Clerks' Office, two barristers and firms of solicitors and accountants, including an assurance company until the early 1970s when it was occupied by Freeth Carthwright solicitors.

Willoughby House was designated a Grade II* listed building in 1952. The railings and gate forming the frontage of the property were separately Grade II* listed in 1972. The central segment-arched double gates with openwork piers and finials, are flanked by ramped spearhead railings and set on a low brick wall with ashlar coping. They may well have been manufactured by the local ironsmith, Francis Foulgham. They were restored in 1990.

The building was restored in 2004 by Franklin Ellis as a flagship store for fashion designer Paul Smith.

== See also ==
- Grade II* listed buildings in Nottinghamshire
- Listed buildings in Nottingham (Bridge ward)
