= Enfield House =

Listed building in Nottingham, England

Coordinates: 52°57′4.9″N 1°8′52″W

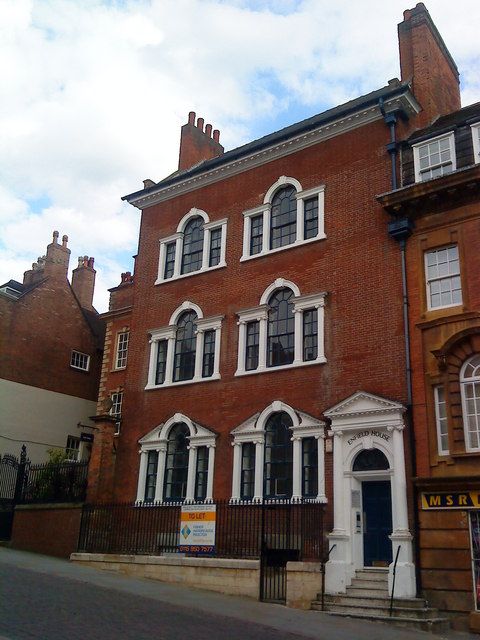
- Enfield House, 18 Low Pavement, Nottingham

- Location within Nottingham

General information
- Location: 18 Low Pavement, Nottingham, England
- Year built: Mid-18th century
- Renovated: Late 18th century (rear wing); Late 20th century (converted)

Listed Building – Grade II*
- Official name: Enfield House and attached area wall
- Designated: 11 August 1952
- Reference no.: 1270637

Enfield House is a Grade II* listed building at 18 Low Pavement, Nottingham, England.

== History ==
The house was occupied by a Mr. Stockdale in 1743 and he may have been responsible for the current frontage of Enfield House which was erected c. 1755 and was probably a refacing of an existing building. It is noted for its fine Venetian windows. The rear facade of the house is thought to have been built in 1760. The building contains cellars with brick vaults, wine bins and thrawls, cut from the rock on two levels linked by a winder stair. The house became known as Enfield House after it was lived in by Henry Enfield from 1815, town clerk from 1816 to 1845. After his death, other members of the Enfield family continued to live there and eventually it became the business premises of Henry Houghton Enfield, solicitor until 1934. Enfield House was designated a Grade II* listed building in 1952.

== See also ==
- Grade II* listed buildings in Nottinghamshire
- Listed buildings in Nottingham (Bridge ward)
