= Listed buildings in Nottingham (Bridge ward) =

Bridge ward is an electoral ward in the city of Nottingham, England. The ward contains over 270 listed buildings that are recorded in the National Heritage List for England. Of these, two are listed at Grade I, the highest of the three grades, 18 are at Grade II*, the middle grade, and the others are at Grade II, the lowest grade. The ward includes the centre of the city, and the area to the south towards the River Trent. The districts contained in the ward include Nottingham city centre, Lace Market and The Meadows.

Initially a market town, Nottingham became involved in the textile industry as early as the 12th century. In the early 18th century it had become a centre for the hosiery industry, with many buildings containing stocking knitting frames. From the 1780s this developed into the lace industry, and the stocking frames were adapted for lace production. By the 1840s, the town had become the English centre for lace production, with the building of factories and warehouses. Many of the listed buildings were associated with the lace industry, including houses with attics lit by long horizontal windows, former factories and warehouses, which have later been used for other purposes. The other listed buildings include houses and associated structures, shops, offices, churches, chapels and items in churchyards, public buildings, bridges, former almshouses, banks, railway buildings, a boundary marker, statues, a former toll house, canal buildings, public conveniences, a former tram depot, entrances to the Victoria Embankment, a former cinema, war memorials, flagstaffs and lamp posts, and telephone kiosks.

== Key ==
| Grade | Criteria |
|---|---|
| I | Buildings of exceptional interest, sometimes considered to be internationally important |
| II* | Particularly important buildings of more than special interest |
| II | Buildings of national importance and special interest |

== Buildings ==
| Name and location | Photograph | Date | Notes | Grade |
|---|---|---|---|---|
| St Mary's Church; 52.95122°N 1.14297°W | | 15th century | The church, which incorporates earlier material, has been altered and extended through the centuries, particularly during the 19th and early 20th centuries. It is built in stone with lead roofs, and has a cruciform plan, consisting of a nave with a clerestory, north and south aisles with a north choir vestry and a south porch, north and south transepts, a chancel with a south vestry and a chapter house, and a tower at the crossing. The tower has three stages, angle buttresses, string courses, clock faces on the east and west, two-light bell openings, and an embattled parapet with eight crocketed pinnacles. The south porch has a gable with blind panelling, and a cusped doorway with double shafts. The inner doorway has a triangular head, and voussoirs with fleurons, and is flanked by niches with decorative canopies. The body of the church is also embattled, the battlements on the nave and aisles panelled. | I |
| St Peter's Church; 52.95232°N 1.14858°W | | 15th century | The church, which incorporates earlier material, has been altered and extended through the centuries, particularly during the 19th and 20th centuries. It is built in stone with slate roofs, and consists of a nave with a clerestory, north and south aisles, a north transept, a chancel with vestries, and a west steeple. The steeple has a tower with three stages, angle buttresses, and a west doorway with a pointed arch, pinnacles and niches, above which is a three-light window with a pointed arch. On each side is a clock face, the bell openings have two lights, and above is an embattled parapet with four crocketed pinnacles, and a recessed octagonal spire. The nave and aisles also have embattled parapets. | I |
| The Bell Inn; 52.95349°N 1.15196°W | | Late 15th century | The public house has a timber framed core, and was refronted in about 1820, with a stucco front, and it has a hipped tile roof. There are two storeys and three bays. The front has a moulded pediment containing a bell in relief, under which is a panel with the name in relief lettering. The windows are sashes, and in the ground floor is a replica early 19th-century shop front with a cornice and a bow window, and a doorway with a fanlight. Underneath, there are extensive rock-hewn cellars. | II |
| Flying Horse Walk; 52.95314°N 1.14860°W | | c. 1483 | A public house extended in the 18th century, and later restored and converted into the façade of a shopping precinct, incorporating shops. It is timber framed with rendered infill, facsimile pargeted panels and tile roofs. There are two storeys and attics, and five gabled bays. The gables have carved bargeboards, and the windows are cross casements. The central bay projects, it has three storeys, each upper storey jettied. In the ground floor is an arcade with three wooden Tuscan columns. In the top storey are inscribed panels, and there is a relief column in the gable apex. The ground floor contains windows, a doorway and a modern shop front, and the upper storeys of the left two bays is slightly jettied. | II |
| 11 Bridlesmith Gate; 52.95269°N 1.14714°W | | Early 16th century | A house, later extended and converted into a shop, it has a timber-framed core encased in brick, the front is rendered and it has a tile roof. There are two storeys and attics, and two bays. The upper floor is jettied on brackets, and the attic is further jettied, and gabled with bargeboards. In the ground floor is a late 20th-century shop front, and above are casement windows and a horizontally-sliding sash window. Inside, there are close studded walls. | II |
| 54 and 56 Bridlesmith Gate; 52.95175°N 1.14714°W | — | Early 16th century | Two houses, later a shop, with a timber framed core, it was refronted in the 19th century, and has painted brick cladding and a slate roof. There are three storeys and two bays. In the ground floor is a late 20th-century shop front with a central doorway and rusticated stone pilasters. The upper floors contain sash windows with wedge lintels and double keystones, and inside the shop is exposed timber framing. | II |
| Salutation Inn; 52.95117°N 1.15176°W | | 16th century | The public house has a timber framed core, the exterior is partly roughcast and partly in red brick, and the roofs are tiled. There are two storeys, attics and cellars, and an L-shaped plan, with fronts of four bays. Most of the windows are casements. The front facing St Nicholas Street has a jettied upper floor and a gable with decorative bargeboards, and contains a four-light mullioned window. The right bay of the front facing Maid Marion Way is gabled and contains an oriel window. Inside the building is exposed timber framing, and under it are rock cut cellars at two levels. | II |
| St Nicholas Church; 52.95049°N 1.15095°W | | 1671–78 | The church replaced an earlier church on the site, and has since been altered and extended. It is built in red brick with stone dressings, and has roofs of copper and slate. The church consists of a nave, north and south aisles, a chancel with an organ chamber and a vestry, and a west tower. The tower is unbuttressed, and has three stages, quoins, a west doorway above which is a cross-mullioned window, a north clock face with a diamond surround, two-light bell openings, and a parapet with corner pedestals. The north aisle has an embattled parapet, and it contains two doorways with pointed arches and chamfered surrounds. | II* |
| 26, 28 and 30 Broad Street; 52.95480°N 1.14439°W | | Late 17th century | A row of three houses with weavers' workshops above, in red brick with a tile roof. There are three storeys and attics, and six bays. The left house has a round-headed doorway with a fanlight flanked by shop windows, to its right is a segmental-headed passage entry, and the other houses have shop fronts. In the middle floor are sash windows, and the top floor contains multi-light workshop windows. In the attic are two gabled dormers. | II |
| 41 Pilcher Gate; 52.95233°N 1.14431°W | | Late 17th century | A house on a corner site, later offices, in colourwashed stucco, on a stone plinth, with stone dressings, and a slate roof. There are three storeys and a front of five bays. The central round-arched doorway has an entablature with Ionic pilasters and a fanlight, there is a round-arched doorway in the right return, and most of the windows are sashes. | II |
| 52 and 52A, Bridlesmith Gate; 52.95183°N 1.14715°W | — | c. 1700 | A pair of houses, possibly incorporating earlier material, later a shop and offices, in brick and stuccoed at the front. There are three storeys and attics, and four bays. In the ground floor is a late 20th-century shop front, with a doorway to the left and then a wider entry. The upper floors contain sash windows, and above are two through-eaves dormers in coped gables. | II |
| 21 and 23 Goose Gate; 52.95383°N 1.14284°W | | c. 1700 | A house, later two shops, in red brick with stone dressings and a roof of tile and slate. There are three storeys and attics, and four bays, the left bay being a gabled cross wing. In the ground floor are two shop fronts, the right dating from the late 19th century with a recessed doorway, and to the left is a passage entry. The left bay contains tripartite plate glass windows in the upper floors, and the other bays contain sash windows with keystones above which is a moulded parapet. At the rear is a shop front and a hipped dormer. | II |
| 54–57 Long Row West; 52.95393°N 1.15213°W | | 1705 | A row of three houses converted into shops, in painted brick, with dressings in painted brick and stone, coped gables, and vaulted cellars, mostly carved out of sandstone rock. The left shop has an arcade with a canopy on four cast iron Doric columns, behind which is a shop front. The two floors above each contain five sash windows linked by bands, those in the upper floor with moulded surrounds and projecting keystones, and in the top floor are three gables, each containing a window with a keystone and a finial. The middle shop has an arcade with three columns, and the two floors above each contains four sash windows with keystones, linked by bands. Above them is a bracketed cornice and four gabled dormers. The arcade of the right shop has two columns before a shop front and a passage entry, above are three floors each containing three sash windows, and above them is a cornice. | II* |
| Pipeclay headstone 52.95130°N 1.14360°W | — | c. 1707 | The headstone is in the churchyard of St Mary's Church, northeast of the church. It is in overburnt pipeclay, and was made by a pipe maker in memory of two of his daughters. The headstone has a round-arched head and largely illegible impressed lettering. | II |
| 48 and 50 Bridlesmith Gate; 52.95191°N 1.14718°W | — | Early 18th century | A house, later a shop and offices, in red brick, with brick dressings, a coped parapet and coped gables. There are three storeys and four bays. In the ground floor are two late 19th-century shop fronts, with side doors, one converted into a window, and shaped fascia boards. The upper floors contain sash windows with flat brick arches. | II |
| 33 Castle Gate; 52.95088°N 1.15114°W | | Early 18th century | A house, later offices, in brick, stuccoed on the front, on a stone plinth, with stone dressings, a modillion eaves cornice, and a tile roof with a coped gable at the rear. There are three storeys and two bays. In the centre is a round-arched doorway with a moulded surround and a fanlight, and the windows are tripartite sashes. | II |
| 34 and 36 Castle Gate; 52.95119°N 1.15079°W | | Early 18th century | A house, later offices, in red brick on a rendered plinth, with painted stone dressings, sill bands, a moulded eaves cornice, and a tile roof with a blue brick coped gable. There are three storeys and attics, and four bays. The doorway has a fanlight and a hood on iron brackets, and to the right is a passage entry with a wrought iron gate and overthrow. The windows are sashes; they and the passage entry have wedge lintels with keystones, and in the attic are two box dormers. | II |
| 44 High Pavement; 52.95093°N 1.14284°W | | Early 18th century | A house, later used for other purposes, in red brick on a rendered plinth, with painted stone dressings, and a tile roof. There are three storeys and a double depth plan, with a front range of two bays. The doorway has a fanlight and a pediment, and the windows are a mix of sashes and cross casements, those in the lower two floors with panelled wedge lintels and double keystones. At the rear is a round-arched stair window. | II |
| 6 Weekday Cross; 52.95199°N 1.14619°W | — | Early 18th century | A house, later used for other purposes, it is roughcast and colourwashed, on a plinth, with painted stone dressings, a sill band, an eaves cornice, and a tile roof with a single coped gable. There are three storeys, a double range plan and three bays. The round-headed doorway has a fanlight and a keystone. It is flanked by windows with moulded surrounds and lintels, and the upper floor windows include tripartite sashes. | II |
| Castlegate Chambers; 52.95132°N 1.15051°W | | Early 18th century | A house, later offices, in red brick on a rusticated plinth, with a moulded eaves cornice, and a tile roof with blue brick coped gables. There are three storeys and attics and two bays. The doorway has a fanlight and a pediment. To its left is a round-arched sash window, and to the right is a Venetian window. Above are two Venetian windows, the top floor contains two three-light casement windows, and in the attic are two pedimented dormers. | II |
| Exchange House; 52.95346°N 1.15187°W | | Early 18th century | A house, later offices, in red brick, the ground floor painted and the gables rendered, with a modillion cornice, and slate roofs with coped gables. The front has three storeys and attics and three bays, and the left return has two storeys and attics and six bays. On the front is an arcade with two square stucco columns, and a late 20th-century shop front, and above are sash windows, those in the top floor with keystones. In the left return is a brick band, a doorway with a cornice, and segmental-headed cross casement windows. | II |
| Oriel Chambers; 52.95384°N 1.14913°W | | Early 18th century | A pair of houses, later converted into shops, in red brick, partly painted, with dressings in painted stone and stucco, and a roof of tile and stone slate with a coped gable. There are four storeys and four bays. In the ground floor is an arcade with two Doric columns and two altered columns, behind which are shop fronts and an entrance. The bay above the entrance contains a round-arched niche with a swan-neck pediment, over which is a blind panel with a frieze and a wavy cornice, and a roundel with four keystones. The left two bays contain floor bands, and sash windows with keystones, and in the wider right bay is a three-storey oriel window with a dentilled cornice, containing an inscribed stucco panel. | II |
| County House; 52.95110°N 1.14449°W | | c. 1728 | The house was built on the site of an earlier house, retaining earlier fabric including timber framing. It was extended in 1883 to form judges' lodgings, and it has since been extended further and used for other purposes. The building is in stuccoed brick with stone dressings, and has hipped slate roofs. There is a U-shaped plan, with a range of two blocks facing the street, and later extensions to the rear. The earlier block has three storeys and a basement, and a symmetrical front of six bays, the middle two bays recessed. It is on a plinth, with floor bands, and eaves on carved brackets. The central round-arched doorway has a rusticated surround and a decorative fanlight, and above it is a wrought iron lamp holder, and the windows are sashes. The extension of 1833 has two storeys, three bays and a pediment. In the ground floor is an open colonnade with two cast iron fluted Greek Doric columns and a full entablature, and the upper floor contains tall sash windows separated by giant Doric pilasters. | II* |
| Lion Hotel and caves 52.95417°N 1.14763°W | | c. 1730 | The public house, later used for other purposes, is in red brick, stuccoed at the front, with stucco dressings, sill bands, a moulded eaves cornice, and a tile roof. There are four storeys and three bays. The ground floor has elaborate glazed tiles, an entrance with pilaster on the right, and three plate glass windows to the left, above which is a fascia cornice on brackets and the name in raised tiles. The upper floors contain sash windows, those in the first and second floors with cornices, in the first floor bracketed. Under the building are two levels of caves, or cellars, hewn out of the rock. | II |
| 24 and 26 Low Pavement; 52.95144°N 1.14714°W | | 1733–34 | A pair of houses, later offices, in red brick, with painted stone dressings, a moulded eaves cornice and tile roofs. There are three storeys and attics and a double depth plan, with a front range of eight bays. There are two doorways with pediments, the left in Doric style, the right in Ionic style. The windows are sashes with moulded surrounds and cornice keystones, and in the attic are four hipped dormers. At the rear are a sill band, a modillion eaves cornice, four storeys, five bays, and a gabled wing on the left. The central doorway has a fanlight and a pediment on scroll brackets, and the windows are sashes with shaped lintels. | II* |
| Gate and railings, 24 and 26 Low Pavement; 52.95149°N 1.14711°W | | 1733–34 | The railings and gates to the forecourt of the houses are in wrought iron on a chamfered stone plinth. In front of No. 24 is a rectangular enclosure, the railing forming the balustrade to the steps, and to the right is a round-arched gateway to the basement entrance. No. 26 has a rounded enclosure with scroll supports to the railing, and a round-arched gate with openwork piers, an overthrow and a crest. | II* |
| Willoughby House; 52.95138°N 1.14740°W | | c. 1734 | The house, later offices, is in red brick on a plinth, with stone dressings, chamfered quoins, a moulded eaves cornice, and a coped parapet. There are three storeys and a basement, and five bays. The central doorway has Roman Doric columns, a moulded keystone, and a broken segmental pediment. The windows are sashes with moulded surrounds and keystones. | II* |
| Railings and gate, Willoughby House; 52.95147°N 1.14739°W | | c. 1734 | The railings and gate to the forecourt of the house are in wrought iron, and consist of segmental-arched double gates with openwork piers and finials. These areflanked by ramped spearhead railings on a low brick wall with chamfered stone coping. | II* |
| Retaining wall, steps and railings, Hollowstone; 52.95114°N 1.14205°W | | c. 1740 | The wall is in rendered brick, with stone coping, and a spiked wrought iron railing. It varies in height, and contains two segmental-arched openings, a garage opening with a lintel and two segmental-arched doorways. At the east end is a flight of steps with a balustrade and railings. | II |
| 20 St James' Street; 52.95304°N 1.15252°W | | c. 1750 | A house, later a shop, in red brick, with a wooden eaves cornice and a slate roof. There are three storeys and five bays. In the ground floor is a shop front, and the upper floors contain sash windows with flat brick arches, five in the middle floor and three in the top floor. | II |
| Railings and gate, Churchill House; 52.95420°N 1.14326°W | | c. 1750 | The railings and gate are in cast and wrought iron. In the centre is a segmental-arched double gate with openwork piers surmounted by masks, scrolls and urn-shaped finials, and an overthrow. Flanking the gate are spearhead railings with urn-shaped finials, on a brick retaining wall with chamfered stone coping. | II |
| People's Hall; 52.95433°N 1.14315°W | | 1750 | Two houses, later altered, known as Morley House and used for other purposes, in red brick, partly rendered, with painted stone dressings and slate roofs. The main building has a rendered plinth, quoins, a sill band, an eaves band, and a rendered parapet. There are three storeys and five bays. The central doorway has a rusticated surround, a double keystone, and a pediment. The windows are sashes with wedge lintels and double keystones. On the right return are three gables and a round-arched doorway. The lower building to the left has three storeys and five bays, and a door on the left. The lintels are wedge shaped in the ground floor, plain in the middle floor, and in the top floor are wedge lintels with double keystones. The roof is a double-hipped clerestory. | II* |
| 10 and 11 Angel Row; 52.95371°N 1.15252°W | | Mid 18th century | A house, later a shop, in red brick, with stone dressings, sill bands, a moulded cornice and a parapet. There are four storeys and three bays. In the ground floor is a late 20th-century shop front and an entry under a fascia, and the upper floors contain sash windows in moulded surrounds. In the first floor is a large bracket clock. | II |
| 28 and 30 Carlton Street; 52.95353°N 1.14424°W | | Mid 18th century | Two houses, later used for other purposes, in red brick with stone dressings, an eaves cornice, and a slate roof with a coped gable. There are three storeys and five bays. In the ground floor is a late 20th-century shop front. The upper floors contain sash windows, those in the middle bay in a recessed segmental arch. | II |
| 32 Carlton Street; 52.95353°N 1.14410°W | | Mid 18th century | A house, later used for other purposes, in red brick, with painted stone dressings, sill bands, a stucco modillion eaves cornice, and a slate roof with a single coped gable. There are four storeys and three bays. In the ground floor is a modern shop front, and the upper floors contain sash windows with shaped lintels and paterae. | II |
| 17 Castle Gate; 52.95131°N 1.14986°W | | Mid 18th century | A house, later offices, in red brick on a plinth, with stone dressings, rusticated quoins forming pilasters, sill bands, floor bands, a dentilled eaves cornice, a parapet and a slate roof. There are three storeys and a basement, four bays, and rear wings. The doorway is in the form of a Venetian window, it is round-headed with pilasters, a fanlight with a keystone, and side windows. The other windows are sashes with shaped lintels and keystones. | II |
| 14 High Pavement; 52.95102°N 1.14488°W | | Mid 18th century | A house, later offices, in red brick, with painted stone dressings, a modillion cornice and a slate mansard roof. There are three storeys, a basement and attics, and three bays. In the right bay is a doorway with an ornamental blind fanlight and a keystone, and a dentilled pediment on brackets. The windows are sashes with wedge lintels and keystones, and in the attic are slate-hung gabled dormers. | II |
| 26 High Pavement; 52.95086°N 1.14370°W | | Mid 18th century | A house, later offices, in red brick on a plinth, with stone dressings, quoins, a sill band, a modillion eaves cornice, a panelled balustrade and slate roofs. There are three storeys and five bays. The central doorway has a plain frieze and a pediment, and the windows are sashes with flat brick arches and keystones. At the rear is a full-height semicircular bay window. | II |
| 54 High Pavement; 52.95102°N 1.14241°W | | Mid 18th century | A house, later offices, in red brick, on a plinth, with painted stone dressings, sill bands, a dentilled cornice, a parapet with a rendered panel, and a slate gambrel roof. There are four storeys and three bays. In the ground floor are three linked sash windows under a common cornice, and two doorways to the right. In each of the first and second floors are three linked Venetian windows, and the top floor contains two Diocletian windows with a round-headed window between them. | II |
| 56 High Pavement; 52.95104°N 1.14223°W | | Mid 18th century | A vicarage, later offices, in red brick on a plinth, with painted stone dressings, a sill band, a moulded eaves cornice, a blocking course and a tile roof. There are three storeys and five bays, the middle bay projecting slightly. In the centre is a doorway with a stucco surround, a fanlight, and a cornice on brackets, and to the left is a carriage entrance with a brick and stone surround, and wrought iron gates. The windows are sashes with flat brick arches, those in the middle bay with moulded surrounds. | II |
| 3 and 5 Hounds Gate; 52.95207°N 1.14941°W | | Mid 18th century | A house, later shops and offices, in painted brick with stone dressings, sill bands, a dentilled eaves cornice and a slate roof. There are four storeys and four bays. In the ground floor are two late 20th-century shop fronts with a recessed central doorway. The middle two floors contain sash windows with wedge lintels and keystones, and in the top floor are studio windows. | II |
| 7 and 9 Hounds Gate; 52.95203°N 1.14952°W | | Mid 18th century | A house, later shops and offices, in painted brick, with painted stone dressings, sill bands, a dentilled eaves cornice and a slate roof. There are four storeys and four bays. In the ground floor are two 20th-century shop fronts, and the upper floors contain sash windows with wedge lintels and double keystones. | II |
| 11 Hounds Gate; 52.95198°N 1.14965°W | | Mid 18th century | A house, later a shop and offices, in painted brick, with painted stone dressings, floor bands, a dentilled eaves cornice and an asphalt roof. There are four storeys and three bays. In the ground floor is a doorway with pilasters and an open pediment, to its left is a shop front, and a passage entrance. The upper floors contain sash windows with wedge lintels and double keystones. | II |
| 12 Low Pavement and railings 52.95147°N 1.14789°W | | Mid 18th century | A house, later offices, in painted stucco, the ground floor rusticated, with dentilled ground floor and eaves cornices, and a panelled coped parapet. There are four storeys and a basement, and five bays, the middle bay projecting. In the centre is a portico with double Corinthian columns and a balustrade, and a door with a fanlight. The windows in the first and second floors are sashes, those in the first floor with cornices on shaped brackets, and those in the second floor with eared architraves and shaped lintels. In the top floor are casement windows with moulded surrounds, and the basement has four round-arched windows with voussoirs. Outside, there is a wrought iron area railing on a chamfered stone plinth. | II |
| 4 St Peter's Church Walk; 52.95229°N 1.14795°W | | Mid 18th century | A house, later offices, in red brick, partly roughcast, the ground floor stuccoed, on a plinth, with a ground floor cornice and a slate roof. There are three storeys and an L-shaped plan, with a front range of five bays and a rear wing. The central doorway has a fanlight, and a round-arched stucco hood on brackets. In the left of the middle floor is a canted oriel window, and the other windows are sashes, those to the left of the doorway with moulded surrounds. | II |
| 2 Short Hill; 52.95124°N 1.14139°W | | Mid 18th century | A house, later used for other purposes, in red brick, the left two bays rendered, on a plinth, with painted stone dressings, a modillion cornice, and a slate roof. There are three storeys and an attic, and five bays. In the centre is a doorway with a fanlight and a pediment on scroll brackets, above which is a Venetian window. The other windows are sashes, those in the right three bays with wedge lintels and keystones. In the attic is a continuous row of tilting casement windows. | II |
| Churchyard wall, railings and gates, St Mary's Church; 52.95127°N 1.14243°W | | Mid 18th century | The church walls are in brick on a stone plinth and have stone coping, and wrought iron spiked railings with cast iron supports. On the south side is an elliptical-arched doorway, at the south end of the east side is a flight of steps leading to a gateway with cast iron posts and a wrought iron lamp holder, and on the north side are two gates. | II |
| Eldon Chambers; 52.95243°N 1.15024°W | | Mid 18th century | A house later used for other purposes, in red brick with painted stone dressings, a sill band, a moulded eaves cornice with paired modillions, and a tile roof with coped gables. There are three storeys and attics, four bays, and a rear wing. In the left bay is a round-arched carriage entrance, with a datestone, a monogram and a lettered panel, and to its right is a late 20th-century shop front. The right bay of the middle floor contains a canted bay window with a dentilled cornice, and above it is a Diocletian window. In the other bays are sash windows with shaped lintels and double keystones. The rear wing has three storeys and attics, and six bays. | II |
| Old Assembly Rooms; 52.95165°N 1.14784°W | | 18th century | The assembly rooms, later used for other purposes, were altered in 1790 by John Carr, and refronted in 1836. The building is in brick, with painted stone on the front, the ground floor is rusticated, and it is on a plinth, with an entablature, a modillion cornice, and a pierced balustrade. In the left bay is a doorway with a traceried fanlight, and to the right are cross-casement windows. The upper floors are divided by three-quarter fluted Corinthian columns, and the windows are sashes, those in the middle floor with cornices on scroll brackets. | II |
| Bromley House; 52.95364°N 1.15233°W | | 1752 | A house, later a library and shops, in red brick, with stone dressings, a string course, an eaves cornice, and a tile roof with coped gables. There are three storeys, a basement and attics, a front range of five bays, and a rear wing. The central doorway has a moulded surround, an elaborate semicircular fanlight, and a moulded cornice on consoles, and it is flanked by late 20th-century shop fronts. The windows are sashes with moulded surrounds, those in the middle floor with architraves and triangular pediments, and there are three gabled dormers. The rear wing has three storeys and nine bays, and a two-storey extension. It contains a round-headed doorway with a fanlight and a Gibbs surround. | II* |
| 19 Castle Gate; 52.95122°N 1.15003°W | | 1755 | A house on a corner site, later offices, in red brick on a plinth, with stone dressings, quoins, a pseudo-parapet with balustrades over the ground floor, a frieze, a modillion cornice, and a panelled coped parapet. There are three storeys and five bays, the middle bay projecting slightly. In the centre is a tripartite doorway with double columns, a fanlight, a decorated frieze and a pediment. Above it is a large round-headed tripartite window with Ionic pilasters and an elaborate fanlight. The other windows are sashes, with panelled wedge lintels and keystones. In the centre at the rear is a full-height half-round bay window, and the windows are sashes with moulded architraves. In the middle of the right return is a doorway with a fanlight and a pediment. | II* |
| Enfield House and wall 52.95147°N 1.14758°W | | 1760 | A house, later offices, in red brick, with painted stone dressings, an elaborate modillion eaves cornice, and a slate roof with coped gables. There are three storeys and a basement, two bays and later a rear wing. On the right, steps lead up to a round-arched doorway with Ionic columns, a fanlight, a double keystone and a dentilled pediment. In each floor there are two Venetian windows. The front area is enclosed by a coped stone wall with channelled rustication and railings. In the basement are rock-hewn cellars. | II* |
| Lace Market Theatre; 52.95171°N 1.14502°W | | 1760 | A chapel, later a school and subsequently a theatre, in red brick, stuccoed at the front, on a plinth, with a tile roof and a coped gable at the rear. There are two storeys, a front of four bays and five bays on the sides. On the front is a cornice, and an elaborately shaped gable with a finial. In the centre is a doorway with pilasters, a fanlight and a pediment, flanked by false windows and blocked doorways with fanlights. The upper floor contains a central blank panel flanked by windows, all with cornices. | II |
| 34 to 40 Carlton Street; 52.95358°N 1.14390°W | | c. 1770 | Four houses with workshops, later shops and offices, in red brick, with painted stone dressings, sill bands, a modillion eaves cornice and slate roofs. There are four storeys and attics, and seven bays. In the ground floor are 20th-century shop fronts, and the upper floors contain sash windows with wedge lintels, those in the first and second floors also with cornice keystones. In the attics are continuous swing casement windows. | II |
| 9 and 11 St James' Street; 52.95303°N 1.15231°W | | c. 1770 | Two houses, later warehouses, then a public house, in red brick, the ground floor painted, with painted stone dressings, sill bands, modillion eaves and a slate roof. There are four storeys, a front range of seven bays, and rear extensions. There are two doorways with fanlights and pediments, and to the left is a round-headed doorway with a keystone. The upper floors contain sash windows, those in the middle two floors with wedge lintels and cornice keystones. | II |
| 17 St James' Street; 52.95283°N 1.15258°W | | c. 1770 | A house, later used for other purposes, in red brick, the ground floor rendered, with stone dressings, a sill band, modillion eaves and a slate roof. There are three storeys and four bays. In the ground floor is a late 20th-century shop front with an entry to its left, and the upper floors contain casement windows, those in the middle floor with wedge lintels and keystones. | II |
| Shire Hall and County Gaol; 52.95083°N 1.14424°W | | 1770–72 | The building was designed by James Gandon, and later extended and reimodelled. It is in stone with slate roofs, and beneath it are extensive rock-hewn caves. The central block has two storeys, seven bays, a dentilled cornice and a pierced balustrade. The middle three bays project and are divided by giant Ionic half-columns. There is a central round-arched doorway with a keystone flanked by round-arched casement windows. Above the doorway is a rectangular blind panel flanked by roundels, all with moulded surrounds. Above is a frieze with craved symbols, and a panelled parapet with a datestone. To the left is an entrance with paired Ionic columns, and a parapet with a coat of arms. To the right is a projecting stair turret with a rusticated basement and paired Ionic angle pilasters, surmounted by a square lead dome with a cast iron crest. | II* |
| 37, 39 and 41 Bridlesmith Gate and 2, 4 and 6 Byard Lane; 52.95196°N 1.14696°W | | Late 18th century | A house on a corner site, later used for other purposes, rendered and colourwashed, with a hipped slate roof. It is in three and four storeys, with fronts of three and six bays. In the ground floor are shop fronts and windows, and on Bridlesmith Lane is a round-arched passage entrance. The windows are sashes, those on Bridlesmith Gate are tripartite, and on Byard Lane some are blanks. | II |
| 3 Carlton Street; 52.95367°N 1.14496°W | | Late 18th century | A house on a corner site, later a shop, in red brick, with painted stone dressings, a sill band, an eaves cornice, and a hipped slate roof. There are four storeys, fronts of six and two bays, and a rounded bay on the corner. In the ground floor are 19th-century shop fronts with panelled pilasters. The windows are sashes with flat brick arches, those in the middle two floors in recessed segmental-headed arches. The bays between, and those on the right return, contain blanks. | II |
| 24 and 26 Carlton Street; 52.95351°N 1.14436°W | | Late 18th century | Two houses, later a shop, in red brick, with painted stone dressings, dentilled moulded eaves, and slate roofs. There are three storeys and an attic, and three bays, the right bay slightly recessed. In the ground floor is a late 20th-century shop front, the upper floors contain sash windows with panelled wedge lintels and double keystones, and in the attic are two hipped dormers. | II |
| 10, 12 and 12A Castle Gate and former lace factory 52.95150°N 1.14993°W | | Late 18th century | A house, later shops and offices, in red brick, with stone dressings, a moulded eaves cornice and a slate roof. There are four storeys and six bays. In the ground floor are shop fronts, and the upper floors contain sash windows with flat brick arches. | II |
| 28 High Pavement; 52.95086°N 1.14362°W | | Late 18th century | A house, later offices, in red brick, the ground floor rendered, on a plinth, with a ground floor cornice, a sill band, brick eaves, and a slate roof with coped gables. In the ground floor, on the right, is a doorway with a fanlight, and on the left is a passage entry. The windows are sashes, those in the upper two floors with segmental heads. | II |
| 29 High Pavement and railings 52.95102°N 1.14405°W | | Late 18th century | A house, later used for other purposes, in red brick on a plinth, with stone dressings, a minor and a major cornice, and a blocking course. There are three storeys, a basement and attics, and three bays. In the right bay is a stone porch with an entablature and a door with a fanlight. The windows are sashes with flat brick arches, and there are two basement openings. In front are wrought iron area railings on a stone plinth. | II |
| 38 and 40 High Pavement; 52.95087°N 1.14326°W | | Late 18th century | A pair of houses, later used for other purposes, they are stuccoed, on a plinth, with stone dressings and slate roofs. There are three storeys and attics, and four bays. In the ground floor are two doorways, one with a fanlight, to the right is a shop window, and between them is a passage entry with a segmental head and a gabled hood. The windows are sashes, and in the attic are two hipped dormers. | II |
| 46 and 48 High Pavement; 52.95095°N 1.14270°W | | Late 18th century | A pair of houses, later offices, in roughcast brick, on a rendered plinth, with floor bands, rebated eaves and a slate roof. There are three storeys and four bays. The two doorways have segmental heads, and the windows are a mix of sashes and casements, some with segmental heads. | II |
| 50 and 52 High Pavement; 52.95099°N 1.14256°W | — | Late 18th century | A pair of houses, later offices, in red brick on a rendered plinth, with painted stone dressings, an eaves cornice and a tile roof. There are three storeys and four bays. The doorway has a stone surround and a fanlight, and the windows are sashes with flat brick arches. | II |
| 50 and 51 Long Row West; 52.95385°N 1.15177°W | | Late 18th century | A pair of houses, later a shop, in red brick, with painted stone dressings, a floor band, a moulded cornice, a blue brick parapet, and a hipped slate roof. There are four storeys and four bays. In the ground floor is an arcade, with four stuccoed Doric columns and a late 20th-century shop front. The windows are sashes with stuccoed surrounds. | II |
| 52 Long Row West; 52.95390°N 1.15188°W | | Late 18th century | A house, later a shop, in red brick, with painted stone dressings, floor bands, a stucco cornice, a blue brick parapet and a hipped slate roof. There are four storeys and two bays. In the ground floor is an arcade with two cast iron columns. The first floor contains a shop window with a stucco surround and a flat hood, and above are sash windows with stucco surrounds. | II |
| 1 Middle Pavement; 52.95163°N 1.14684°W | | Late 18th century | A house, later a shop and offices, in red brick with stone dressings, slate hanging in the left return, and a brick parapet. There are four storeys and two bays. In the ground floor is a doorway with a rusticated surround, a fanlight, and a double keystone, and to its right is a plate glass shop window. Above is a canted round-arched oriel window on brackets, and the top two floors contain sash windows. | II |
| 27 St Mary's Gate; 52.95209°N 1.14407°W | | Late 18th century | A stuccoed house, later an office, on a plinth, with a sill band and a slate roof. There are three storeys and attics, and five bays, the left bay narrower and recessed. In the ground floor is a round-headed doorway with a fanlight, to the right are two round-headed windows, and to the left is a garage door. In the upper floors, the four main bays are divided by pilasters and contain sash windows, with balustrades below the middle floor windows. Above them is a dentilled cornice, and a frieze with swags and roundels. In the attic are panels containing round windows. | II |
| 1 Short Hill; 52.95127°N 1.14121°W | | Late 18th century | A house, later offices, in stucco and brick on a plinth, with stone dressings and a slate roof. There are three storeys and a basement, and a front of two bays. In the ground floor is a round-arched doorway in the form of a Venetian window, in the upper floors are sash windows, and there are two shouldered basement openings. In the left return are sash windows with segmental heads, and at the rear is a 19th-century brick extension with three storeys and five bays. | II |
| Churchill House; 52.95420°N 1.14310°W | | Late 18th century | The house is in stuccoed brick on a plinth, with painted stone dressings and a slate roof. There are three storeys and four bays. The doorway has a round-arched head, and the windows are sashes. | II |
| King's Court; 52.95062°N 1.14282°W | | Late 18th century | A group of warehouses and offices that have hen extended and altered to form offices and flats. They are in red brick on a plinth, with stone dressings, a moulded cornice, a brick parapet, and artificial slate roofs. The buildings vary in size and height. The north front, facing Commerce Square, has three storeys and 14 bays, the south front, facing Cliff Road, has eight storeys and 14 bays, and a rendered basement with eight openings, and there are smaller blocks. The windows are sashes with flat brick arches, and the doorways have brick round-arched heads. | II |
| Roberts Yard; 52.95085°N 1.14343°W | | Late 18th century | A group of five houses, later used for other purposes, in brick, stucco and stone, on a plinth, with slate roofs. The front facing the street has three storeys and seven bays, and there are rear wings linking to a house at the back, forming a courtyard. Most of the windows are sashes, some with segmental heads, and there is an attic storey with continuous glazing. On the front is a round-arched passage entry with vermiculated voussoirs, a mask keystone and a wrought iron gate. In the courtyard is a doorway with a reeded surround, a fanlight and a cornice on brackets. At the rear are three storeys, five bays, a string course, a sill band, a modillion cornice and a parapet. | II |
| Urquhart House; 52.95125°N 1.14532°W | | Late 18th century | A house, later converted for other uses, in rendered brick on a plinth, with sill bands, and a slate roof. There are two storeys and attics, and five bays. In the centre is a doorway with a fanlight, above which is a casement window, and it is flanked by two-storey canted bay windows. To the left are narrow casement windows, to the right is a cart entrance, and in the attic are two gabled dormers. | II |
| Bridge over canal 52.94083°N 1.13902°W | | 1792–93 | The bridge carries Meadow Lane over the Nottingham Canal, it is in stone and consists of a single elliptical arch. The bridge has a string course, and splayed parapet walls with half-round coping. On the northeast side is a fluted cast iron roller. | II |
| Turnover Bridge; 52.95382°N 1.14634°W | | 1792–96 | The roving bridge carries a station approach over the Nottingham Canal. It is in stone with a cast iron balustrade, and consists of a single elliptical arch with an impost band. The ramp from the towpath on the west side is straight, on the east side it is curved, and both have half-round coping on the retaining walls. | II |
| 29 and 31 Castle Gate; 52.95096°N 1.15094°W | | 1794 | Two houses, later used for other purposes, in red brick on a plinth, with stone dressings, sill bands, a modillion eaves cornice and a tile roof. There are four storeys and five bays. In the centre are four Ionic columns, three round-arches and two pediments, containing a central round-headed doorway flanked by windows, all with fanlights. Above are two tripartite windows each with a pseudo-balustrade, the lower one with a pediment. The other windows are sashes with moulded architraves. | II |
| St Mary's School; 52.95222°N 1.14161°W | | 1799 | A Baptist chapel converted into a school in 1884–86 by T. C. Hine. It is in red brick and stucco, on a plinth, with stone dressings, quoins, an eaves cornice, and a slate roof with coped gables. There are two storeys and nine bays. Most of the windows are sashes, some with round- or segmental-arched heads, and some with moulded surrounds. | II |
| 16 and 17 Angel Row; 52.95356°N 1.15212°W | | c. 1800 | A house with a workshop, later shops and offices, in painted brick with stone dressings and a slate mansard roof. The front range has four storeys and attic and four bays, and at the rear is a courtyard flanked by three- and two-storey buildings. In the ground floor are late 20th-century shop fronts, above the left shop front is an older two-light shop window with pilasters and a cornice. The other windows are sashes, and in the roof is a seven-light workshop window. In the courtyard is a Tudor arched doorway. | II |
| 20 and 22 Carlton Street; 52.95350°N 1.14454°W | | c. 1800 | A pair of houses, later shops and offices, in painted brick, with painted stone dressings, a wooden eaves cornice, and a slate roof. There are three storeys and four bays. In the ground floor, to the left is an early 20th-century shop front with a recessed central doorway and a fascia, to the right is a late 20th-century shop front, and between them is a round-arched entry. The upper floors contain sash windows with wedge lintels and keystones. | II |
| 16 Clumber Street; 52.95422°N 1.14738°W | — | c. 1800 | A house, later a shop, in painted brick with stone dressings and a sill band. There are four storeys and three bays. In the ground floor is a late 20th-century shop front, and the upper floors contain sash windows, the middle window in the first floor in a round-arched recess with half-pilasters and an ornamental tympanum. | II |
| 27 Pelham Street; 52.95372°N 1.14579°W | | c. 1800 | A house, later a shop, in painted brick, with painted stone dressings, a sill band, moulded brick eaves and a slate roof. There are three storeys and three bays. In the ground floor is a shop front dating from about 1880, with fluted pilasters, fascia brackets, and a recessed doorway with a fanlight. To its left is an entry opening and a stone column. The upper floors contain sash windows, those in the middle floor with wedge lintels and double keystones. | II |
| 6 and 8 Plumptre Street; 52.95166°N 1.14187°W | | c. 1800 | A row of houses, extended in the early 19th century, and later used as warehouses and workshops, they are in red brick on a rendered plinth, with slate roofs and have three storeys. The earlier block on the right has three bays, and contains sash windows, some with segmental heads. The extension to the left is taller, with a single bay, and contains a doorway approached by steps, and to the left is a segmental-headed doorway with a fanlight. In the upper floors are segmental-headed sash windows. | II |
| Old Angel Public House; 52.95337°N 1.14347°W | | c. 1800 | A pair of town houses, on a corner site, converted into a public house, in painted stucco and stone, with stucco dressings, a ground floor cornice and slate roofs. There are three storeys and fronts of five and four bays. In the ground floor on Stoney Street are a doorway and windows with granite shafts, and a shouldered fanlight flanked by roundels. To the right is a shop window and an angled doorway on the corner. The upper floors contain sash windows with decorative lintels and keystones, and here is a panel with the name in raised lettering. On Woolpack Lane the ground floor windows have moulded surrounds, and the upper floor windows have round-arched heads. | II |
| Old Dog and Partridge Public House; 52.95512°N 1.14639°W | | c. 1800 | A house on a corner site converted into a public house, it is stuccoed, with a painted glazed tile shop front in the ground floor, quoins, moulded eaves, and a hipped slate roof. There are three storeys and fronts of three bays. The doorway is recessed and angled on the corner, with faience Ionic columns. The windows on the ground floor are cross-casements with mullions, and the upper floors contain sash windows. | II |
| 5 and 7 Pelham Street; 52.95379°N 1.14710°W | — | c. 1810 | A pair of houses, later shops and flats, stuccoed, with a coped parapet. There are three storeys and four bays. In the ground floor are two shop fronts under a common fascia cornice on brackets. The left shop front dates from about 1900, on a granite plinth, the door recessed, and flanked by plate glass windows with arched top lights. The upper floors contain sash windows. | II |
| 22 and 24 St James' Street; 52.95299°N 1.15263°W | | c. 1820 | A pair of houses, later shops, in red brick, with painted stone dressings, a sill band and a tile roof. There are three storeys and four bays. In the ground floor are shop fronts under a full-length fascia. In the middle floor are sash windows, and the top floor contains tilting casements, all with wedge lintels and double keystones. | II |
| Plumptre Hospital, wall and railings 52.95093°N 1.13980°W | | 1823 | The former almshouses and master's house are in painted stucco, on a plinth, with a moulded eaves cornice, and hipped slate roofs. The main block has two storeys and five bay, the middle bay projecting under a gable, and rear wings. The middle bay contains a doorway with a chamfered surround and a four-centred arched head, above it is an inscribed panel, and in the gable apex is a roundel. The outer bays contain mullioned cast iron casement windows, and all the openings have hood moulds. The block is linked to the former house that has two storeys and three bays. This contains a doorway, a sash window, and other windows similar to the main block. In front is a stuccoed boundary wall with wrought iron railings and square piers. | II |
| 51 Bridlesmith Gate; 52.95163°N 1.14694°W | | Early 19th century | A shop on a corner site in roughcast brick, with an eaves cornice on paired brackets, and a hipped slate roof. There are four storeys, three bays and a rounded front. In the centre is a canted shop front under a fretwork fascia cornice on elaborate brackets. It is flanked by windows with roundels above, and to the left is a doorway. The upper floors contain sash windows. | II |
| 27 Broad Street; 52.95472°N 1.14459°W | | Early 19th century | A house with a workshop, later a shop, in brick with stone dressings and a slate roof. There are three storeys and two bays. In the ground floor is a shop front with pilasters and a cornice on brackets, and a cross mullioned shop window, and to its left is an entry. The upper floors contain sash windows with painted wedge lintels and keystones. At the rear are large casement windows. | II |
| 2 to 10 Goose Gate; 52.95363°N 1.14346°W | | Early 19th century | A row of five houses, later shops, in red brick with stone dressings, a wooden eaves cornice, and a slate roof. There are three storeys and seven bays. The middle shop front dates from the late 19th century, and has pilasters and a fascia cornice on brackets, and the other shop fronts date from the late 20th century. In the upper floors there are sash windows and blanks, all with decorated wedge lintels and keystones. | II |
| 31 High Pavement; 52.95107°N 1.14390°W | | Early 19th century | A house on a corner site, later used for other purposes, in red brick on a plinth, with stone and stucco dressings, a sill band, an eaves cornice, and a hipped slate roof. There are four storeys and a basement, fronts of three and seven bays, and a segmental-curved bay on the corner. The doorway has a fanlight, and the windows are sashes with flat brick arches. | II |
| 42 High Pavement, 2 Commerce Square; 52.95085°N 1.14305°W | | Early 19th century | A warehouse, later offices, in red brick, partly rendered, on a plinth, with stone dressings, an eaves cornice, and slate roofs with coped gables. There are four storeys, a square plan, and fronts of five bays. The four right bays of the main block are recessed and rendered, and contain a doorway with a fanlight and sash windows. The left return has a sill band, and contains a doorway with voussoirs, and at the rear is a garage door. | II |
| 5 Kaye's Walk, 49 St Mary's Gate; 52.95155°N 1.14390°W | | Early 19th century | A pair of houses on a corner site, later offices, in red brick on a stone plinth, with a moulded eaves cornice and a slate roof. There are three storeys and fronts of three bays. The doorways have fanlights, and the windows are sashes with flat brick arches. | II |
| 1 Plumptre Street; 52.95175°N 1.14207°W | | Early 19th century | Two houses, later workrooms, in red brick on a chamfered and ramped stone plinth, with stone dressings and a slate roof. There are four storeys and five bays. The doorway has a fanlight, and the windows are sashes with wedge lintels and keystones. | II |
| 2 and 2A Stoney Street; 52.95350°N 1.14371°W | | Early 19th century | A pair of houses, later shops and houses, in red brick on a plinth, with stone dressings, a sill band, a dentilled cornice and a slate roof. There are three storeys and three bays. In the ground floor is a doorway with a cornice keystone, flanked by shop fronts with pilasters and cornices, the left with a recessed side door, the right with a mullioned shop window. In the middle floor, on the right, is a cross casement window, and the other windows are sashes with wedge lintels and cornice keystones. | II |
| County Tavern; 52.95102°N 1.14416°W | | Early 19th century | A town house, later part of a public house, in red brick on a plinth, with painted stone dressings, sill bands, deep eaves and a slate roof. There are four storeys and four bays. In the ground floor is an elliptical-arched carriage entrance with a shaped keystone and cast iron gates. The windows are sashes with shaped lintels. | II |
| 8 George Street; 52.95411°N 1.14475°W | | 1827–28 | A chapel designed by Edward Willson, later used for other purposes, in red brick, the front in stone, on a rendered plinth, with quoins and a slate roof. There are two storeys, three bays on the front and five on the sides. The entrance front has a floor band and a pediment, and contains a cross-mullioned window flanked by doorways with fanlights, above which are three tripartite Gothic windows with transoms. | II |
| 10 George Street; 52.95419°N 1.14486°W | | 1827 | A presbytery, later an office, designed by Edward Willson, in red brick on a plinth, with painted stone dressings, a sill band, and a slate roof with coped gables. There are three storeys and two bays. In the left bay is a two-storey canted bay window, and to its right is a recessed doorway with a fanlight and a garage. Above these is a sash window, in the top floor are tilting casements, and all the windows have flat brick arches. | II |
| 23 and 23A Barker Gate; 52.95263°N 1.14122°W | | c. 1830 | A pair of houses with workshops in red brick with stucco dressings and a slate roof. There are three storeys and attics, and four bays. The doorway has an elliptical arch, and the windows are sashes with wedge lintels and double keystones in the lower two floors, and with flat arches in the top floor. In the attic is a continuous workshop window. | II |
| 15 Carlton Street; 52.95366°N 1.14417°W | | c. 1830 | A house, later a shop, in painted brick, with painted stone dressings, deep eaves and a slate roof. There are three storeys and two bays. In the ground floor is a stone-clad shop front, and the upper floors contain sash windows with fluted lintels and keystones. Between the windows is a hanging sign with a clock, and above it is a gilt and wrought iron pawnbroker's sign. | II |
| 11 Low Pavement; 52.95164°N 1.14762°W | | 1836 | A stuccoed bank, designed by Thomas Hawksley, on a plinth, with giant Doric pilasters, a frieze with wreaths, and a plain cornice. There are two storeys and five bays. The central doorcase is in stone and in Baroque style. It is gabled, with a rusticated surround, a modillion cornice, and contains a round-arched doorway with Ionic columns, a fanlight and an elongated keystone. The windows are sashes with moulded surrounds and panelled aprons, and to the right is a passage doorway. | II |
| 12 Broad Street; 52.95410°N 1.14387°W | | 1840–41 | A dispensary, later used for other purposes, in painted stucco on a plinth, with a rusticated ground floor, a sill band, a string course and a dentilled cornice. There are two storeys and a basement, and six bays. In the right bay is a doorway with pilasters, a fanlight and a hood, and above it is a canted bay window. In the middle of the other five bays, steps lead up to a recessed doorway with a fanlight, and the bays in the upper floor are divided by giant Ionic pilasters. The windows are sashes, and in the basement are flat-headed windows. | II |
| Gateway east of St Mary's School; 52.95232°N 1.14114°W | | c. 1844 | The gateway is in red brick with stone dressings, and contains a round-headed arch with square piers on plinths, and a gable with a pediment. In the pediment is an inscribed stone panel. | II |
| 30, 32 and 34 Lincoln Street; 52.95460°N 1.14559°W | | c. 1845 | A terrace of three back-to-back houses with knitters' workshops, in red brick with slate roofs. There are two storeys and attics, and three bays. There are three doorways with fanlights, and the windows are sashes, all with segmental heads. In the attics are six two-light casement windows. | II |
| Corn Exchange and Clinton Rooms; 52.95412°N 1.14640°W | | 1849–50 | The corn exchange, later used for other purposes, was designed by T. C. Hine in Italianate style. It is in red brick, with dressings in stone and terracotta, quoins, a ground floor cornice, a minor cornice with a brick frieze, a modillion cornice, and a parapet with patterned brickwork. There are two storeys and five bays, the middle three bays recessed. In the ground floor are round-arched doorways and windows with quoined surrounds and fanlights, and the upper floor contains casement windows with mullions and segmental pediments. | II |
| 3 Broadway; 52.95196°N 1.14340°W | | Mid 19th century | A warehouse, later offices, designed by T. C. Hine, in red brick, the ground floor in stone, on a plinth, with stone dressings, rusticated quoins, a ground floor cornice, sill bands, an eaves cornice, a blue brick coped parapet, and a hipped slate roof. There are four storeys, twelve bays, and a curved façade. The central bay projects and contains a segmental-headed doorway, above which is a large round-headed cross casement window, a Venetian window, and a round-arched casement. Most of the other windows are round-arched casements with moulded surrounds. | II |
| 3 and 4 Kaye's Walk; 52.95154°N 1.14356°W | | Mid 19th century | A warehouse, later offices, in red brick on a plinth, with stone dressings, a sill band, a moulded eaves cornice on brackets, and a slate roof. There are four storeys and nine bays. The doorway has pilasters and an entablature, and the windows are top-hung casements, those in the lower three floors with shaped wedge lintels. | II |
| 13 Low Pavement; 52.95160°N 1.14738°W | | Mid 19th century | A warehouse, later part of a bank, in brick, stuccoed on the front, on a panelled plinth, with a slate roof. There are three storeys and three bays. The windows in the lower two floors are sashes, those in the ground floor with segmental heads in segmental recesses, and in the top floor are casement windows. Two of the ground floor windows have been fitted with cash dispensers. | II |
| 11 St Peter's Gate; 52.95259°N 1.14843°W | | Mid 19th century | An office building in red brick, with painted stone dressings, a stucco cornice and a brick parapet. There are four storeys and four bays, the right bay slightly recessed. The left three bays have a large 20th-century shop front in the ground floor, and the upper floors contain sash windows, in the first floor with cornices on brackets, and those above in eared architraves. The right bay has two round-arched doorways with moulded surrounds, and shafts with mask capitals, and above are paired round-arched sash windows. | II |
| 19 Stoney Street; 52.95303°N 1.14322°W | | Mid 19th century | A warehouse, later used for other purposes, in red brick on a plinth, with stone dressings, floor cornices, a moulded eaves cornice, and a slate roof. There are four storeys and two bays. In the ground floor are two doorways with segmental heads and fanlights. The upper floors contain windows with segmental heads, in the first floor with panelled aprons, and in the top two floors with arched lintels and keystones. | II |
| 39 Stoney Street; 52.95190°N 1.14251°W | | Mid 19th century | A warehouse on a corner site, later offices, in red brick, the ground floor in painted rusticated stone, on a plinth, with dressings in stone and blue brick, a ground floor cornice, quoins on the corner bay, an eaves band, a wrought iron balustrade railing with brick pedestals, and a clerestory roof. There are four storeys, a basement and attics, and fronts of seven and five bays, with a rounded bay on the corner. In the corner bay is a round-headed doorway with pilasters and a pediment on brackets containing a double keystone. The ground floor windows are flat-headed transomed casements, in the upper floors are segmental-arched sashes with continuous hood moulds, and in the attic clerestory is continuous glazing. | II |
| 47 Stoney Street; 52.95173°N 1.14244°W | | Mid 19th century | A factory on a corner site, later offices, in red brick on a chamfered plinth, with stone dressings, quoins on the corner bay, a first floor cornice, an eaves cornice and a blocking course. There are five storeys and a basement, fronts of three and eight bays, and a rounded bay on the corner. The windows are sashes with segmental heads and linked hood moulds. In the corner bay is a doorway converted into a window, with a moulded surround and a segmental pediment. On Stoney Street is a doorway with a fanlight, and on Plumptre Street is a window converted into a loading door, and a doorway with a moulded surround and a fanlight. | II |
| 7 Weekday Cross; 52.95164°N 1.14584°W | | Mid 19th century | A warehouse converted for other purposes, it is in red brick with painted stone dressings, quoins, a ground floor cornice, a floor band, an eaves cornice, and a blocking course. There are four storeys and two blocks, the left recessed with four bays, and the right, taller, with three. The ground floor, which has been altered, contains segmental openings with moulded surrounds, including a former cart entrance. The upper floors contain sash windows with wedge lintels, those in the right block also with keystones. | II |
| Jacoby's Building; 52.95159°N 1.14325°W | | Mid 19th century | A warehouse, later offices, in red brick, with stone dressings, a string course, a coped blocking course, and a slate roof. There are five storeys and eleven bays. In each end bay is a segmental-headed doorway with a moulded surround and a fanlight, and the windows are swing casements with segmental heads in yellow brick. | II |
| Former Lloyd's Bank; 52.95367°N 1.14530°W | | Mid 19th century | The bank, later used for other purposes, is partly stuccoed and partly in stone, with quoins, string courses, a modillion eaves cornice with a tile frieze, a parapet and a slate roof. There are four bays, the left two bays with three storeys. In the ground floor is a full-width shop front with round-headed lights, and above are windows with moulded architraves. The right two bays have a single storey on a granite plinth, and they contain a doorway under a cornice and a balustrade. Above and behind is a full-width traceried opening with a central round-arched window under a dentilled cornice. | II |
| The Lanes; 52.95369°N 1.14294°W | | Mid 19th century | A house and shop, altered in 1882 by R. C. Sutton, in red brick with stone dressings and a slate roof. There are four storeys and three bays. In the ground floor is a shop front with barley-sugar cast iron columns, forming entrances flanked by plate glass windows, above which is a cast iron verandah with cast iron brackets and barley-sugar columns. The top two floors contain sash windows, those in the third floor with segmental-arched heads, keystones, and a continuous shaped hood mould. | II |
| Eastgate House; 52.95163°N 1.14269°W | | 1850–60 | A warehouse, later offices, on a corner site, in red brick, the basement in rusticated stone, with sill bands, a moulded eaves cornice with brackets and panels, a coped parapet and a slate roof. There are four storeys and basement, and fronts of six and seven bays, with rounded bays on the corners. The windows are sashes with segmental heads and cornice keystones. In the centre of the Stoney Street front is a round-ached cart entrance with a rusticated surround and a lion's head keystone, containing wrought iron gates and an overthrow, and to its left is a segmental-headed doorway. | II |
| Teespoint House; 52.95181°N 1.14283°W | | 1850–60 | A warehouse, later offices, on a corner site, in red brick on a rusticated stone basement, with stone dressings, sill bands, a tile-patterned frieze, a cornice, a brick coped parapet and a slate roof. There are four storeys and a basement, fronts of eight and four bays, and a rounded bay on the corner. The doorway on Broadway has a segmental-arched doorcase with a moulded surround and a keystone, and the doorway has shafts, a fanlight, and decorative spandrels. The windows are sashes with segmental heads, and keystones. | II |
| 1 Kaye's Walk; 52.95160°N 1.14298°W | | c. 1853–60 | A warehouse, later offices, in red brick and stone, with a stone basement, sill bands, a bracketed cornice, a coped parapet and a slate roof. There are four storeys, a basement and attics, and four bays. The segmental-headed doorway has a moulded surround, and the windows are sashes with segmental heads, projecting surrounds and keystones. In the basement are segmental-headed windows with vermiculated keystones, and above the attic is a coped gable with a finial, containing a roundel with keystones. | II |
| Stanford House; 52.95081°N 1.15003°W | | c. 1854 | A warehouse, later offices, designed by T. C. Hine, in red brick on a plinth, with stone dressings, a moulded string course, a sill band, a moulded eaves cornice, and a coped parapet. There are four storeys and ten bays. In the left bay is a round arched doorway with paired Doric columns, above which are two round-headed cross-mullioned windows with shouldered surrounds. In the right bay is a doorway with a fanlight, and between them are windows, all with segmental heads and moulded surrounds. The upper floors contain segmental-headed casement windows with transoms. | II |
| 1 Broadway; 52.95201°N 1.14400°W | | c. 1855 | A block of warehouses on a corner site, later used for other purposes, designed by T. C. Hine, in red brick, the basement in rock-faced stone, on a plinth, with stone dressings, sill bands, a bracketed eaves cornice, a coped parapet, and slate hipped and mansard roofs. It is in three and four storeys, with fronts of four and eleven bays, and a curved bay on the corner. The round-arched doorway has shafts, a fanlight and an entablature, and to the right is a segmental-headed cart entrance with a keystone and a wrought iron gate. Most of the windows are sashes with moulded round heads and keystones. | II |
| 2, 4 and 6 Broadway; 52.95186°N 1.14385°W | | 1855 | A lace warehouse, later used for other purposes, designed by T. C. Hine, in red brick, partly rendered, on a plinth, with stone dressings, a first floor cornice, a string course, an eaves cornice, a coped parapet, and slate roofs. There are three storeys, a basement and attics, and ten bays, the right three bays projecting with a rounded corner. In the left bay is a round-arched porch with side lights, and steps leading to a recessed round-arched doorway, above which is an oriel window on shaped brackets. To the right are two doorways with segmental heads and moulded surrounds, one with a keystone containing a monogram. Most of the windows are sashes with segmental heads. | II |
| Adams Building and railings 52.95293°N 1.14367°W | | 1855 | Warehouses and workshops designed by T. C. Hine, and later extended to become the largest and most impressive of such buildings in Lace Market, and subsequently converted for other uses. They are in red brick with stone dressings and slate roofs, in three and five storeys with basements and attics, they have an irregular plan, and most of the windows are cast iron glazed casements. The original central block is in Italianate style, with quoins, cornices, and a coped parapet with finials. In the centre, steps with a balustrade lead to the round-arched doorway with pilasters, above it is a rounded bay window with a balustrade. In the attic is a large round window and a shaped gable with a clock. Outside is a full-length wrought iron railing on a stone plinth. | II* |
| Birkin Building; 52.95178°N 1.14335°W | | 1855 | A lace warehouse, later used for other purposes, designed by T. C. Hine in Italianate style, in red brick, the ground floor in stone, on a plinth, with stone dressings, a ground floor cornice, a string course, an eaves cornice, and a rendered coped parapet. There are four storeys and an L-shaped plan, with fronts of eight and three bays. Most of the windows have round-arched heads, mullions, and hood moulds, and some in the ground floor have moulded surrounds and aprons. The main entrance, facing east, has a canted three-storey tower porch, with double doors and bay windows above. The entrance bay facing north has a segmental-headed cart entrance, over which is a carved ribbon and three-light windows. This is flanked by two canted bays, the left with a doorway and the right with a window, each with bay windows above. | II |
| Broadway House and railings 52.95203°N 1.14297°W | | 1855–56 | A lace warehouse on a corner site, later used for other purposes, designed by T. C. Hine, in red brick, the ground floor in stone, on a plinth, with stone dressings, a ground floor cornice, rusticated quoins, an eaves cornice, and a coped parapet. There are four storeys, fronts of nine and four bays, and a rounded bay on the corner. Most of the windows are cast iron glazing bar casements, those in the ground floor with segmental heads, and elsewhere with round heads. The middle three bays on Broadway are recessed, and contain a three-storey canted bay window with a balustrade. On this front are two segmental-headed doorways, each with a moulded surround, and double shafts. The area railing is in wrought iron. | II |
| 16 Pilcher Gate; 52.95215°N 1.14485°W | | c. 1856 | A warehouse on a corner site, later used for other purposes, designed by T. C. Hine, on a plinth, the ground floor in painted stone, the upper parts in red brick, with stone dressings, ground floor and eaves cornices, a sill band, and a hipped slate roof. There are three storeys, a basement and attics, and fronts of five and six bays, with a rounded bay on the corner. In the corner is a segmental-headed doorway with a moulded surround, granite columns and a fanlight. Most of the windows are casements with cast iron glazing, those in the ground floor with segmental heads, and above with round heads and linked hood moulds. In the attic are smaller wood-framed windows. | II |
| Great Northern Warehouse; 52.94831°N 1.13575°W | | 1857 | The warehouse built for the Great Northern Railway and designed by T. C. Hine is a ruin. It is in red brick on a plinth, with dressings in stone and white brick, with an eaves band and without a roof. There are two storeys, and 16 bays with recessed round-headed recesses, and the windows are cast iron glazing bar casements. In the ground floor are two round-arched cart entrances and round-arched windows, and the upper floor contains two hoists on cast iron brackets, and circular windows. | II |
| London Road Railway Station, goods sheds and canopies 52.94793°N 1.13907°W | | 1857 | The station was designed by T. C. Hine for the Great Northern Railway. It is in red brick, with dressings in stone and yellow brick, and slate roofs with tile cresting. The main range faces north, with a secondary range facing west, the two joined by a curved corner. To the south are extensive goods sheds, and platform canopies with valanced roofs. The main range has two storeys and attics, seven bays, a plinth, quoins, a cornice, and a diaperwork parapet, and the windows are sashes. On the front is a round-arched porte-cochère with panelled pilasters, cast iron columns, and a balustrade. Above, the middle bay projects and contains a Venetian window, and a shaped gable containing a round-arched window and a clock. Behind is a truncated pyramidal roof with a cast iron crest. | II |
| 56 Bridlesmith Gate and 19 Low Pavement; 52.95162°N 1.14714°W | | 1859 | A shop on a corner site, in red brick, the ground floor in channelled stucco with a dentilled cornice, with stucco dressings, an elaborate moulded eaves cornice, a coped blocking course, and a slate roof. There are three storeys and fronts of three bays, with a recessed rounded bay on the corner. In the corner bay is a doorway with a round-arched head and a fanlight. On Bridlesmith Gate are three shop windows divided by pilasters, and on Low Pavement are two smaller windows, and a round-headed doorway with a keystone. The upper floors contain sash windows, those in the middle floor with segmental pediments on elaborate scroll brackets, and in the top floor with cornices and bracketed sills. | II |
| Journal Chambers; 52.95364°N 1.14633°W | | 1860 | A newspaper office, later used for other purposes, designed by R. C. Clarke, in red brick, with dressings in stone and polychrome brick, decorative sill bands, a bracketed cornice and a tile roof. There are three storeys and attics, and four bays. In the ground floor is a shop front dating from the late 1950s or early 1960s with crazy paved floors and sloping display windows, above which is a frieze with a plaque and roundels. The middle floor contains four paired windows with shafts, and in the top floor are eight windows with pilasters and an impost band; all the windows have pointed heads and polychrome heads. In the attic are four gabled dormers with paired, cusp-headed lights. | II |
| 10 Short HIll; 52.95115°N 1.14179°W | | c. 1860–70 | A warehouse in red brick, with stone dressings, sill bands, a modillion cornice and a coped parapet. There are three storeys and three bays. The doorway has a fanlight and a cornice on shaped brackets, and the windows are sashes with flat brick arches. | II |
| Warehouses, Trivet Square; 52.95103°N 1.14156°W | | c. 1860–70 | The warehouses on the north and west sides of the square are in red brick with stone dressings and slate roofs. There are four storeys and a basement, and an L-shaped plan with fronts of three and four bays. The front facing Short Hill has two façades, the left with moulded cornices, and a coped brick parapet. In the ground floor is an elliptical carriage arch with voussoirs, a keystone, and a pair of wrought iron gates, and to its right is a tripartite window with mullions. The upper floors each contain five sash windows with keystones, and on the first floor is a wrought iron sign and bracket. The right façade has pilasters in the upper floors and corners, corner ball finials, and a shaped gable with a pediment containing a panel. The doorway has panelled pilasters. The top floor contains casement windows, and the windows in the other floors are sashes. The west range contains a stair tower with an octagonal turret and a conical roof. | II |
| 10 and 12 Plumptre Street; 52.95171°N 1.14155°W | | 1861 | A lace warehouse, later a workshop, designed by T. C. Hine in Italianate style, in red brick, the ground floor in stone, with dressings in stone, and yellow and blue brick, a ground floor cornice, a sill band, an eaves cornice and a slate roof. There are three storeys and attics, and five bays, the middle and outer bays projecting. In the centre bay is a round-headed cart entrance with a moulded surround, roundels with the date and a monogram, and wrought iron gates. The right bay contains a round-headed doorway with a moulded surround and traceried spandrels, and in the left bay is a round-headed loading bay converted into a window. In the projecting bays, the first floor contains a Venetian window, above which is a three-light window, in the outer bays a dormer in a shaped gable, and in the middle bay a dormer with a pediment. The ground floor windows are casements and above they are sashes. | II |
| Castle Gate Congregational Centre and railings 52.95170°N 1.14935°W | | 1863 | A chapel, designed by R. C. Sutton, in red brick on a plinth, with dressings in blue and yellow brick and stone, lintel and impost bands, a bracketed eaves cornice, a pierced balustrade with corner pedestals, and slate roofs. There are two storeys and fronts of three and five bays. The middle bays of the entrance front project under a pedimented gable containing a datestone, with bracketed cornices and an arched corbel table, and flanked by pilaster buttresses. In the centre is a round-arched double doorway divided by a granite shaft, above it is a glazed tympanum with a keystone, and flanked by round-arched windows. Above, and in the outer bays, are round- and segmental-arched windows. In front of the building is a cast iron railing on a brick plinth with chamfered coping, and square brick gate piers with stone pyramidal caps. | II |
| St Saviour's Church; 52.94203°N 1.14223°W | | 1863–64 | The church was designed by R. C. Sutton in Gothic Revival style, and the spire was rebuilt in 1955. The church is built in stone with slate roofs, and consists of a nave with a clerestory, north and south aisles, a chancel, a vestry and a southwest steeple. The steeple has a tower with three stages, buttresses, quoins, and a west doorway in a recess with a pointed arch containing a pair of doors with a central shaft, above which is a traceried round window. In the top stage are paired bell openings, and the tower is surmounted by a broach spire with lucarnes. | II |
| Churchyard wall, St Saviour's Church; 52.94211°N 1.14234°W | — | 1863–64 | The wall which encloses the west and north sides of the churchyard was designed by R. C. Sutton. It is in stone with chamfered coping, and contains two pairs of gate piers. | II |
| Meadow Mill; 52.94624°N 1.14408°W | | c. 1865 | A cotton spinning mill, later a lace factory, subsequently used for other purposes. It is in re brick on a plinth, with stone dressings, a moulded cornice, a parapet and a clerestory roof. There are five storeys and attics, a U-shaped plan, fronts of 30 and twelve bays, and four-bay rear wings. The windows are metal-framed casements, those in the outer bays on the front with round-arched heads. At the rear are four stair turrets, those in the angles are canted. | II |
| 5 Byard Lane; 52.95209°N 1.14662°W | | 1865–66 | An office building, later a shop, designed by Thomas Simpson in Gothic Revival style. It is in red brick, the ground floor rendered, on a plinth, with dressings in stone and yellow brick, cornices, string courses, chamfered eaves and a slate roof. There are two storeys and attics, and five bays. In the ground floor is an arcade of six pointed arches with chamfered and moulded surrounds, cast iron shafts, foliage capitals, and hood moulds. Most of the windows are sashes with pointed arches and polychrome heads, the attic windows with flat heads. | II |
| Imperial Building; 52.95328°N 1.14568°W | | 1868 | A post and telegraph office on a corner site, later used for other purposes, it is in stone on a plinth, with cornices, rusticated angle pilasters, ground floor pilasters, and a parapet There are three storeys and a basement, fronts of nine and seven bays, and a rounded bay on the corner. In the corner bay is a doorway with a fanlight, above which is a balustrade, a window with a pediment, and a window with a cornice on brackets. The windows are sashes, those in the middle floor with sham balustrades. | II |
| Trent Bridge; 52.93848°N 1.13632°W | | 1868–71 | The bridge was designed by Marriott Ogle Tarbotton, and carries London Road (A60 road) over the River Trent. It consists of three segmental cast iron arches, each span with pierced spandrels, a dentilled sill, and a pierced iron balustrade In the centre of each span is a lamp standard. The piers are in Aberdeen granite, with pointed cutwaters. At each end is a pair of pylons with coats of arms and moulded square caps. At the southeast end are three round flood arches with moulded soffits.The approach walls are curved and have moulded string courses and copings. | II |
| Boundary marker 52.94784°N 1.15187°W | | 1869 | The parish boundary marker is on the towpath of the Nottingham Canal to the south of Castle Lock. It is in cast iron, with a half-round section, it is about 1 metre (3 ft 3 in) high, and is inscribed with the date and the names of three overseers of the poor. | II |
| Former Reform Club; 52.95320°N 1.14634°W | | 1869–70 | An office building designed by Robert Evans, and converted into a club in 1912–13 by W. B. Starr and Hall. It is in stone on a plinth, with cornices, a Portland stone balustrade, and a slate mansard roof. There are three storeys and attics and five bays. The middle bay projects slightly, and contains a round-arched doorway with shafts and sidelights, above which is a balcony on brackets with a balustrade. The bay is surmounted by a pavilion with a cornice, a balustrade, and a truncated pyramidal roof with iron cresting. The windows in the middle floor have round-arched heads with hood moulds, and those in the ground and top floors have flat heads. | II |
| 4 Bridlesmith Gate and 13 Poultry; 52.95311°N 1.14742°W | | c. 1870 | Shops and offices on a corner site, in red brick, with stone dressings, quoins, sill bands, string courses, an eaves cornice on brackets, a blocking course, and a hipped slate roof. There are four storeys and fronts of five and two bays. In the ground floor are shop fronts, granite pilasters and a fascia board. The windows are sashes, in the first floor they have moulded surrounds and pediments, and the windows in the top two floors have segmental-arched heads, keystones, an impost band and hood moulds. | II |
| 3 and 5 Market Street; 52.95388°N 1.15146°W | | c. 1870 | A pair of shops and offices in red brick, with painted stone dressings, and a slate mansard roof with coped gables. There are four storeys and attics, and five bays. In the ground floor are two late 20th-century shop fronts, and in the upper floors are sash windows. The windows in the first floor have round heads, rusticated surrounds, hood moulds and keystones, and in the floor above they have segmental heads, shafts, keystones and cast iron balconies. In the top floor the windows have rounded corners, on a sill bands, and the attic contains dormers with shallow gables and round-headed windows. | II |
| 9 Market Street; 52.95412°N 1.15147°W | | c. 1870 | A shop and offices in Italianate style, in red brick with stucco dressings, quoins with bevelled rustication, sill bands, and a deep modillion cornice. There are four storeys and two bays. In the ground floor is a late 20th-century shop front, and the first floor contains a bowed shop window with pilasters and a cornice. The top floors contain sash windows with moulded surrounds, those in the third floor with decorated pedimented lintels. | II |
| 13 Market Street; 52.95429°N 1.15144°W | | c. 1870 | A shop and offices in Venetian Gothic style, in red brick, with painted stone dressings, and a slate roof with a coped gable. There are four storeys and a single bay. In the ground floor is a later 20th-century shop front and an entry, above is a two-storey canted bay window and a balustrade, with round-arched lights in the first floor and shouldered lights above. In the top floor is a round-arched, two-light window. | II |
| 22 and 24 Market Street; 52.95451°N 1.15114°W | | c. 1870 | A shop and offices in Italianate style, in red brick with stucco dressings, a bracketed eaves cornice and a slate roof. There are three storeys and attics, and three bays. In the ground floor are shop fronts with a fascia cornice on brackets. The first floor contains a round-headed window with a segmental pediment on brackets, flanked by canted bay windows, also with segmental pediments. In the top floor is a round-headed window with a keystone flanked by paired windows, all with moulded surrounds and a bracketed sill band, and in the attic are flat-headed windows. | II |
| Former George Hallam and Sons Offices; 52.95283°N 1.14825°W | | c. 1870 | Part of a hotel, later used for other purposes, it is in stone, with a moulded sill band, a moulded eaves cornice, and a plain parapet. There are two storeys and three bays, the bays divided by Doric pilasters, rusticated on the ground floor. In the left bay is a doorway with a moulded surround and a festoon lintel, and to the right are two openings with eared architraves and double keystones. The upper floor contains sash windows with round-headed fluted tympana, keystones and an impost band. | II |
| Former Imperial Public House; 52.95292°N 1.15246°W | | c. 1870 | A commercial building in Italianate style, later a public house, it is in red brick, the ground floor in stone, with stone dressings and a balustrade. There are three storeys and five bays. The ground floor bays are divided by pilasters under a fascia cornice. The upper floors contain sash windows, those in the middle floor with alternating segmental and triangular pediments, and in the top floor with moulded surrounds. | II |
| Pit and Pendulum; 52.95344°N 1.14602°W | | 1870 | A shop and offices designed by Robert Evans, extended in 1873 by Evans and Jolley, and later converted into a public house. It is in red brick with stone dressings, quoins, a rusticated strip, a modillion cornice, a mosaic frieze, and a balustrade with pedestals. There are four storeys and five bays. In the ground floor are five openings divided by stone pilasters, each with a panel of coloured tile, above which is a cornice, and over each pilaster is a relief panel with a segmental pediment. In the upper floors are sash windows with segmental heads and keystones. On the first floor is a bracket clock with automaton figures. | II |
| Statue of Sir Robert Juckes Clifton; 52.93813°N 1.15392°W | | c. 1870 | The statue of Sir Robert Juckes Clifton is in sandstone. It depicts a life-size standing figure in contemporary dress, standing on a square pedestal with a cornice and a stepped square base. | II |
| Wilford Bridge Toll House; 52.93836°N 1.15414°W | | 1870 | The former toll house is in red brick on a plinth, with stone dressings, a corbel table with fleurons, and a hipped slate roof. There are two storeys, an elongated octagonal plan, and a single bay. The windows are casements with pointed arches, and moulded surrounds with shafts. On the front is an opening with a pointed arch divided by a pilaster, to the left is a ticket window, to the right is a doorway, and in the tympanum is a dated toll board. | II |
| 16 Stoney Street; 52.95272°N 1.14349°W | | 1872 | A warehouse on a corner site, later used for other purposes, designed by Evans and Jolley, on a plinth, the ground floor is in stone and the upper parts in red brick, with dressings in brick and stone, ground floor and eaves cornices, dentilled string courses, and slate roofs. There are four storeys, a basement and attics, and fronts of 16 and three bays. The middle bay on Stoney Street is canted, and contains a round-headed doorway with a fanlight and decorated spandrels, and at the top is a coped gable containing a Venetian window. Most of the windows are sashes, those in the ground floor with round-arched heads, and in the first and second floors with segmental heads. | II |
| 12 Victoria Street and balustrade 52.95317°N 1.14644°W | | 1872 | An office building, designed by Evans and Jolley, and later used for other purposes, in stone with pink granite dressings, a modillion cornice, a balustrade and a slate mansard roof. There are three storeys and attics, and five bays. In each outer bay is a doorway with Corinthian columns on pedestals and a pediment, and between them are round-arched windows with margin glazing, divided by Corinthian pilasters. The upper floors contain sash windows, those in the middle floor with a balcony and a pediment, and in the attic are three pedimented dormers. In front of the house is a granite balustrade with pedestals. | II |
| 53 Stoney Street; 52.95139°N 1.14198°W | | 1873 | A warehouse and offices, with an extension of 1904, and a chimney. The main block is in red brick on a chamfered plinth, with stone dressings, quoins, sill bands, a moulded eaves cornice and slate roofs. There are five storeys and basement, with fronts of five and 14 bays. The main doorway has granite pilasters, a fanlight and a cornice. At the rear is an octagonal coped factory chimney. The extension has five storeys, basements and attics, and three bays. In the ground floor and basement are round-arched openings with rusticated pilasters and keystones, and to the right is a cart entrance. | II |
| 1 and 3 Bridlesmith Gate; 52.95297°N 1.14714°W | | 1873–75 | A shop and offices on a corner site, designed by Lawrence Bright, with a shop in similar style added to the right in 1927. It is in red brick with stone dressings, pilasters between the bays, moulded floor bands, a heavy modillion cornice, and a hipped slate roof. There are three storeys and attics, and fronts of two and three bays, with a rounded entrance bay on the corner. In the ground floor are shop fronts with panelled pilasters, and in the corner is a round-arched doorway with a moulded surround and granite shafts. The upper floors contain cross casement windows, and the attic windows have shaped hood moulds. | II |
| Former Standard Chartered Bank; 52.95266°N 1.14824°W | | 1874 | Offices on a corner site, then a bank, subsequently used for other purposes, the building is in stone, with sill and impost bands, an intermediate cornice, a modillion eaves cornice, and a panelled parapet. There are two storeys and a basement, and fronts of four and five bays. The doorway has panelled pilasters and a fanlight, and the basement openings have segmental heads. The windows are cross-casements, those in the ground floor with flat heads, and those in the upper floor with round-arched heads, carved tympana and balustrade panels. The window above the doorway has a colonnette, and a balustraded balcony on curved brackets. | II |
| Former Dog and Bear Public House; 52.95299°N 1.14740°W | | 1874–76 | A public house converted into shops in 1993, designed by John Collyer in Italianate style. The building is in stone on a plinth, with a rusticated ground floor, quoins, floor bands, and an eaves cornice. There are three storeys and three bays. In the ground floor is an arcade of five round arches with a foliage impost band and hood moulds, containing doorways and windows with fanlights. The middle floor contains round-arched windows with stone balconies and cast iron crests, and in the top floor are windows with shaped heads and hood moulds. | II |
| Former Unitarian Chapel; 52.95095°N 1.14529°W | | 1874–76 | The church, later used for other purposes, was designed by Stuart Colman in Gothic Revival style. It is built in stone with slate roofs, and consists of a nave with a clerestory, aisles, transepts, a chancel, a vestry and a steeple. The steeple has a tower with three stages, buttresses rising to spire pinnacles, and a decorative doorway, above which is a traceried blind arcade. In the middle stage are a round window on one side, lancet windows on the other sides. Above are two-light bell openings, an octagonal turret and an octagonal spire. | II |
| 9 Weekday Cross; 52.95154°N 1.14581°W | | 1875 | A warehouse designed by William Heazell in Italianate style, later used for other purposes, in red brick with a rusticated stone basement, stone dressings, quoins, sill bands, an eaves cornice, and a pierced coped parapet. There are four storeys and five bays. In the centre is a segmental-headed doorway with a fanlight, flanked by windows and doorways, all with segmental heads. In the middle bay is a two-storey canted oriel window on stone brackets, and above it is a tripartite sash window under a pediment. The other windows are sashes with stone surrounds. | II |
| 17 Market Street; 52.95442°N 1.15150°W | | c. 1875 | A shop and offices in red brick, with stone dressings and a slate mansard roof. There are four storeys and attics, and three bays. In the ground floor is a late 20th-century shop front, above which is a two-storey oriel window, each window with an impost band, between them is a latticework string course, and above is a cast iron balcony railing. The other windows are sashes, in the top floor forming an arcade of four windows with pointed heads, and in the attic is a gabled dormer with pilasters. | II |
| 30 Market Street; 52.95471°N 1.15114°W | | 1875 | A shop and offices, later a restaurant, in red brick, with dressings in painted stone, blue brick and terracotta. There are three storeys and attics, and three bays. In the ground floor is a late 20th-century shop front, and the bays in the upper floors are divided by pilasters. In the middle floor are three plate glass windows divided by cast iron columns, in the top floor are sash windows with similar columns, and all the windows have ornamental lintels. At the top is an elaborate machicolated cornice and a parapet, over which is a central coped gable with a datestone and three shouldered windows. | II |
| Former County Court Building; 52.95276°N 1.14787°W | | c. 1875 | An inset attic storey was added to the county court building in 1883–84, and it has since been used for other purposes. The building is in stone and brick on a vermiculated plinth, with channelled rustication, a first floor cornice and impost band, a modillion eaves cornice, a balustrade, and a slate mansard roof. There are two storeys, a basement and attics, and fronts of five and eleven bays, and most of the windows are casements. The ground floor windows on Bank Place have voussoirs, in the upper floor they have cornices and balustrades and are divided by ionic pilasters, and above are lunettes, and in the attic storey the windows have pediments and blank lunettes. The St Peter's Gate front has French windows, and in the roof is a pedimented dormer. | II |
| Railway Goods Offices, platforms, gate piers and railings 52.94756°N 1.14765°W | | 1875 | The former goods office is in red brick and stone, the ground floor rusticated, with polychrome bands above, stone dressings, a string course, a dentilled eaves cornice, a coped parapet, and a hipped slate roof. There are two storeys and a basement, and fronts of five and two bays. In the centre is a projecting porch with a segmental-arched opening, flanked by segmental-arched cross mullioned windows with keystones. Above are single and double round-arched sash windows with impost bands and hood moulds. In front of the building is a cast iron railing on a stone plinth, with square piers. To the right is a curved wall with stone coping, ending in a pair of square piers with stepped caps and lamps. Behind the building are covered platforms with hipped steel and cast iron roof structures. | II |
| 4 Lincoln Street; 52.95442°N 1.14718°W | | Late 19th century | A shop in red brick with stone dressings, rusticated quoins, sill bands, ornate bracketed eaves, and a hipped slate roof. There are three storeys and three bays. The central doorway is recessed with canted side windows, corner columns and plate glass shop windows, over which is a moulded cornice. The windows are sashes with moulded surrounds, in the middle floor they have round-arched heads, pilasters and keystones, and in the top floor they have flat heads. | II |
| 22 Long Row and 2, 4 and 6 King Street; 52.95390°N 1.14928°W | | Late 19th century | A block of shops and offices on a corner site, in red brick, with stone dressings, quoins, string courses, and Westmorland slate roofs. There are four storeys and fronts of one and eight bays. The ground floor contains shop fronts, and at the corner are columns. Above, most of the windows are casements with mullions and transoms, those in the first and second floors with friezes or balconies. At each end of the King Street front is a square tower, the left with a pyramidal roof, and the right with a concave-sided round turret with a dome and a finial. Elsewhere, there are bay windows, balustrades, and dormers, one round-arched and the others with tent roofs. | II |
| 21 to 27 Stoney Street; 52.95279°N 1.14303°W | | Late 19th century | A block of lace warehouses, later used for other purposes, the ground floor in stone, the upper parts in red brick, on a plinth, with stone dressings, a sill band and cornices, and a coped parapet. There are four storeys, basements and attics and 15 bays, the middle three bays projecting. In the middle of the ground floor is an elliptical coved entrance with voussoirs, above which is a double sash window with an architrave, a column, pilasters and an entablature, above which is a similar window with a cornice and keystone. The other windows are sashes with flat brick arches, and in the outer bays of the ground floor are round-arched windows with rusticated surrounds and voussoirs. | II |
| Two wharf cranes 52.94810°N 1.14832°W | | Late 19th century | The cranes are on the wharf by the Nottingham Canal, and both are hand-operated. The left crane is in steel and cast iron and has a swivelling upright column with a curved jib attached to its foot and secured by stays. The column has a windlass near the bottom and a large cast iron pulley at the top. The right crane has a cast iron swivel base with geared windlass and a tapered square wooden jib secured by iron stays. | II |
| 10 Low Pavement; 52.95149°N 1.14804°W | | 1876 | An office, later a restaurant, designed by Alfred Smith, in stucco and stone, with a coped parapet and finials. There are four storeys and two bays. In the ground floor is a three-bay arcade with fleurons, and granite shafts with foliage corbels. The left bay is a porch containing a recessed doorway with a fanlight, and the other bays contain windows. Above is a canted oriel window with a gable containing a roundel, and sash windows with granite shafts. The top two floors each contains two sash windows, in the second floor with pointed heads, and in the top floor with segmental heads, and all with decorative impost bands. | II |
| Eastcroft Cottages; 52.94650°N 1.13723°W | — | 1876 | A pair of workers' cottages in red brick on a plinth, with stone dressings, moulded brick eaves, and slate roofs with coped gables. There are two storeys and four bays. The middle bays are gabled and the outer bays have pyramidal roofs. In the middle bays are canted bay windows with Venetian windows above, and in each outer bay is a doorway with a fanlight and a hood mould, over which is a round-arched window with a trefoil head. | II |
| Railings and gates, Eastcroft Cottages; 52.94650°N 1.13733°W | — | 1876 | Enclosing the gardens is a cast iron spearhead railing with a central gate. At each end is a square pier in Bulwell stone. | II |
| Express Chambers; 52.95505°N 1.14888°W | | 1876 | A block of offices and shops on a corner site, designed by Watson Fothergill, in stone, on a plinth, with dressings in polychrome stone and red brick, string courses, a pentice roof below the attics, and tile roofs. There are two storeys and attics, and six bays. At the left corner is a round entrance tower, with four stages, a slated conical spire and hipped lucarnes. It contains a circular porch with two round-arched entrances and round piers with crocketed capitals, and wrought iron gates and screens. Above are busts of politicians, a pierced balustrade on brackets, windows and a blind arcade. On the front, the left bay contains a canted oriel window, and in the ground floor are segmental-headed shop windows and a round-headed doorway under a gable. The middle floor windows have round heads, those in the top floor have flat heads, and in the attic are round-headed windows, coped gables, and hipped dormers. | II |
| Yate's Wine Lodge; 52.95385°N 1.15158°W | | 1876 | A stuccoed public house with a part-glazed slate roof. Across the front is a balcony on four cast iron columns, enclosed by a glazed canopy. On the balcony are five French windows divided by Ionic pilasters, over which is an entablature. Above is a shaped gable containing a round-arched window with an inscription round the head, flanked by a balustrade with four busts on pedestals. On the ground floor are four doors divided by rusticated Doric pilasters, and to the right is a doorway with Doric columns. | II |
| 19 Market Street; 52.95448°N 1.15149°W | | 1877 | A shop and offices in red brick, with stone dressings, patterned string courses, machicolated eaves, and a slate roof. There are four storeys and attics, and a single bay. In the ground floor is a late 20th-century shop front, above which is a two-storey caned bay window with a balustrade. In the top floor is a shouldered projection containing two windows, and above is a shouldered gable with a small roundel, a datestone and a finial. | II |
| 14, 14A and 16 St James' Street; 52.95313°N 1.15237°W | | 1877 | Originally the Old Malt Cross Music Hall, later shops and a café, in roughcast brick, with stucco dressings, a moulded string course and eaves, and a roof of slate and a glazed barrel vault. There are two storeys and attics, a basement and cellar, and four bays. In the ground floor is a wooden shop front with a moulded cornice, and cast iron columns with foliage capitals. The windows are mullioned and transomed, with round-arched lights. On the upper floor are four square oriel windows with tripartite sashes and a cornice, and in the attic are round-arched dormers with finials. Internally, there is a gallery on three sides with a cast iron balustrade. | II |
| National Westminster Bank; 52.95308°N 1.14939°W | | 1878 | The bank, on a corner site, is in yellow brick, the front in stone with the ground floor rusticated, on a plinth of pink granite, with dressings in stone, a dentilled cornice, a minor cornice, and a modillion eaves cornice with a Greek key frieze. On the front are three storeys and seven bays, the outer bays projecting, and on the left return are two storeys and eight bays. In the ground floor the windows have fixed lights, on the right is a portico with paired Doric columns, and on the left is a doorway with a cornice on scroll brackets. The windows are sashes with moulded architraves, those in the middle floor with cornices. | II |
| Eastcroft Depot Workshops; 52.94629°N 1.13798°W | | 1878–79 | A warehouse and offices designed by S. Dutton Walker, later a workshop, in red brick on a plinth, with dressings in stone and terracotta, a sill band, string courses, clogged eaves, and slate roofs with coped gables. There are two storeys and fronts of six and four bays. The central office block contains sash windows, and above is a gabled dormer with six slit windows and an inscription. This block is flanked by cart entrances with pointed arches, over which is a gable with three blank lancet windows. Beyond these are more sash windows, and on the right is another cart entrance. At the rear are four gabled ranges with clerestory roofs. | II |
| 34 Market Street; 52.95483°N 1.15111°W | | 1879 | A shop in red brick, with dressings in blue brick and stone, a machicolated cornice and a parapet. There are three storeys and three bays. In the ground floor is a late 20th-century stone-clad shop front, and the middle floor contains three segmental-headed windows with transoms and polychrome heads. In the top floor are four sash windows, the middle two with pointed-arched tympana and a roundel with the datestone, in a moulded coped gable. | II |
| 35 Warser Gate; 52.95343°N 1.14384°W | | 1879 | A warehouse with a steel frame and concrete floors, it is on a plinth, the basement is in stone, the upper floors are in red brick, with dressings in brick and stone, a basement cornice, and a slate clerestory roof. There are four storeys, basements and attics, and fronts of eight and two bays, with a two-storey entrance bay in the angle between. The windows are casements with transoms, the bays are round-headed and divided by pilasters, and between the floors are panelled lintels. The entrance bay contains a round-arched doorway with a rusticated surround, paired pilasters, a scroll keystone and an entablature. Above is a tripartite sash window with coved mullions and pilasters, over which is a cornice with a break and a fanlight, and a broken segmental pediment with a finial and volutes. | II |
| High Pavement Unitarian Chapel; 52.95182°N 1.14190°W | | 1879 | A warehouse, later a chapel, in red brick on a plinth, with dressings in stone and terracotta, a sill band, string courses, elaborate terracotta eaves, and a slate roof. There are three storeys and attics, and six bays. In the ground floor are five windows and a doorway to the right, all with segmental heads and keystones. The windows are iron-framed casements, those in the upper two floors with segmental heads, keystones, and decorative aprons, and in the attic they have flat heads. | II |
| Heathcoat Buildings; 52.95387°N 1.14323°W | | 1879–81 | A block of offices and shops on a corner site, designed by S. Dutton Walker and John Howitt, in red brick, with dressings in blue brick and stone, string courses, a machicolated eaves cornice, pilasters between the bays, and a slate roof. There are three storeys and attics, five bays in the curved corner, and fronts of three and five bays on the sides. In the ground floor are continuous shop floors, with panelled stone pilasters and a fascia cornice. Most of the windows are sashes, those in the second floor with polychrome segmental heads, and in the attics are hipped dormers. | II |
| 11 Pelham Street and 3 Thurland Street; 52.95397°N 1.14670°W | | 1879–82 | Originally the Nottingham and Nottinghamshire Bank, designed by Watson Fothergill, extended in 1924–26, and later used for other purposes, it is in polychrome Darley Dale millstone grit and red Mansfield stone on a chamfered plinth of polished red and grey polished Scottish granite, with brick at the rear, and slate roofs. It has string courses, and a trefoil-pierced balustrade on foliated brackets. There are two storeys, basements and attics, and a rectangular plan. Most of the ground floor windows have segmental heads, those in the upper floor have pointed arched heads and linked hood moulds, and all have granite shafts with foliate capitals. The main entrance is round-headed, with shafts, and a tympanum containing detailed carving. Above it is a decorated oriel window with a dentilled cornice, a pierced parapet with gargoyles, and a hipped roof. Over this is a square tower with corner turrets, gargoyles, crocketed spires with finials, and a bell turret with a pyramidal roof, lucarnes and a finial. | II |
| 7 Byard Lane; 52.95212°N 1.14644°W | | c. 1880 | A clothing factory, later used for other purposes, in red brick, with stone dressings, a ground floor cornice, bands, a string course and a slate roof. There are three storeys and four bays. On the left is a round-arched entry with heavily rusticated Ionic columns on pedestals, with wrought iron gates and doorway with a fanlight. To the right are windows and a doorway divided by pilasters, and in the middle floor are sash windows with fanlights, keystones and polychrome arches, divided by pilasters. The top floor contains paired sash windows with mullions. | II |
| 7 Market Street; 52.95406°N 1.15144°W | | c. 1880 | A shop and offices in red brick, with painted stucco dressings, a sill band, a moulded cornice on brackets, and a slate roof. There are four storeys and two bays. In the ground floor is a late 20th-century shop front, and the first floor contains a canted oriel window with an arched cornice. In the top two floors are sash windows with cornices, those in the top floor with segmental heads. | II |
| 15 Market Street; 52.95436°N 1.15144°W | | c. 1880 | A shop and offices in red brick, with dressings in stone and yellow terracotta, a patterned string course, moulded eaves, and a slate roof with a coped gable. There are three storeys and attics, and two bays. In the ground floor is a late 20th-century shop front. The windows are sashes, in the first floor under pointed relieving arches, and in the top floor with bracketed sills. In the attic are two windows with pointed arches and a roundel above. | II |
| 32 Market Street; 52.95478°N 1.15114°W | | c. 1880 | A shop and offices in red brick, with dressings in stone, blue brick and terracotta. There are three storeys and four bays. In the ground floor is a late 20th-century shop front clad in stone. The middle floor contains four windows with pointed-arched tympana and hood moulds, in the top floor are paired windows on a sill band, and above are two decorative moulded gables with roundels. At the rear is a shop front with cast iron columns. | II |
| 36 Market Street; 52.95490°N 1.15103°W | | c. 1880 | A restaurant on a corner site in red brick, the ground floor in pink granite, with stone dressings, and a slate roof with coped shaped gables and finials. There are five storeys and six bays. In the ground floor are entrances and windows divided by pilasters. The upper floors contain cross windows. In the first floor three windows have Tudor arched heads, keystones and three lights, and the others have flat heads and two or three lights. | II |
| 35 and 37 St Mary's Gate; 52.95173°N 1.14398°W | | c. 1880 | A warehouse in Italianate style, in red brick with terracotta dressings, a ground floor cornice, sill bands, and a modillion eaves cornice. There are three storeys and a basement, and six bays. The windows are sashes. The ground floor is divided by pilasters, and has an entry, a doorway, and five windows with basement openings below. The windows in the upper floors have moulded architraves, those in the middle floor with pediments, and those in the top floor with keystones. | II |
| Nottingham City Contract Works; 52.94633°N 1.13933°W | — | c. 1880 | The building is in red brick with stone dressings and a slate roof. There are two storeys and attics, and eleven bays. The porch has two stone shouldered arches and a pierced parapet, above which is a sash window, a lancet window, and a square tower, The tower is octagonal, with blind panels, and corbels carrying an octagonal tile-hung stage with four clock faces, above which is a short octagonal spire with dormers. To the right of the porch are sash windows and doorways, to the left is a gabled wing, and beyond that is a recessed wing with a two-storey bay window and a square bay window. | II |
| Carlton Buildings; 52.95393°N 1.14371°W | | 1881 | A block of shops and warehouses on a corner site, designed by S. Dutton Walker and John Howitt, in red brick on a plinth, with dressings in stone and terracotta, a ground floor cornice, a floor band, a corbel table, moulded eaves, and slate roofs. There are four storeys and attics, and a wedge-shaped plan, with fronts of 13 and twelve bays, two bays on the corner, and rounded bays between them. In the ground floor are continuous shop fronts divided by pilasters. Most of the windows are sashes with moulded lintels, those in the second floor with linked impost bands, and round-arched tympana containing relief panels. In the attic are dormers with coped gables. | II. |
| 48 and 50 St Mary's Gate; 52.95128°N 1.14398°W | — | 1883 | A lace warehouse, later offices, in red brick, the ground floor in rock-faced stone, on a plinth, with stone dressings, a string course, bracketed sill bands, elaborate moulded eaves, and a clerestory with a slate roof. There are three storeys, a basement and attics, and seven bays. The basement and ground floor have segmental-arched openings, and the windows above are sashes with mullions. The upper floors contain a tripartite window in the middle bay, and in the outer bays are round-headed windows with hood moulds. In the centre of the attic is a coped gable with a finial containing a tripartite window, flanked by a clerestory with continuous round-arched lights and dentilled eaves. | II |
| 49 and 51 Stoney Street; 52.95157°N 1.14231°W | | 1883 | A warehouse on a corner site, later offices, designed by R. C. Sutton in Italianate style. It is in red brick on a chamfered plinth, with painted stone dressings, quoins, a first floor cornice, an eaves cornice, and a blocking course. There are five storeys, a basement and attics, fronts of nine and five bays, and a rounded bay on the corner. In the corner is a doorway with a moulded surround, a fanlight and a segmental pediment on brackets. In the basement are segmental-headed openings, and the windows in the upper floors are sashes with segmental heads and linked hood moulds. The attic has two dentilled coped pedestals, clerestory windows, and a wavy-topped dormer. | II |
| Cleaves Hall; 52.95159°N 1.14963°W | | 1883 | A lecture hall, later used for other purposes, in red brick on a plinth, with dressings in blue brick and stone, pilasters, dentilled cornices, a bracketed eaves cornice and a slate roof. There are three storeys and six bays, three bays projecting under a decorative pediment with finials and iron crests, below which are windows with segmental heads and decorated keystones. In the left bay is a doorway with a segmental head, shafts and a keystone, and in the wider right bay is a round-headed doorway with shafts, a fanlight, decorated spandrels and a keystone. | II |
| 25, 27 and 29, Wheeler Gate; 52.95249°N 1.14968°W | | 1885–86 | A shop, designed by Robert Evans, in red brick, with stone dressings, sill bands, parapets, and coped shouldered gables. There are four storeys and five bays. In the ground floor is a shop front with a recessed doorway, splayed windows, pilasters and a full-width cornice on brackets. The windows are mainly sashes, in the middle of the first floor is a mullioned window with a pediment flanked by two-storey canted bay windows. Above two of the top floor windows are shaped panels. | II |
| Cattle Market gate and gate piers, Cattle Market Road; 52.94384°N 1.13728°W | | 1886 | At the entrance to the former cattle market are four square cast iron panelled piers with moulded capitals and bases. On each front panel is a coat of arms, and above is a cross-gabled cap with a bull's head. Between the central piers is a short wrought iron railing, and outside them are pairs of ornate wrought iron gates. Outside these, on each side, is a short railing, a smaller plain pier, and a wrought iron side gate. | II |
| Cattle Market gate and gate piers, Meadow Lane; 52.94340°N 1.13426°W | | 1886 | At the entrance to the former cattle market are three square cast iron panelled piers with moulded capitals and bases. On each front panel is a coat of arms, and above is a cross-gabled cap with a bull's head. On each side is a pair of wrought iron gates, and beyond are single wrought iron gates. | II |
| 1 and 2 St Peter's Church Walk and 2 St Peter's Gate; 52.95241°N 1.14789°W | | 1887 | An office block on a corner site, designed by Evans and Jolley, in red brick on a chamfered plinth, with stone dressings, string courses, and slate roofs with coped gables. There are three storeys and attics, fronts of five bays, and an angled corner bay. Most of the windows are sashes and there are canted oriel windows. Some bays are gabled, and the others have balustrades. | II |
| St George's Church and wall 52.94320°N 1.15322°W | | 1887–91 | The church was designed by R. C. Sutton, the chancel was added in 1897–98 by G. F. Bodley, and a chapel in about 1911. The church is built in stone with tile roofs, and consists of a nave with a clerestory, north and south aisles, north and south porches, and a chancel with side chapels and a vestry. There is a gabled double bell turret on the west gable, and a smaller gabled bell turret towards the east. Enclosing the churchyard on the south and west sides is a low wall in Bulwell stone with chamfered coping, containing a pair of square gate piers with chamfered caps and wrought iron double gates. | II |
| 1, 2 and 3 South Parade; 52.95293°N 1.15050°W | | 1888 | A block of offices and shops on an acute angled corner site, designed by Evans and Jolley, in red brick, with stone dressings, a moulded cornice, and roofs of tile and slate. There are four storeys and attics, fronts of four and five bays and a bay on the corner. In the ground floor are late 20th-century shop fronts. The first floor of the corner bay contains an oriel window, the other windows are sashes with mullions, and in the attics are gabled dormers. | II |
| King John's Chambers; 52.95263°N 1.14714°W | | 1888 | Shops, offices and a shopping arcade designed by John Howitt in Tudor Revival style, in red brick with stone dressings, and timber framing with brick nogging, and tile roofs. There are three storeys and attics and three bays. In the centre is the entrance to the shopping arcade, flanked by late 20th-century shop fronts, with panelled stone pilasters and a fascia with end brackets. The upper floors are jettied, and contain cross casement windows with mullions and transoms, those in the outer bays projecting. In the attics are dormers, the central one with a hipped roof, and the outer ones gabled with bargeboards and a finial. Inside the arcade are two storeys and a basement, two sections with seven and eight bays, and a footbridge. | II |
| Rutland Chambers; 52.95265°N 1.14740°W | | 1888 | Shops and offices on a corner site, designed by Lawrence Bright, in red brick with stone dressings, a cornice, a sham blocking course, moulded eaves, and slate roofs. There are three storeys and attics, fronts of three and four bays, and a rounded bay on the corner. In the ground floor is a doorway with a polychrome round-arched head, shafts and a fanlight, and late 20th-century shop fronts. Most of the windows are sashes with shaped lintels, those in the top floor with round-arched heads and keystones. In the corner bay is a two-storey canted bay window, and in two bays of the attic there is continuous glazing. | II |
| Milbie House; 52.95232°N 1.14460°W | | 1889 | A warehouse designed by Watson Fothergill, later offices, in red brick on a vermiculated plinth, with dressings in blue brick and stone, sill bands, a bracketed eaves cornice, and a slate roof. There are three storeys, a basement and attics, and seven bays. In the centre is a round-arched doorway with pink granite columns, a mullioned fanlight, and polychrome voussoirs. The ground floor windows have toplights, and are divided by grey granite columns. The windows in the upper floors have segmental heads, and in the attic is a central three-light mullioned window, flanked by two pairs of hipped dormers with finials. | II |
| 25 Warser Gate; 52.95333°N 1.14437°W | | 1890 | A warehouse, later offices, in red brick on a plinth, with stone dressings, a ground floor cornice, an eaves cornice and a slate roof. There are two storeys and a basement, and three bays. In the ground floor is a cart entrance, and to its right is a round-arched doorway with a fanlight, a keystone and spandrels. Further to the right are two tripartite sash windows with shaped mullions, and below are basement openings. The upper floor contains a canted oriel window with a domed lead roof, and to the right are two tripartite sash windows with dentilled heads and divided by pilasters. | II |
| 11 King Street; 52.95445°N 1.14971°W | | 1893–98 | A block of offices designed by Alfred Waterhouse on an acute-angled corner site. It is in red brick on a plinth, with a granite basement, terracotta dressings, sill bands, a ground floor cornice, an eaves cornice, a latticework balustrade, and tile roofs. There are three storeys, basements and attics, and fronts of three and five bays. Most of the windows are cross casements with elaborate terracotta surrounds. The entrance bay on the corner has a round arch, and steps up to a recessed doorway. It is flanked by pilasters, and above it is a carved figure, shields and mullioned windows. Over this are two floors with double windows and a pierced balcony. At the top is a square two-stage tower with corner turrets and spires, and an octagonal lead-covered main spire with lucarnes, bell openings and a finial. | II |
| Cavendish Buildings; 52.95279°N 1.15035°W | | 1894 | Shops and offices designed by John Howitt, in stone, the first floor rusticated, with string courses, sill bands, a cornice, and a pierced balustrade. There are four storeys and attics, and five bays divided by pilasters. In the ground floor are two late 20th-century shop fronts, the right one with stone pilasters. Above, in the middle bay, is a two-storey shallow bow window with a decorative lintel and balustrade. In the top floor is a tripartite window, above which is a pedimented gable containing a datestone. | II |
| Price House; 52.95225°N 1.14266°W | | 1894 | A warehouse, later offices, designed by John Howitt, in red brick, the ground floor in rusticated stone, on a plinth, with dressings in stone and terracotta, a ground floor cornice, a dentilled main cornice with a terracotta frieze, and a coped parapet with pedestals. There are four storeys and a basement, and nine bays, the outer bays defined by pilasters, and three bays on the right return. In each outer bay is a doorway with pilasters, a fanlight, and an entablature. The windows are paired sash windows with moulded lintels, and in the basement are flat-headed openings. | II |
| 5, 7 and 9 Bridlesmith Gate; 52.95284°N 1.14710°W | | 1895 | A block of shops and offices designed by Gilbert Smith Doughty in Jacobean Revival style. It is in red brick with stone dressings, lintel and sill bands, the upper floors with pilasters, and slate roofs with coped gables. There are five storeys and attics, and six bays. In the ground floor are shop fronts, and the first floor contains six showroom windows with two lights and segmental heads. In the upper floors are cross casement window, those in the third floor with segmental heads, and in the top floor with moulded segmental heads and keystones. On the top are two tall ornate gables flanked by paired finials, each containing a round window with a terracotta surround and keystones, and they are surmounted by pediments with finials. | II |
| 15 and 17 George Street; 52.95453°N 1.14534°W | | 1895 | An office designed by Watson Fothergill for his own use. It is in red brick on a blue brick plinth, with elaborate polychrome work, dressings in stone and blue brick, a floor band, and a tile roof with a tile crest. There are two storeys and attics, and five bays. In the ground floor is a doorway with a shouldered opening and shafts, to the right are two segmental arches with a grey granite column, and a basket-arched passage entry. Above, on the left, is a machicolated turret containing three windows with trefoil heads, above which is an octagonal spire roof with two lucarnes, crests and a finial. On the right are four windows with trefoil heads and clustered shafts, the statue of a medieval architect, and busts of contemporary architects, under which are four terracotta reliefs by Benjamin Creswick. Above are cross casement windows, a timber-framed gable on brackets, and an arched bargeboard. | II |
| 14 to 30 King Street; 52.95476°N 1.14926°W | | 1895 | A drapery store designed by Watson Fothergill, later shops and offices, in red brick, on an iron and concrete frame, with dressings in stone and terracotta, a first floor balustrade, sill and impost bands, string courses, and a tile roof. The building is in four and five storeys with attics, and has five bays divided by brick pilasters. The fourth bay is the tallest, with an oriel window in the top floor, above which are timber-framed attics and dormers with pyramidal roofs, surmounted by a square turret with a pyramidal roof and a finial. The other bays have timber-framed gables with patterned bargeboards. In the ground floor are shop fronts with granite pilasters. Most of the windows in the upper floors are mullioned cross casements, and there is a square oriel window, and two three-storey oriels. | II |
| 21 St Peter's Gate and 6 Bridlesmith Gate; 52.95283°N 1.14744°W | | 1895 | A shop and office on a corner site, designed by Heazell and Son in Italianate style. It is in red brick with stone dressings, angle pilasters, cornices, and a balustrade with pedestals. There are three storeys and attics, fronts of two bays and a polygonal corner tower. The ground floor contains a doorway in the corner, with pilasters, and shop fronts. The windows in the upper floors are sashes with stone surrounds, those in the middle two floors with segmental heads and keystones. On Bridlesmith Gate, the middle floors of the right bay contain a two-storey canted bay window. | II |
| Former canal museum 52.94830°N 1.14855°W | | 1895 | A canal warehouse, designed by W. Dymock Pratt, at one time a museum and later used for other purposes, it is in brown brick on a plinth, with dressings in blue and yellow brick and terracotta, modillion eaves, and a slate roof with modillion gables. There are four storeys, fronts of four and five bays, and two gabled ranges. The building spans an arm of the Nottingham Canal, with internal docking and a segmental arch over the canal. The windows are cast iron glazing bar casements, most with segmental heads. On the right return is a full-width steel-framed canopy over a loading platform. | II |
| Gateway and railings, Former canal museum 52.94865°N 1.14853°W | | 1895 | The entrance is flanked by a pair of chamfered cast iron gate piers on plinths, with decorative concave-sided pyramidal caps. Between them is a pair of wrought iron gates, and to the left is a small side gate. To the right is a spiked wrought iron railing on a chamfered stone plinth extending for about 35 metres (115 ft). | II |
| Fellows, Morton and Clayton Public House; 52.94863°N 1.14841°W | | 1895 | Offices, later a public house, in red brick on a plinth, with stone dressings, a ground floor cornice, rusticated corner pilasters, and slate roofs with a coped gable, kneelers and a finial. There are two storeys and a T-shaped plan, with a front range of a single bay. On the right is a doorway with pilasters, an entablature and a fanlight, and to its left is a two-light window with shaped lintels. In the upper floor is a three-light window with pointed-arched heads, keystones and a hood mould, over which is a datestone in a pointed-arched recess. | II |
| Old Vic Public House; 52.95227°N 1.14609°W | | 1895 | A warehouse, designed by A. H. Goodall, converted into a public house, it is in brick with faience tiles on the front, cornices, a patterned frieze, and hipped slate roofs. There are four storeys and a basement, six bays on the front, two bays on the left return, an angled bay on the corner, and further to the left is a recessed bay. The doorway has a round-arched head, a fanlight, a keystone, and a cornice on double brackets. The windows are glazed to resemble sashes, those in the ground floor with flat heads and keystones, and decorated panels between. In the first floor they have segmental heads, in the second floor flat heads, and the top floor windows have round-arched heads. In the recessed bay is a segmental-arched cart entrance. | II |
| 6 Victoria Street; 52.95314°N 1.14670°W | | 1895–97 | A bank designed by Evans and son, later extended, and subsequently converted into a shop. It is in stone, the basement and ground floor in pink granite, on a plinth, with sill bands, a dentilled cornice and a balustrade. There are three storeys and seven bays. In the ground floor are five large windows divided by paired Doric pilasters, and at the ends are doorways. The upper floors contain paired sash windows with mullions, those in the middle floor with pediments, and those in the top floor with cornices. | II |
| The Frontage; 52.95441°N 1.15018°W | | 1895–98 | Originally the head post office, designed by Henry Tanner, only the façade remains. It is in stone on a plinth, with cornices, a blocking course, and a slate roof with coped gables. There are 17 bays in four blocks. The main block has three storeys and attics, and a modillion cornice, and is divided by giant Ionic columns on pedestals. In the ground floor are three round arches, the middle one containing a doorway with a granite surround, a fanlight and a pediment. Above are windows and three pedimented dormers. In the side blocks are round-arched doorways with columns, and most of the windows are mullioned, some also with transoms. | II |
| 12, 14 and 16 Lower Parliament Street; 52.95507°N 1.14715°W | | 1896 | A shop and warehouse on a corner site, later a bank, designed by Watson Fothergill, in red brick, with dressings in blue brick and stone, polychrome string courses, a tiled eaves canopy below the attics, and a hipped tile roof with an octagonal turret. There are three storeys and attics, fronts of two and five bays, and an angled bay on the corner. In the ground floor are late 20th-century shop fronts, with the entrance in the corner bay, flanked by cast iron columns. Above the entrance, the bay is flanked by bartizans, and contains an oriel window, above which is a stepped gable with a round-arched three-light window. The middle floor contains Diocletian windows with terracotta sculpted panels below, in the top floor are cross-mullioned windows, and the attics have applied timber framing and hipped dormers. | II |
| 3 Stoney Street; 52.95352°N 1.14352°W | | 1896 | A warehouse designed by R. C. Sutton and later used for other purposes, it is in red brick, with stone dressings, lintel bands, an eaves cornice and a slate roof. There are four storeys and five bays. In the ground floor is a recessed late 20th-century shop front and a cart entrance to the left, and the upper floors contain sash windows. | II |
| Alexandra House; 52.95461°N 1.15112°W | | 1897 | A club designed by A. R. Calvert and later used for other purposes, it is in stone with a tile roof. There are three storeys, a basement and attics, and four bays. The ground floor is arcaded with three round-arched windows, and a round arched doorway with a fanlight on the left, and above is a cast iron balcony. The upper floor bays are divided by pilasters. In the first floor is a central bow window with columns, a cornice, and a solid balustrade with a crest, and this is flanked by recessed French windows. In the top floor are four sash windows, and the attic contains two cross-mullioned windows with round-arched tympana, above is a roundel, all in a massive gable with volutes, and finials. | II |
| Barker Gate Warehouse; 52.95259°N 1.14277°W | | 1897 | A warehouse on a corner site, designed by Watson Fothergill, and later used for other purposes, it is in red brick and stone, on a plinth, the ground floor rusticated, with dressings in blue brick and stone, a ground floor cornice, sill bands, string courses, and tile roofs. There are four storeys, a basement and attics, and fronts of ten and three bays. The corner bay is segmental and contains a doorway with shafts, above which is a two-storey oriel window with a hipped roof. In the top floor are four windows flanked by octagonal domed turrets, which rise to flank a larger central octagonal turret with a hipped roof. The windows are sashes, those in the middle two floors with segmental heads. | II |
| Queen's Chambers; 52.95387°N 1.14968°W | | 1897 | Shops and offices on a corner site, designed by Watson Fothergill, in red brick with dressings in stone and terracotta, a tile roof, and jettied timber-framed gables with bargeboards. The building is in three and four storeys and attics, and fronts of two and six bays. On the corner is an octagonal tourelle on a massive granite pier, with a spire, lucarnes and a finial, and on King street is an embattled tower. The ground floor has a colonnade with granite piers and shop fronts. In the upper floors are oriel windows with one, two or three storeys, and cross-casement windows with mullions and tracery. | II |
| Thurland Hall Public House; 52.95382°N 1.14634°W | | 1898–1900 | The public house was designed by G. S. Doughty, it is on a corner site, and is in stone with a slate roof. There are three storeys and attics, fronts of four and five bays, and a rounded bay on the corner. In the ground floor is a pub front, divided by pilasters under a lettered fascia and a moulded cornice on scroll brackets. In the upper floors are transomed casement windows with keystones, those in the middle floor with segmental heads, and those in the top floor with round-arched heads. Between the floors is a band with foliage decoration, and in the middle floor on Pelham Street is a canted bay window with a coped parapet. On the corner is a round tower with a lead roof, and on each front is an attic dormer in a shaped gable. | II |
| 29 and 31 Long Row; 52.95380°N 1.14996°W | | 1899 | A shop, desigbed by Brewill and Baily, in red brick with stone dressings, bands, cornices, a parapet, and a slate roof with two elaborately shaped coped gables with pediments. There are three storeys and attics, and six bays. In the ground floor are three granite Doric columns in front of a recessed late 20th-century shop front. The upper floors contain cross casement windows with heavily rusticated surrounds. | II |
| Cross Keys Public House; 52.95213°N 1.14623°W | | 1899 | The public house on a corner site was designed by Evans and son, it is in red brick on a plinth, the ground floor painted, with dressings in stone and terracotta, a dentilled ground floor cornice, an eaves cornice, a spindle balustrade, and a slate roof with a pedimented gable and a ball finial on the right return. There are two storeys and attics, and fronts of four and five bays, with an angled bay on the corner. In the corner bay is a round-arched doorway with a moulded surround, a fanlight and a keystone. In the ground floor are windows with fixed lights and traceried top lights, divided by pilasters with foliage capitals, and the upper floor and attic contain sash windows. | II |
| 111 Carrington Street; 52.94775°N 1.14727°W | | 1900 | A bank, later offices, designed by Watson Fothergill, in red brick on a plinth of pink and grey granite, with dressings in stone and terracotta, corner pilasters, polychrome bands, a dentilled cornice, and a coped and shouldered gable. There are three storeys and an attic, and two bays. The ground floor is in stone, and contains a doorway with a fanlight, and three windows divided by granite columns to the right. In the middle floor are two rounded bay windows with lead domes and a terracotta balustrade. The top floor contains cross-mullioned windows, and in the attic are five round-arched windows, two of which are blank. | II |
| 15 Long Row; 52.95388°N 1.14882°W | | c. 1900 | A bank, later used for other purposes, in stone and red brick, the ground floor faced in granite, with stone dressings, and a hipped roof in Westmorland slate. There are three storeys and attics, and five bays. In the ground floor is an arcade with four fluted Greek Doric columns under a fascia cornice, behind which is a shop front. The three middle bays of the upper floors are recessed under a bracketed pediment containing a Diocletian window and festoons. The other windows are sashes, the central window in the middle floor with a pediment, and the windows in the top floor with bracketed sills. | II |
| 17 and 18 Long Row; 52.95386°N 1.14898°W | | c. 1900 | A shop that was refronted in 1924, in red brick and stone, with stone dressings, a dentilled cornice, and a hipped Westmorland slate roof. There are three storeys and attics, and three bays. In the ground floor are two granite columns and a late 20th-century shop front. The first floor contains a recessed tripartite window with mullions, flanked by pilasters and a single-light window, all under a cornice. The upper floors are flanked by round turrets with conical roofs, and between them are sash windows, above which is a through-eaves dormer with pilasters, a cornice and a crest. | II |
| Express Buildings; 52.95502°N 1.14924°W | | c. 1900 | A block of offices and shops on a corner site, in red brick, with dressings in stone and granite, polychrome bands, a major cornice, pilasters between bays, and slate roofs. There are four storeys and attics, and fronts of two and four bays, with a rounded bay on the corner. The main entrance, on Upper Parliament Street, has a round-headed doorway with a rusticated granite surround and voussoirs, and above it is a four-storey canted oriel window with a lead dome. In the ground floor are shop fronts divided by rusticated granite pilasters, with bronze surrounds and a fascia. The windows are sashes with mullions and transoms, those in the first floor with segmental heads. In the attic are three segmental pediments and shaped gables containing round windows, and also with shaped pediments. | II |
| Premier House; 52.95263°N 1.15006°W | | c. 1900 | A block of offices and shops in red brick, with stone dressings, an eaves cornice, and an unpierced balustrade with urns. The block has a curved façade with a front of 17 bays, the bays divided by pilasters, a central block with five storeys, and wings with four storeys. In the centre is a doorway with a pediment, flanked by shop fronts. The upper floors contain sash windows with stone surrounds, some with cornices, some with pediments, and some with keystones. | II |
| Public Conveniences; 52.93860°N 1.13781°W | | c. 1901 | The public conveniences at the east end of Victoria Embankment consist of two single-storey rectangular blocks in red brick with stone dressings and a felt roof covering. The internal fittings include coloured bands of tiling, grey marble fittings, patterned ceilings, and mosaic and terrazzo floors, in a good state of intactness. | II |
| Former Trent Bridge Tram Depot; 52.93795°N 1.14160°W | | 1901 | The former tram depot is in red brick on a plinth of blue engineering brick, with stone dressings, quoins, a dentilled eaves cornice, and roofs of tile and slate with moulded stone coped gables. There is a rectangular plan, and at the northeast end is a triple roof span, each gable with a segmental pediment and moulded kneelers. There are nine entrances divided by panelled pilasters, each with a fluted frieze to the capitals, above which is a continuous architrave with a dentilled cornice, and segmental pediments at the ends. Along the northwest front are 38 bays, containing doorways, and tall recessed cross windows with semicircular arches in rubbed brick, and hood moulds. | II |
| Gateways and screens, Victoria Embankment (east end); 52.93825°N 1.13830°W | | c. 1901–05 | At the east entrance to the Embankment are square stone piers with plinths, cornices and shallow pyramidal caps. Between the central piers are wrought iron railings, and on each side are cast iron railings ending in smaller piers with concave tops. | II |
| Gateways and screens, Victoria Embankment (west end); 52.93842°N 1.15384°W | | c. 1901–05 | At the west entrance to the Embankment are square stone piers with plinths, cornices and shallow pyramidal caps. Between the central piers are wrought iron railings, and on each side are cast iron railings ending in smaller piers with concave tops. | II |
| 27 Long Row; 52.95381°N 1.14982°W | | 1902 | A shop and office in brick, the front in stone, with a slate roof and a shaped coped gable. There are three storeys and an attic, and a single bay. In the ground floor is a late 20th-century shop front behind two granite Doric columns. The upper floors contain a two-storey segmental oriel window with sash windows divided by pilasters. At the top is a balustraded balcony, and three windows under a cornice. | II |
| 10 Pelham Street and 2A and 2B High Street; 52.95360°N 1.14725°W | | 1902–05 | A shop on a corner site, designed by Albert Nelson Bromley, with a glazed terracotta façade, a string course, sill bands, pilasters with dolphin motifs, and slate roofs. There are three storeys and an attic, a rectangular plan with rounded corners, eight bays on Pelham Street, seven on High Street, and five on the east front. The shop front has plate glass windows, with mullions and Ionic capitals, and curvilinear Art Nouveau panels, and the main entrance is highly decorated, with carved pilasters. In the middle floor are elliptical-headed windows with mullions and keystones. The top floor contains two-light windows with entablatures, and small engaged columns with Corinthian capitals. Above these are a dentilled cornice, a balustrade with finials, and scrolled dormers in the attic. On the northwest corner is a three-stage tower with a clock, above which is a turret with round-arched openings and an ogee dome. | II* |
| 8 Low Pavement; 52.95149°N 1.14805°W | | 1903 | An office building, later a restaurant, in red brick on a stone plinth, with stone dressings, and a tile roof with a massive crowstepped gable. There is a single storey and attics, and two bays. On the left is an elliptical-headed doorway with a fanlight and a moulded brick pediment. To the right are two windows in round-arched recesses, the left with a shaped keystone, and above are two cross-casement windows in round-arched recesses. | II |
| Nottingham Railway Station; 52.94714°N 1.14686°W | | 1904 | The station was designed by A. E. Lambert for the Midland Railway. It is in red brick, terracotta and faience with tiled and glazed roofs. The main front has a plinth, a dentilled cornice, a balustrade, rusticated columns, windows with cornices or pediments in Gibbs surrounds, pedimented doorways, and carriage entrances with Art Nouveau wrought iron gates. There is a single storey and nine bays, and a central domed clock tower, with two stages, paired Tuscan columns and pedimented windows. On the front is a central round-arched doorway, windows, and four elliptical-arched carriage entrances. | II* |
| Bentinck Hotel; 52.94767°N 1.14722°W | | 1904–05 | The hotel, on a corner site, is in red brick, on a plinth of pink and grey granite, with stone dressings, ground floor pilasters, moulded string courses, and a slate mansard roof with a coped gable and finial on each front. There are three storeys, a basement and attics, fronts of three and five bays, and a canted corner bay surmounted by a domed turret. In the ground floor is a continuous shop front, with a segmental-arched doorway on the corner, windows in rusticated surrounds, and a doorway at each end. The windows in the middle floor are casements, and in the top floor they are sashes. | II |
| Former police station 52.95098°N 1.14472°W | | 1905 | The police station, later part of the National Justice Museum, is in stone on a granite plinth, the ground floor rusticated, with giant Doric pilasters on the angles, an entablature and a parapet. There are three storeys and five bays. In the centre is a round-arched granite doorcase flanked by windows, all with keystones. The upper floors contain sash windows in moulded surrounds, those in the middle floor with double keystones and pediments on brackets, and in the top floor with corniced keystones. To the left is an elliptical carriage arch with voussoirs and cast iron gates, above which is a bridge linking to the Shire Hall, containing a window with a segmental cornice and a double keystone. | II* |
| Statue of Queen Victoria; 52.93479°N 1.14146°W | | 1905 | The statue of Queen Victoria is by Albert Toft, and was moved from Market Square to the Memorial Gardens in 1953. The figure is in white marble, standing on a pink granite pedestal with a cornice and a stepped plinth, on a stone base. On the four sides are bronze plaques, three with figures in relief. | II |
| The Embankment; 52.93941°N 1.13881°W | | 1905–07 | A shop and library on a corner site, later used for other purposes, designed by A. N. Bromley in Tudor style, it is in red brick with applied timber framing, tile hanging and a tile roof. There are two storeys and attics, and an irregular plan. The upper floor of the northeast front is jettied, forming an arcade on timber posts, above which is a large gable containing two oriel windows on carved brackets, over which is a six-light window. To the right are a two-light window and two four-light casement windows. On the left corner is a hexagonal turret with a finial, and in the left return are three gables containing oriel windows. | II |
| Mills Building; 52.95198°N 1.14208°W | | 1906 | A warehouse and factory, designed by G. S. Doughty, in red brick on a plinth, with dressings in concrete and terracotta. Most of the windows are sashes with moulded segmental heads and hood moulds. The main block has four storeys and nine bays. At the entrance is a doorway in Baroque Revival style, with a round-headed arch, rusticated columns, a fanlight and a segmental broken pediment. To its left is a carriage entrance in a similar style with Art Nouveau wrought iron gates, and further to the left are two doorways, one with a segmental hood on brackets. Above the doorway is a Venetian window with voussoirs, and a loading door on the left. There is a slightly projecting block to the left, with four storeys and a basement and seven bays. At the rear are three storeys and a basement, and six bays, with a blue brick plinth, sill bands, an eaves cornice, and a wrought iron balustrade with glazed brick pedestals and ball finials. | II |
| 15 Middle Pavement; 52.95164°N 1.14646°W | | 1907 | A block of shops and offices on a plinth, the ground floor in rusticated stone, the upper parts in brick, with stone dressings, quoins, a modillion cornice, and a slate mansard roof with coped gables. There are three storeys and antics, and seven bays. The ground floor has an arcade of five arches with voussoirs, the middle arch smaller and containing an entrance with a pediment on brackets. In the upper floors are three two-storey canted oriel windows on scroll brackets, and sash windows with keystones, those in the middle floor with segmental heads. In the attic are three canted bay windows with flat heads. | II |
| 46 St Mary's Gate; 52.95137°N 1.14401°W | | 1907 | A warehouse and offices, later a public house, designed by Evans, son and J. Woollatt. It is in red brick on a plinth, with brick dressings, lintel and sill bands, brick eaves and a slate roof. There are four storeys and four bays. In the ground floor are two doorways with fanlights, and the upper floors contain sash windows with flat brick arches. | II |
| 1 Hollowstone; 52.95147°N 1.14143°W | | 1908 | A lace warehouse and showroom, later used for other purposes, designed by Sutton and Gregory, in red brick, the basement and end bays faced in faience, with stone dressings, sill bands, dentilled eaves, and a hipped slate roof. There are six storeys and a basement, and ten bays. In the left bay is a round-arched doorway with pilasters and a cornice on brackets. The windows are sashes with shaped brick flat arches and triple keystones, and on the front is a coat of arms. | II |
| 31 and 33 Warser Gate; 52.95338°N 1.14414°W | | 1909 | A warehouse, later offices, in red brick with stone dressings, brick eaves, and a slate mansard roof with coped gables. There are three storeys and a basement, and seven bays. The bays are divided by pilasters, panelled on the upper floors, and with terracotta cartouches at their heads. In the left bay is a large round-arched doorway with a rusticated surround, a fanlight, voussoirs, a decorative keystone and a hood mould. The windows are sashes with elongated keystones, and in the attic are two box dormers and two recessed dormers. | II |
| 23 Warser Gate; 52.95332°N 1.14456°W | | 1909–10 | A factory designed by John Howitt and Son, later used for other purposes, in red brick with a rusticated stone ground floor, on a plinth, with stone dressings, a ground floor cornice, bands, a modillion eaves cornice, and a slate mansard roof with coped gables. There are three storeys, a basement and attics, and six bays. In the right bay is a round-arched doorway with voussoirs, a fanlight, a keystone, and a hood on brackets. In the upper floors are sash windows with segmental heads and keystones, and the attic contains three box dormers. | II |
| 34 and 35 Long Row; 52.95379°N 1.15028°W | | 1910 | A shop in brick with a stone front, a main modillion cornice with a central segmental broken pediment, and a coped parapet with a pedestal. There are three storeys and attics, and five bays, the middle bay projecting slightly. In the ground floor is an arcade with four granite columns, a late 20th-century shop front, and a fascia. In the upper floors are rusticated quoins. The windows are cross casements, the central window in the middle floor with a concave-sided pediment, and those in the outer bays with alternating triangular and segmental pediments, and the central window in the top floor with swags. In the attic is a round window flanked by two square windows on each side. | II |
| 4 and 6 Low Pavement; 52.95148°N 1.14820°W | | c. 1910 | Offices, later a shop, designed by E.R. Sutton, in stone and red brick, the ground floor rusticated, with a dentilled cornice and a blocking course. There are three storeys and three bays. The central entrance is splayed and flanked by shop windows. In the upper floors, the bays are flanked by giant Ionic pilasters, and there is an entablature. The wider middle bay contains a two-storey recessed bow window, and in the outer bays are sash windows, with a cornice over the middle floor windows. | II |
| Enfield Chambers; 52.95146°N 1.14773°W | | 1910 | An office and shop, designed by Calvert and Gleave, in stone and red brick, the ground floor rusticated, with a ground floor cornice, a main modillion cornice, and a stone slate mansard roof. There are three storeys and attics and three bays. In the centre of the ground floor is a wide passage with Ionic columns and a segmental-headed doorway, flanked by plate glass windows. The outer bays of the middle floor contain oriel windows with rusticated surrounds and sidelights, and the other windows are sashes. | II |
| 33 Long Row; 52.95379°N 1.15013°W | | 1912 | A cinema designed by Naylor and Sale, later used for other purposes, with a steel frame, and walls of brick faced in faience. There are four storeys and attics, and four bays. In the ground floor is an arcade with three Ionic marble columns and a fascia, and a recessed later-20th century shop front. The first and second floors have pilasters and an entablature. The first floor contains two copper-clad bow windows with Ionic pilasters and a decorative frieze, and in the second floor are two Diocletian windows, with moulded arches, decorative keystones, and cherubs' heads. The top floor has two canted bay windows and a decorated frieze, and above are two banded gables with diamond openings. At the rear is a former auditorium, and in the basement are medieval rock-hewn caves and a well. | II |
| British Waterways Warehouse; 52.94800°N 1.15042°W | | c. 1919 | The canal warehouse, later converted for other uses, is in red brick, with a concrete basement, a blue brick plinth, concrete dressings, a sill band, a string course, chamfered eaves, a parapet and a flat roof. There are six storeys and a basement, and a wedge-shaped plan with a splayed front of 21 bays divided by pilasters. The windows are metal-framed glazing bar casements, those in the ground floor with segmental heads. | II |
| Elite Building; 52.95496°N 1.14989°W | | 1919–21 | The cinema on a corner site, later used for other purposes, has a steel frame with concrete floors, it is clad in brick and faced in white faience, and has slate roofs. The building is on a plinth, and has sill and lintel bands, relief friezes between the floors, a scalloped main cornice, a stepped coped parapet, and a slate roof. There are four storeys and attics and an L-shaped plan, with fronts of nine bays, and angled bays on the corners. Between the bays are full-height pilasters, with a niche on a decorative bracket at the top containing a statue, and the windows are swing casements. The triple entrance bay has a canopy, and in the ground floor are segmental arches containing shop fronts. In the centre and on the corners are pedimented dormers. | II* |
| War memorial, St George's Church; 52.94306°N 1.15343°W | | c. 1920 | The war memorial in the churchyard is in Portland stone. It consists of an octagonal Celtic cross with a crucifix, on an inscribed octagonal pedestal and plinth, on an octagonal base of two steps. | II |
| County war memorial 52.95100°N 1.14372°W | | 1921–22 | The war memorial is at the southwest corner of the churchyard of St Mary's Church, and is approached by a tapering flight of steps with two pairs of wrought iron gates at the top. The war memorial is in stone and consists of a tall cross on a traceried octagonal base, and a stepped octagonal pedestal with an inscribed tablet. Flanking the steps are splayed walls with moulded coping and square pedestals topped with square iron lanterns. Inset in the walls are square Portland stone tablets inscribed with the names of Nottinghamshire parishes and the number of dead. | II |
| Council House, Exchange Buildings, shops and bank 52.95352°N 1.14856°W | | 1926–29 | The administrative building was designed by Thomas Cecil Howitt, and the bank, designed by Albert Nelson Bromley, was added in 1927. The building has a steel frame, it is clad in Portland stone, on a granite plinth, with a dentilled main cornice, a pierced balustrade, and lead roofs. There are four storeys and a rectangular plan. The main west front has nine bays, the middle seven bays projecting and approached by steps flanked by statues of lions, leading up to an octastyle Ionic portico with a pediment containing relief sculpture. The building is surmounted by a drum with Ionic colonnades and sculptures in niches, over which is a large dome with an ornate finial. The ground floor has channelled rustication, and contains shop fronts divided by Doric pilasters. The upper floors are divided by three-quarer Ionic columns in antis, and contain casement windows with bronze frames and panels. The adjoining bank has three storeys and attics, and fronts of nine and five bays. | II* |
| Ornamental Pond, Memorial Gardens; 52.93471°N 1.14094°W | | c. 1927 | The pond is in the form of a lobed cross, with reconstituted stone edging, containing three water jets. It extends for about 50 metres (160 ft). | II |
| 36–44 Long Row and 2–20 Market Street; 52.95387°N 1.15109°W | | 1927–28 | A department store on a corner site, designed by Bromley and Watkins, incorporating earlier buildings by T. C. Hine and William Dymock Pratt, and retaining some of the external features. The main block on the corner is clad in Portland stone, and has a slate mansard roof, and five storeys and attics. Features include six square columns with Doric capitals, forming an arcade, above which is a plain frieze and a cornice. The blocks on Market Street vary in materials and in design. | II |
| Flagstaff northwest of the Council House; 52.95362°N 1.14947°W | — | c. 1929 | The flagstaff was designed by Thomas Cecil Howitt. It consists of a tapering steel pole on a fluted column with an anthemion frieze]. The pole stands on a bronze base with four volutes and decorations. | II |
| Flagstaff southwest of the Council House; 52.95328°N 1.14958°W | | c. 1929 | The flagstaff was designed by Thomas Cecil Howitt. It consists of a tapering steel pole on a fluted column with an anthemion frieze]. The pole stands on a bronze base with four volutes and decorations. | II |
| Lamp posts north of the Council House; 52.95367°N 1.14901°W | | c. 1929 | The four lamp posts on the pavement on the north side of the Council house were designed by Thomas Cecil Howitt. They are in cast iron and octagonal with finials. Eash lamp post has a crossbar supporting two pendant electric lamps with chamfered corners and opaque glass. | II |
| Lamp posts south of the Council House; 52.95326°N 1.14877°W | | c. 1929 | The four lamp posts on the pavement on the south side of the Council house were designed by Thomas Cecil Howitt. They are in cast iron and octagonal with finials. Eash lamp post has a crossbar supporting two pendant electric lamps with chamfered corners and opaque glass. | II |
| Richmond House; 52.94888°N 1.14990°W | | 1930 | A commercial building in Art Deco style, with a steel frame and painted concrete. There are four storeys and a basement, and a D-shaped plan. The principal front is curved, with twelve bays divided by giant pilasters, with palm leaf capitals. At the top is a deep frieze with a band of paterae, palm leaves, sceptres, and the name of the building, and above is a cornice. In the ground floor are shop fronts, and the windows are sliding sashes. | II |
| Telephone kiosk near the west end of Victoria Embankment; 52.93852°N 1.15372°W | | 1935 | The K6 type telephone kiosk at the west end of the Victoria Embankment was designed by Giles Gilbert Scott. Constructed in cast iron with a square plan and a dome, it has three unperforated crowns in the top panels. | II |
| Telephone kiosk outside Teespoint House; 52.95185°N 1.14296°W | | 1935 | The K6 type telephone kiosk outside Teespoint House, Broadway, was designed by Giles Gilbert Scott. Constructed in cast iron with a square plan and a dome, it has three unperforated crowns in the top panels. | II |
| Pair of telephone kiosks, Low Pavement; 52.95148°N 1.14728°W | | 1935 | The K6 type telephone kiosks outside Nos. 24 and 26 Low Pavement were designed by Giles Gilbert Scott. Constructed in cast iron with a square plan and a dome, they have three unperforated crowns in the top panels. | II |
| 22, 24 and 26 Lister Gate; 52.95100°N 1.14887°W | | 1936–37 | A departmental store in Art Deco style, with a steel-framed core, clad in reconstituted stone. There are three storeys and attics and 13 bays. Most of the windows are casements with steel frames. In the ground floor is a full-length shop front with a tile plinth and a stone-veneered fascia. Above, the five central bays are divided by chamfered pilasters, and the three flanking bays on each side have decorative pilasters, a sham balcony over the middle floor, a shaped frieze and a cornice, metal panels under the attic windows, and a stylised gable above the parapet. | II |
| Birds Bakery; 52.95316°N 1.14821°W | — | 1962 | The shop front is recessed behind a colonnade of round columns with a mosaic of blue and white squares. The doorway is flanked by curved windows, and all have chrome hardware. The porch has a grey terrazzo which also forms a plinth under the windows. On the right side is a narrow mosaic strip with grey, white and red squares. Above the shop front is the original copperplate "Birds" sign in illuminated lettering. | II |
