= Grade II* listed buildings in Nottinghamshire =

Nottinghamshire shown within England

There are over 20,000 Grade II* listed buildings in England. This page is a list of these buildings in the county of Nottinghamshire, by district.

== Ashfield ==
Name	Location	Type	Completed (Note: The date given is the date used by Historic England as significant for the initial building or that of an important part in the structure's description.)	Date designated	Grid ref. (Note: The grid reference is based on the British national grid reference system, sometimes known as OSGB36, used by the Ordnance Survey.) Geo-coordinates	Entry number (Note: The "List Entry Number" is a unique number assigned to each listed building and scheduled monument by Historic England.)	Image
Church of All Saints	Annesley	Statue	1832	12 October 1988	SK5109953620; 53°04′39″N 1°14′19″W	1275939	Church of All Saints More images
Church of St Helen	Selston	Tower	Late 14th century	13 October 1966	SK4583453308; 53°04′30″N 1°19′02″W	1275170	Church of St Helen More images
Church of St Mary Magdalene	Hucknall	Tower	1925	12 October 1988	SK5334649381; 53°02′21″N 1°12′21″W	1217611	Church of St Mary Magdalene More images
Church of St Mary Magdalene	Sutton-in-Ashfield	Tower	c. 1395	4 June 1980	SK4894058959; 53°07′32″N 1°16′12″W	1221773	Church of St Mary Magdalene More images

== Bassetlaw ==
Name	Location	Type	Completed	Date designated	Grid ref. Geo-coordinates	Entry number	Image
Barn and attached range of farm buildings at Manor Farm	Askham	Dovecote	19th century	14 November 1985	SK7399274937; 53°15′59″N 0°53′32″W	1370116	Upload Photo
Church of St Nicholas	Askham	Parish Church	12th century	1 February 1967	SK7397375000; 53°16′01″N 0°53′33″W	1045707	Church of St Nicholas More images
Ranby Hall	Babworth	House	19th century	1 February 1967	SK6547583042; 53°20′25″N 1°01′05″W	1045110	Ranby Hall More images
Church of All Saints	Beckingham	Parish Church	13th century	1 February 1967	SK7790090293; 53°24′13″N 0°49′47″W	1045129	Church of All Saints More images
St Giles Church, Carburton	Carburton	Sundial	18th century	30 November 1966	SK6111173286; 53°15′11″N 1°05′08″W	1370105	St Giles Church, Carburton More images
Clumber Bridge (that part in Worksop Rural District)	Clumber Park, Carburton	Road Bridge	c. 1770	30 November 1966	SK6219473928; 53°15′28″N 1°04′14″W	1045732	Clumber Bridge (that part in Worksop Rural District) More images
Drayton Gate	Clumber Park, Clumber and Hardwick	Gate Pier	Late 18th century	13 February 1967	SK6490974468; 53°15′48″N 1°01′42″W	1045058	Drayton Gate More images
Greek Garden Temple	Clumber Park, Clumber and Hardwick	Garden Temple	c. 1765	13 February 1967	SK6297874535; 53°15′51″N 1°03′26″W	1156511	Greek Garden Temple More images
Roman Garden Temple	Clumber Park, Clumber and Hardwick	Garden Temple	c. 1765	13 February 1967	SK6281674762; 53°15′58″N 1°03′35″W	1156484	Roman Garden Temple
The Grotto	Clumber Park, Clumber and Hardwick	Grotto	c. 1765	30 September 1977	SK6214473938; 53°15′32″N 1°04′12″W	1045034	The Grotto More images
Church of St Giles	Darlton	Parish Church	c. 1200	1 February 1967	SK7787673674; 53°15′16″N 0°50′03″W	1212465	Church of St Giles More images
Gate piers and flanking walls to Normanton Gate	Elkesley	Gate Pier	c. 1700	30 September 1977	SK6485574644; 53°15′53″N 1°01′45″W	1156026	Gate piers and flanking walls to Normanton Gate
West Bridge over River Poulter	Elkesley	Road Bridge	1789	1 February 1967	SK6485175745; 53°16′29″N 1°01′44″W	1223918	Upload Photo
Church of Holy Trinity and boundary wall	Everton	Gate	20th century	1 February 1967	SK6913691334; 53°24′51″N 0°57′41″W	1156568	Church of Holy Trinity and boundary wall More images
Church of St Peter and St Paul	Gringley on the Hill	Parish Church	13th century	1 February 1967	SK7359890666; 53°24′28″N 0°53′40″W	1370395	Church of St Peter and St Paul More images
Church of St James (ruin)	Haughton	Church	Early 12th century	28 February 1952	SK6911172986; 53°14′58″N 0°57′56″W	1267085	Church of St James (ruin) More images
North engine house, walkway and cutwaters	Misterton	Engine house	Early 19th century	23 November 1984	SK7784895131; 53°26′50″N 0°49′46″W	1156775	North engine house, walkway and cutwaters
South engine house and boundary wall	Misterton	Engine house	1828	23 November 1984	SK7783895118; 53°26′50″N 0°49′46″W	1370383	South engine house and boundary wall
Church of St Matthew	Normanton on Trent	Parish Church	13th century	1 February 1967	SK7907069009; 53°12′44″N 0°49′03″W	1233792	Church of St Matthew More images
North Leverton Windmill	North Leverton with Habblesthorpe	Tower Mill	1813	28 February 1952	SK7750782022; 53°19′46″N 0°50′16″W	1234469	North Leverton Windmill More images
Church of St Peter and St Paul	North Wheatley	Parish Church	13th century	1 February 1967	SK7621085868; 53°21′51″N 0°51′22″W	1234572	Church of St Peter and St Paul More images
The Old Hall and adjoining Old Hall Farm House	North Wheatley	Farmhouse	20th century	28 February 1952	SK7619485749; 53°21′47″N 0°51′23″W	1275959	The Old Hall and adjoining Old Hall Farm House More images
Church of St Leonard	Ragnall	Parish Church	Restored 1864-7	1 February 1967	SK8020773674; 53°15′14″N 0°47′57″W	1233804	Church of St Leonard More images
Church of St Wilfrid	Scrooby	Parish Church	Early 15th century	1 February 1967	SK6522090754; 53°24′34″N 1°01′13″W	1239733	Church of St Wilfrid More images
East stable at Shireoaks Hall	Shireoaks	Dwelling	Early 18th century	13 February 1967	SK5521780631; 53°19′11″N 1°10′21″W	1045054	Upload Photo
Shireoaks Hall	Shireoaks	Country House	c. 1600	13 February 1967	SK5524380596; 53°19′10″N 1°10′20″W	1370408	Shireoaks Hall More images
West stable and attached outbuildings at Shireoaks Hall	Shireoaks	Stable	Early 18th century	13 February 1967	SK5523280648; 53°19′12″N 1°10′20″W	1045055	West stable and attached outbuildings at Shireoaks Hall
Church of All Saints	South Leverton	Parish Church	12th century	1 February 1967	SK7833981106; 53°19′16″N 0°49′31″W	1275880	Church of All Saints More images
Church of St Peter	Stokeham	Parish Church	13th century	1 February 1967	SK7823876916; 53°17′00″N 0°49′41″W	1233882	Church of St Peter More images
Church of St Peter and St Paul	Sturton le Steeple	Parish Church	12th century	1 February 1967	SK7879983871; 53°20′45″N 0°49′04″W	1275773	Church of St Peter and St Paul More images
Arch	Serlby Park, Styrrup with Oldcotes	Arch	Early 18th century	12 April 1985	SK6337089855; 53°24′06″N 1°02′54″W	1224495	Arch
The Old Grammar School, No. 4, and attached wall, gate and steps	Tuxford	House	1952	28 February 1952	SK7371871033; 53°13′52″N 0°53′50″W	1224333	The Old Grammar School, No. 4, and attached wall, gate and steps More images
Pair of lodges flanking North Drive	Welbeck Abbey, Welbeck	Lodge	Mid-18th century	12 April 1985	SK5603474328; 53°15′47″N 1°09′41″W	1266532	Upload Photo
Pair of lodges flanking the entrance to Glass Court Drive, tunnel entrance and wall	Welbeck	Wall	19th century	12 April 1985	SK5627174353; 53°15′48″N 1°09′28″W	1224510	Upload Photo
Pair of lodges flanking the South Drive	Welbeck Abbey, Welbeck	Lodge	Mid-18th century	12 April 1985	SK5617474161; 53°15′41″N 1°09′34″W	1224870	Upload Photo
Church of St Paul	West Drayton	Parish Church	12th century	1 February 1967	SK7111474747; 53°15′54″N 0°56′07″W	1224416	Church of St Paul More images
Church of St Mary the Virgin with boundary walls and gates	West Stockwith	Gate	18th century	1 February 1967	SK7902794740; 53°26′37″N 0°48′42″W	1045087	Church of St Mary the Virgin with boundary walls and gates More images
Sloswicke's Hospital	Retford	Almshouse	1657	5 November 1976	SK7059781352; 53°19′28″N 0°56′30″W	1302341	Sloswicke's Hospital More images
Amcott House	Retford	House	Mid-18th century	14 September 1949	SK7073881112; 53°19′20″N 0°56′22″W	1178702	Amcott House More images
Castle Farm with attached farmyard wall and outbuildings	Worksop	Farmhouse	1758	13 February 1967	SK5761177065; 53°17′15″N 1°08′14″W	1045026	Upload Photo
Church of St Michael the Archangel	West Retford	Church	14th century	14 September 1949	SK7023481313; 53°19′27″N 0°56′49″W	1370357	Church of St Michael the Archangel More images
Clumber Cascade, Main Lake, Clumber Park	Clumber Park, Clumber and Hardwick	Bridge	1763	13 February 1967	SK6013976241; 53°16′47″N 1°05′58″W	1156520	Clumber Cascade, Main Lake, Clumber Park
Depository at Canal Wharf	Worksop	Canal	19th century	10 April 1975	SK5859879242; 53°18′25″N 1°07′19″W	1045059	Depository at Canal Wharf More images
Gateford Hall	Gateford	House	Mid-17th century	13 February 1967	SK5695581550; 53°19′40″N 1°08′47″W	1370401	Upload Photo
Osberton Hall	Retford	Country House	18th century	13 February 1967	SK6270279893; 53°18′44″N 1°03′37″W	1156774	Osberton Hall More images
Parish Church of All Hallows	Ordsall	Lych Gate	18th or early 19th century	14 September 1949	SK7043579719; 53°18′35″N 0°56′40″W	1045228	Parish Church of All Hallows More images
Parish Church of St Swithun	Retford	Parish Church	15th century	14 September 1949	SK7064681324; 53°19′27″N 0°56′27″W	1370346	Parish Church of St Swithun More images
The Old Ship Inn	Worksop	Timber Framed House	Late 16th century	13 February 1967	SK5841678608; 53°18′04″N 1°07′30″W	1045065	The Old Ship Inn More images
25 Grove Street	Retford	House	Late 18th century	14 September 1949	SK7065581175; 53°19′22″N 0°56′27″W	1302355	Upload Photo

== Broxtowe ==
Name	Location	Type	Completed	Date designated	Grid ref. Geo-coordinates	Entry number	Image
Bennerley Viaduct (north east end)	Awsworth	Railway Viaduct	1877	21 November 1974	SK4727743844; 52°59′23″N 1°17′50″W	1140437	Bennerley Viaduct (north east end) More images
Church of St Catherine	Cossall	Parish Church	13th century	13 October 1966	SK4839042289; 52°58′33″N 1°16′51″W	1247982	Church of St Catherine More images
Willoughby Almshouses and adjoining boundary wall	Cossall	Gate	1685	14 May 1952	SK4831942308; 52°58′33″N 1°16′55″W	1247951	Willoughby Almshouses and adjoining boundary wall More images
Beauvale House service wing and stables and garden wall	Moorgreen, Greasley	Country House	1871–73	27 June 1986	SK4855249161; 53°02′15″N 1°16′39″W	1278051	Upload Photo
Church of St Patrick	Nuthall	Parish Church	13th century	13 October 1966	SK5147544473; 52°59′42″N 1°14′04″W	1248182	Church of St Patrick More images
Gothic summerhouse at No. 9 the Yews	Nuthall	Summerhouse	1759	13 October 1966	SK5151044343; 52°59′38″N 1°14′03″W	1248177	Upload Photo
Church of St Helen	Stapleford	Tower	13th century	18 October 1949	SK4885637362; 52°55′53″N 1°16′29″W	1248029	Church of St Helen More images
Church of St Helen	Trowell	Parish Church	13th century	13 October 1966	SK4837039743; 52°57′10″N 1°16′53″W	1278008	Church of St Helen More images
The Manor House and adjoining terrace	Bramcote	House	20th century	18 October 1949	SK5095837343; 52°55′52″N 1°14′36″W	1263875	Upload Photo
35 Hallams Lane	Beeston	Coal Shed	1936–37	14 April 1987	SK5151835915; 52°55′05″N 1°14′07″W	1263872	Upload Photo

== City of Nottingham ==
Name	Location	Type	Completed	Date designated	Grid ref. Geo-coordinates	Entry number	Image
Adams Building and attached railings	Lace Market	Workshop	1995	12 July 1972	SK5762639840; 52°57′10″N 1°08′37″W	1270430	Adams Building and attached railings More images
Albert Ball Memorial Homes	Lenton	Almshouses	1922	30 November 1995	SK5531339114; 52°56′48″N 1°10′42″W	1246781	Albert Ball Memorial Homes More images
Arkwright Building, Nottingham Trent University	Nottingham	Public Library	1877–81	12 July 1972	SK5703840324; 52°57′26″N 1°09′09″W	1255017	Arkwright Building, Nottingham Trent University More images
Boots D90 West Headquarters Building	Nottingham	Courtyard	1966–68	28 August 1996	SK5497436919; 52°55′37″N 1°11′01″W	1268303	Boots D90 West Headquarters Building
Bromley House	Nottingham	Town House	1752	11 August 1952	SK5704439910; 52°57′13″N 1°09′09″W	1246247	Bromley House More images
Camellia House 100 metres south west of Wollaton Hall	Wollaton Park	Camellia House	1823	12 July 1972	SK5321339139; 52°56′49″N 1°12′34″W	1255271	Camellia House 100 metres south west of Wollaton Hall More images
Cathedral Church of St Barnabas and attached boundary wall	Nottingham	Boundary Wall	1841–44	11 August 1952	SK5672040028; 52°57′17″N 1°09′26″W	1247533	Cathedral Church of St Barnabas and attached boundary wall More images
Church of Holy Trinity	Lenton	Parish Church	1842	30 November 1995	SK5545539310; 52°56′54″N 1°10′34″W	1247151	Church of Holy Trinity More images
Church of St Andrew and boundary wall	Nottingham	Gate	1869–71	12 July 1972	SK5703441190; 52°57′54″N 1°09′08″W	1058983	Church of St Andrew and boundary wall More images
Church of St Leodegarius and attached grave enclosure	Basford	Tower	Rebuilt 1859–61	29 April 1964	SK5529742774; 52°58′46″N 1°10′40″W	1271037	Church of St Leodegarius and attached grave enclosure More images
Church of St Leonard and attached boundary wall	Wollaton	Parish Church	c. 1200	11 August 1952	SK5249239790; 52°57′11″N 1°13′13″W	1255283	Church of St Leonard and attached boundary wall More images
Church of St Martin	Bilborough	Tower	c. 1450	29 April 1964	SK5202041811; 52°58′16″N 1°13′37″W	1255110	Church of St Martin More images
Church of St Nicholas	Nottingham	Tower	1906	11 August 1952	SK5714539565; 52°57′02″N 1°09′03″W	1270639	Church of St Nicholas More images
Church of St Wilfrid	Wilford	Tower	Late 15th century	29 April 1964	SK5663337797; 52°56′05″N 1°09′32″W	1271049	Church of St Wilfrid More images
Colwick Hall	Colwick	Country House	Early 18th century	11 August 1952	SK6017639027; 52°56′43″N 1°06′21″W	1254981	Colwick Hall More images
Council House, Exchange Buildings and adjoining shops and bank	Old Market Square	Council House	1924–29	4 February 1988	SK5730939900; 52°57′12″N 1°08′54″W	1270582	Council House, Exchange Buildings and adjoining shops and bank More images
County House	Nottingham	Townhouse	15th or 16th century	10 August 1952	SK5758539633; 52°57′04″N 1°08′40″W	1270805	County House More images
Doric Temple and attached bridge 200 metres south-east of Wollaton Hall	Wollaton Park	Bridge	Early 19th century	10 August 1989	SK5337539174; 52°56′50″N 1°12′26″W	1270389	Doric Temple and attached bridge 200 metres south-east of Wollaton Hall More images
Elite Building	Nottingham	Shop	1921	12 July 1972	SK5722240058; 52°57′17″N 1°08′59″W	1254539	Elite Building More images
Enfield House and attached area wall	Nottingham	Town House	Mid-18th century	11 August 1952	SK5737039675; 52°57′05″N 1°08′51″W	1270637	Enfield House and attached area wall More images
Former Police Station adjoining Shire Hall	Lace Market, Nottingham	Gate	1905	12 July 1972	SK5756239612; 52°57′03″N 1°08′41″W	1247636	Former Police Station adjoining Shire Hall More images
Gate and railings to forecourt of Nos. 24 and 26 Low Pavement	Nottingham	Gate	c. 1733	12 July 1972	SK5739739679; 52°57′05″N 1°08′50″W	1270638	Gate and railings to forecourt of Nos. 24 and 26 Low Pavement
Habitat and Rj's Homeshop	Nottingham	Merchants House	c. 1720	11 May 1988	SK5706339951; 52°57′14″N 1°09′07″W	1254555	Habitat and Rj's Homeshop More images
Lenton Lodge (former gateway to Wollaton Park) and attached bollards	Nottingham	Gate Lodge	1823–25	11 August 1952	SK5483839187; 52°56′50″N 1°11′07″W	1270829	Lenton Lodge (former gateway to Wollaton Park) and attached bollards More images
Lenton War Memorial	Lenton	War memorial	1823–25	30 November 1995	SK5529039094; 52°56′47″N 1°10′43″W	1246782	Lenton War Memorial More images
Midland Railway Station	Nottingham	Footbridge	1904	12 July 1972	SK5744539204; 52°56′50″N 1°08′48″W	1271301	Midland Railway Station More images
Newdigate House and attached railings and boundary wall	Nottingham	House	c. 1675	11 August 1952	SK5705939600; 52°57′03″N 1°09′08″W	1271185	Newdigate House and attached railings and boundary wall More images
Newton Building at Nottingham Trent University	Nottingham	Polytechnic	1956–58	24 April 1998	SK5706340228; 52°57′23″N 1°09′07″W	1323704	Newton Building at Nottingham Trent University More images
Nottingham Playhouse	Nottingham	Theatre	1961–63	14 July 1994	SK5679639939; 52°57′14″N 1°09′22″W	1255252	Nottingham Playhouse More images
People's Hall	Nottingham	House	1750	12 July 1972	SK5766540002; 52°57′15″N 1°08′35″W	1254499	People's Hall More images
Railings and gate to forecourt at Willoughby House	Nottingham	Gate	c. 1743	12 July 1972	SK5737939681; 52°57′05″N 1°08′51″W	1254748	Railings and gate to forecourt at Willoughby House
Sheriff House	Nottingham	Town House	1768	11 August 1952	SK5692639748; 52°57′08″N 1°09′15″W	1270499	Sheriff House More images
Shire Hall and adjoining County Gaol	Lace Market	Gate	1770–72	24 October 1988	SK5759239606; 52°57′03″N 1°08′39″W	1254517	Shire Hall and adjoining County Gaol More images
Willoughby House	Nottingham	Town House	c. 1738	11 August 1952	SK5738139665; 52°57′05″N 1°08′51″W	1254559	Willoughby House More images
10 Pelham Street and 2A & 2B High Street	Nottingham	Commercial premises	c. 1905	4 October 1973	SK5739439912; 52°57′13″N 1°08′50″W	1058999	10 Pelham Street and 2A & 2B High Street More images
24 and 26 Low Pavement	Nottingham	Town House	c. 1733	11 August 1952	SK5739739671; 52°57′05″N 1°08′50″W	1254560	24 and 26 Low Pavement More images
19 Castle Gate	Nottingham	Town House	1775	11 August 1952	SK5720439648; 52°57′04″N 1°09′00″W	1246653	19 Castle Gate More images
56 Village Road	Clifton	Aisled House	14th century	14 April 1954	SK5446434997; 52°54′35″N 1°11′30″W	1255237	56 Village Road More images

== Gedling ==
Name	Location	Type	Completed	Date designated	Grid ref. Geo-coordinates	Entry number	Image
Bestwood Lodge Hotel and Terrace Wall	Bestwood Park, Bestwood St. Albans	Country House	1862	13 December 1972	SK5695246506; 53°00′46″N 1°09′09″W	1227444	Bestwood Lodge Hotel and Terrace Wall More images
Bestwood Pumping Station	Bestwood St. Albans	Coal Shed	1871–74	5 September 1972	SK5792848246; 53°01′42″N 1°08′16″W	1265233	Bestwood Pumping Station More images
Emmanuel Church	Bestwood St. Albans	Parish Church	1868	27 April 1987	SK5663046423; 53°00′44″N 1°09′27″W	1235441	Emmanuel Church More images
Winding House and Headstocks at Bestwood Colliery	Bestwood St. Albans	Colliery	Late 19th century	27 April 1987	SK5563947460; 53°01′18″N 1°10′19″W	1235186	Winding House and Headstocks at Bestwood Colliery More images
Church of St Wilfrid	Calverton	Tower	1763	13 October 1966	SK6174049184; 53°02′11″N 1°04′51″W	1235903	Church of St Wilfrid More images
Brewhouse, Crewyard and Mill Barn at Hall Farmhouse	Linby	Brewhouse	Late 18th century	27 April 1987	SK5338051135; 53°03′17″N 1°12′18″W	1265319	Brewhouse, Crewyard and Mill Barn at Hall Farmhouse
Church of St Michael	Linby	Tower	13th century	13 October 1966	SK5345350892; 53°03′09″N 1°12′14″W	1265318	Church of St Michael More images
Boatswain's Monument 30 metres north-east of Newstead Abbey	Newstead Park, Newstead	Commemorative Monument	1808	13 October 1966	SK5423053785; 53°04′43″N 1°11′31″W	1264302	Boatswain's Monument 30 metres north-east of Newstead Abbey More images
The Cannon Fort and adjoining Dock	Newstead Park, Newstead	Dock	c. 1750	13 October 1966	SK5376053823; 53°04′44″N 1°11′56″W	1264406	The Cannon Fort and adjoining Dock More images
Engine house, boiler house and workshop at Papplewick Pumping Station	Ravenshead	Boiler house	1881	18 October 1971	SK5827452136; 53°03′48″N 1°07′55″W	1265301	Engine house, boiler house and workshop at Papplewick Pumping Station
Church of St Swithun	Woodborough	Tower	13th century	13 October 1966	SK6315147711; 53°01′23″N 1°03′36″W	1264188	Church of St Swithun More images
Woodborough Hall	Woodborough	House	circa 1660	15 July 1985	SK6251447760; 53°01′25″N 1°04′10″W	1227555	Upload Photo
Church of the Good Shepherd	Arnold	Roman Catholic Church	1962–64	25 September 1998	SK5805844326; 52°59′35″N 1°08′11″W	1376603	Church of the Good Shepherd More images
Church of St Mary	Arnold	Tower	14th century	24 January 1950	SK5868446146; 53°00′34″N 1°07′37″W	1235987	Church of St Mary More images
Church of St Paul	Daybrook	Parish Church	1892–96	27 April 1987	SK5796645158; 53°00′02″N 1°08′16″W	1236096	Church of St Paul More images

== Mansfield ==
Name	Location	Type	Completed	Date designated	Grid ref. Geo-coordinates	Entry number	Image
Warsop Parish Centre	Warsop	Farmhouse	15th century	28 August 1962	SK5674468837; 53°12′49″N 1°09′06″W	1251896	Warsop Parish Centre More images
Cavendish Monument and attached railings	Mansfield	Commemorative Monument	1849	17 March 1978	SK5384161092; 53°08′39″N 1°11′47″W	1207176	Cavendish Monument and attached railings More images
Church of St Edmund	Mansfield Woodhouse	Parish Church	1304	28 January 1957	SK5401763212; 53°09′48″N 1°11′37″W	1251828	Church of St Edmund More images
Church of St Mark and attached boundary wall	Mansfield	Parish Church	1897	21 March 1994	SK5377060448; 53°08′19″N 1°11′52″W	1214953	Church of St Mark and attached boundary wall More images
Innisdoon and attached garden wall and gate piers	Mansfield	Arts and Crafts house and coach house	1904–05	7 October 1977	SK5361461615; 53°08′56″N 1°11′59″W	1214391	Innisdoon and attached garden wall and gate piers More images
St Peter's House	Mansfield	House	Late 17th century	19 December 1955	SK5406961059; 53°08′38″N 1°11′35″W	1213928	St Peter's House More images
The Old Meeting House	Mansfield	Unitarian Chapel	1702	19 December 1955	SK5360461143; 53°08′41″N 1°12′00″W	1207181	The Old Meeting House More images
The Old Town Hall and attached piers and railings	Mansfield	Civic building (1835–1836)	1836	17 March 1978	SK5382461046; 53°08′38″N 1°11′48″W	1207179	The Old Town Hall and attached piers and railings More images
The Priory	Mansfield Woodhouse	House	20th century	28 January 1957	SK5376163204; 53°09′48″N 1°11′50″W	1251852	The Priory More images
Waverley House	Mansfield	House	1754	19 December 1955	SK5369861217; 53°08′43″N 1°11′55″W	1288092	Waverley House More images

== Newark and Sherwood ==
Name	Location	Type	Completed	Date designated	Grid ref. Geo-coordinates	Entry number	Image
Averham Park House	Averham	House	20th century	11 August 1961	SK7435056417; 53°05′59″N 0°53′28″W	1046003	Upload Photo
The Old House	Bleasby	House	17th century	11 August 1961	SK7194949442; 53°02′15″N 0°55′42″W	1045572	Upload Photo
Church of St Mary of the Purification	Blidworth	Tower	15th century	11 August 1961	SK5856655631; 53°05′41″N 1°07′37″W	1045529	Church of St Mary of the Purification More images
Carlton Hall	Carlton-on-Trent	Country House	1765	7 August 1952	SK7992264026; 53°10′03″N 0°48′21″W	1046012	Carlton Hall More images
Church of St Mary	Carlton-on-Trent	Church	12th century	11 August 1961	SK7994963938; 53°10′00″N 0°48′20″W	1178592	Church of St Mary More images
Church of All Saints	Coddington	Parish Church	13th century	16 January 1967	SK8349254493; 53°04′52″N 0°45′18″W	1157230	Church of All Saints More images
Thatch Cottage and boundary wall	Collingham	House	Late 16th century	17 October 1984	SK8289461317; 53°08′33″N 0°45′44″W	1369947	Thatch Cottage and boundary wall
Church of St Michael	Cotham	Parish Church	12th century	16 January 1967	SK7942447616; 53°01′12″N 0°49′03″W	1178419	Church of St Michael More images
Church of St Andrew	Eakring	Church	19th century	11 August 1961	SK6753662169; 53°09′09″N 0°59′30″W	1370132	Church of St Andrew More images
Church of St Oswald	East Stoke	Church	13th century	16 January 1967	SK7479450061; 53°02′33″N 0°53′09″W	1045578	Church of St Oswald More images
Church of St Giles	Edingley	Church	19th century	11 August 1961	SK6650855862; 53°05′45″N 1°00′30″W	1193510	Church of St Giles More images
Church of All Saints	Elston	Church	13th century	16 January 1967	SK7588247982; 53°01′26″N 0°52′12″W	1370154	Church of All Saints More images
Elston Towers	Elston	Country House	1872	8 May 1980	SK7471548386; 53°01′39″N 0°53′15″W	1370153	Elston Towers More images
Church of St Denis	Morton	Parish Church	1756	11 August 1961	SK7270051357; 53°03′16″N 0°55′01″W	1302376	Church of St Denis More images
Halloughton Manor Farm House	Halloughton	Farmhouse	13th century	7 August 1952	SK6885451765; 53°03′31″N 0°58′27″W	1178664	Halloughton Manor Farm House More images
Church of St Nicholas	Hockerton	Parish Church	12th century	11 August 1961	SK7159656445; 53°06′01″N 0°55′56″W	1045486	Church of St Nicholas More images
Gazebo and garden wall at Kelham Hall	Kelham	Summerhouse	1844–46	19 September 1985	SK7751355543; 53°05′29″N 0°50′38″W	1045983	Gazebo and garden wall at Kelham Hall More images
Church of St Swithun	Kirklington	Tower	17th century	11 August 1961	SK6791957607; 53°06′41″N 0°59′13″W	1045490	Church of St Swithun More images
Church of Holy Trinity	Kirton	Parish Church	13th century	11 August 1961	SK6912069379; 53°13′01″N 0°57′59″W	1156898	Church of Holy Trinity More images
Old Hall Farm House	Kneesall	Farmhouse	19th century	11 August 1966	SK7025564241; 53°10′14″N 0°57′02″W	1156929	Old Hall Farm House More images
Langford Hall	Langford	Country House	1780–90	16 January 1967	SK8233757444; 53°06′28″N 0°46′17″W	1046033	Langford Hall More images
Langford Old Hall	Langford	Farmhouse	Early 19th century	25 February 1952	SK8205858865; 53°07′14″N 0°46′31″W	1369987	Upload Photo
Moorhouse Chapel	Moorhouse, Laxton and Moorhouse	Chapel	1860	25 July 1980	SK7530266780; 53°11′34″N 0°52′28″W	1045631	Moorhouse Chapel More images
The Old Hall	Lowdham	House	Early 17th century	7 August 1952	SK6649746744; 53°00′50″N 1°00′37″W	1045495	Upload Photo
Club Room and stables at rear of Ossington Hotel	Newark-on-Trent	Club	1882	19 May 1971	SK7974654134; 53°04′43″N 0°48′40″W	1196076	Club Room and stables at rear of Ossington Hotel
Concrete footbridge across River Trent	Newark-on-Trent	Footbridge	1915	23 October 1989	SK8014355107; 53°05′14″N 0°48′17″W	1297721	Concrete footbridge across River Trent More images
Former Magnus School and adjoining Headmaster's House and English School	Newark-on-Trent	Teachers House	1817	29 September 1950	SK8004253903; 53°04′35″N 0°48′24″W	1288060	Former Magnus School and adjoining Headmaster's House and English School More images
Former White Hart Hotel	Newark-on-Trent	Inn	c. 1430	29 September 1950	SK7989753840; 53°04′33″N 0°48′32″W	1196426	Former White Hart Hotel More images
Kiln Warehouse	Newark-on-Trent	Kiln	1857	7 August 1989	SK7975554359; 53°04′50″N 0°48′39″W	1196290	Kiln Warehouse
Martin Forster House	Newark-on-Trent	Vicarage	c. 1730	29 September 1950	SK8002353886; 53°04′34″N 0°48′25″W	1196098	Martin Forster House More images
Ossington Hotel and adjoining garden walls and summerhouse	Newark-on-Trent	Garden Wall	1882	19 May 1971	SK7972354108; 53°04′42″N 0°48′41″W	1287626	Ossington Hotel and adjoining garden walls and summerhouse More images
Shalem House 1–4, The Friary	Newark-on-Trent	Apartment	1992	29 September 1950	SK8019454040; 53°04′39″N 0°48′16″W	1215654	Shalem House 1–4, The Friary
40 & 41 Market Place	Newark-on-Trent	Coaching Inn	1721	29 September 1950	SK7987153848; 53°04′33″N 0°48′33″W	1297637	40 & 41 Market Place More images
1, 3, & 5 Bridge Street and 27 & 28 Market Place	Newark-on-Trent	House	c. 1730	29 September 1950	SK7994253880; 53°04′34″N 0°48′29″W	1297635	1, 3, & 5 Bridge Street and 27 & 28 Market Place More images
Former Clinton Arms Hotel	Newark-on-Trent	Coaching Inn	Early 18th century	29 September 1950	SK7985353846; 53°04′33″N 0°48′34″W	1278230	Former Clinton Arms Hotel More images
Church of St George	North Clifton	Parish Church	13th century	16 January 1967	SK8185971259; 53°13′55″N 0°46′30″W	1046053	Church of St George More images
Ollerton Hall	Ollerton	Country House	c. 1700	7 August 1952	SK6547167543; 53°12′03″N 1°01′17″W	1045598	Ollerton Hall More images
Sundial 50 metres east of Church of Holy Rood	Ossington	Sundial	Early 17th century	19 September 1985	SK7594665171; 53°10′42″N 0°51′54″W	1301995	Sundial 50 metres east of Church of Holy Rood More images
Church of St John	Perlethorpe cum Budby	Parish Church	1876	11 August 1961	SK6454970956; 53°13′54″N 1°02′04″W	1045471	Church of St John More images
Sundial 150 metres south of Thoresby Hall	Thoresby Park, Perlethorpe cum Budby	Sundial	Mid-18th century	11 August 1961	SK6384671071; 53°13′58″N 1°02′42″W	1157251	Upload Photo
Orangery, fountain and garden wall at Rufford Abbey	Rufford	Bath House/Orangery	1729	10 July 1975	SK6458964700; 53°10′32″N 1°02′06″W	1370165	Orangery, fountain and garden wall at Rufford Abbey More images
The Gables	South Muskham	Farmhouse	c. 1600	21 November 1974	SK7791757095; 53°06′19″N 0°50′15″W	1369972	The Gables
Winthorpe Bridge carrying bypass over River Trent	South Muskham	Road Bridge	1964	29 May 1998	SK8052856733; 53°06′06″N 0°47′55″W	1323680	Winthorpe Bridge carrying bypass over River Trent More images
Cranfield House and adjoining garden walls	Southwell	Clergy House	1709	7 August 1952	SK7025253896; 53°04′40″N 0°57′10″W	1046145	Cranfield House and adjoining garden walls More images
Gateway and flanking walls at Minster churchyard	Southwell	Gate	Mid-14th century	11 August 1961	SK7004653837; 53°04′38″N 0°57′21″W	1288504	Upload Photo
Norwood Park and the west wing	Norwood Park, Southwell	Country House	cica 1763	7 August 1952	SK6871754683; 53°05′06″N 0°58′32″W	1370212	Norwood Park and the west wing More images
Saracen's Head Hotel	Southwell	Assembly Rooms	1805	7 August 1952	SK7006553921; 53°04′41″N 0°57′20″W	1369925	Saracen's Head Hotel More images
The Residence and Vicars Court and adjoining boundary walls	Southwell	Clergy House	1689	7 August 1952	SK7027953787; 53°04′36″N 0°57′09″W	1211749	The Residence and Vicars Court and adjoining boundary walls More images
Church of St Mary	Staunton	Parish Church	14th century	16 January 1967	SK8052643274; 52°58′51″N 0°48′08″W	1045995	Church of St Mary More images
Staunton Hall and service wing	Staunton	Country House	16th century	15 October 1984	SK8056743213; 52°58′49″N 0°48′05″W	1302335	Staunton Hall and service wing More images
Church of St Helen	Thorney	Parish Church	1850	16 January 1967	SK8592472843; 53°14′44″N 0°42′50″W	1302452	Church of St Helen More images
Thurgarton Priory	Thurgarton	House	13th century	7 August 1952	SK6917549165; 53°02′07″N 0°58′11″W	1045528	Thurgarton Priory More images
Greet House	Upton	Workhouse	1824	8 May 2000	SK7115254284; 53°04′52″N 0°56′21″W	1045931	Greet House More images
Upton Hall	Upton	Country House	17th century	7 August 1952	SK7348054406; 53°04′55″N 0°54′16″W	1179760	Upton Hall More images
Church of St Edmund	Walesby	Parish Church	12th century	11 August 1961	SK6850170754; 53°13′46″N 0°58′31″W	1178711	Church of St Edmund More images
Church of St Swithin	Wellow	Parish Church	12th century	11 August 1961	SK6707466100; 53°11′16″N 0°59′52″W	1370185	Church of St Swithin More images
Winthorpe Hall	Winthorpe	Country House	c. 1760	16 January 1967	SK8121856578; 53°06′01″N 0°47′18″W	1178886	Winthorpe Hall More images

== Rushcliffe ==
Name	Location	Type	Completed	Date designated	Grid ref. Geo-coordinates	Entry number	Image
Ivy Cottage and adjoining walls	Bunny	House	c. 1700	13 October 1966	SK5820829539; 52°51′37″N 1°08′13″W	1277626	Ivy Cottage and adjoining walls More images
Old School incorporating schoolhouse and almshouses	Bunny	Apartment	1986	14 May 1952	SK5833329613; 52°51′39″N 1°08′06″W	1249034	Old School incorporating schoolhouse and almshouses More images
The Manor House	Costock	House	1952	14 May 1952	SK5738626402; 52°49′56″N 1°08′59″W	1260272	Upload Photo
Church of St Mary and All Saints	Hawsworth	Tower	13th century	1 December 1965	SK7528343457; 52°58′59″N 0°52′48″W	1243797	Church of St Mary and All Saints More images
Wall and gazebo at Holme Pierrepont Hall	Holme Pierrepont	Gate	Early 17th century	13 November 1986	SK6269339317; 52°56′51″N 1°04′06″W	1249200	Upload Photo
Church of St Luke	Kinoulton	Church	1793	1 December 1965	SK6765030721; 52°52′11″N 0°59′47″W	1264839	Church of St Luke More images
Langar House	Langar cum Barnstone	Country House	Early 18th century	12 February 1952	SK7225934714; 52°54′18″N 0°55′38″W	1235998	Langar House More images
Church of St Margaret	Owthorpe	Church	Pre-1705	1 December 1965	SK6723433439; 52°53′39″N 1°00′07″W	1236253	Church of St Margaret More images
Church of St Peter and St Paul	Shelford	Cross	10th century	1 December 1965	SK6617142359; 52°58′28″N 1°00′58″W	1250021	Church of St Peter and St Paul More images
Shelford Manor House and attached wall and pier	Shelford and Newton	House	c. 1580	28 November 1972	SK6723343433; 52°59′03″N 1°00′00″W	1039570	Upload Photo
Stanford Hall	Stanford on Soar	Country House	Early 18th century	14 May 1952	SK5588423867; 52°48′34″N 1°10′21″W	1260097	Stanford Hall More images
Church of St Anne	Sutton Bonington	Parish Church	13th century	13 October 1966	SK5074425044; 52°49′14″N 1°14′54″W	1242374	Church of St Anne More images
Church of St Michael	Sutton Bonington	Parish Church	13th century	13 October 1966	SK5042825428; 52°49′27″N 1°15′11″W	1242372	Church of St Michael More images
The Hall	Sutton Bonington	Country House	Early 18th century	13 October 1966	SK5046825299; 52°49′22″N 1°15′09″W	1242389	The Hall More images
Church of All Saints	Thrumpton	Parish Church	13th century	13 October 1966	SK5097431162; 52°52′32″N 1°14′39″W	1242423	Church of All Saints More images
Church of St Helen	West Leake	Parish Church	12th century	13 October 1966	SK5274826428; 52°49′58″N 1°13′07″W	1242473	Church of St Helen More images
Church of St John of Beverley	Whatton-in-the-Vale	Parish Church	11th century	1 December 1965	SK7450139674; 52°56′57″N 0°53′33″W	1243823	Church of St John of Beverley More images
Church of St Peter and St Paul	Widmerpool	Parish Church	14th century	1 December 1965	SK6287428206; 52°50′52″N 1°04′04″W	1242476	Church of St Peter and St Paul More images
Wiverton Hall including service range to rear left	Wiverton Hall	Country House	1814	12 February 1952	SK7133536343; 52°55′11″N 0°56′26″W	1264494	Wiverton Hall including service range to rear left More images
Church of the Holy Rood	Edwalton	Parish Church	12th century	13 December 1949	SK5985035002; 52°54′33″N 1°06′41″W	1302765	Church of the Holy Rood More images
Test Match Hotel	West Bridgford	Public House	1938	4 May 2000	SK5889837182; 52°55′44″N 1°07′31″W	1380283	Test Match Hotel More images

== See also ==
Category:Grade II* listed buildings in Nottinghamshire
