= St Catherine's Church, Cossall =

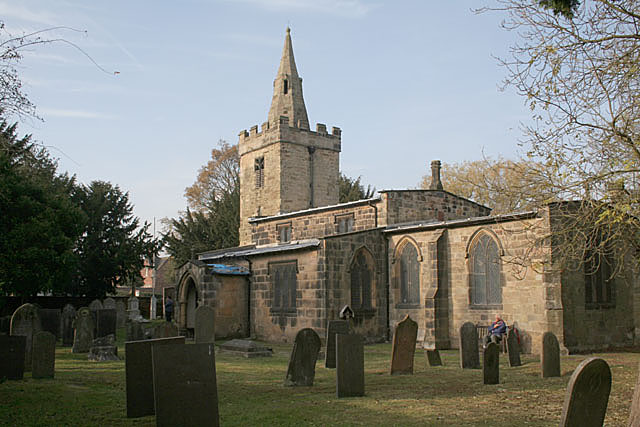
- St Catherine's Church, Cossall
- St Catherine's Church, Cossall
- 52°58′32.81″N 1°16′50.95″W
- OS grid reference: SK 48390 42289
- Location: Cossall
- Country: England
- Denomination: Church of England

History
- Dedication: Catherine of Alexandria

Architecture
- Heritage designation: Grade II* listed

Administration
- Diocese: Diocese of Southwell and Nottingham
- Archdeaconry: Nottingham
- Deanery: Nottingham North
- Parish: Cossall

St Catherine's Church, Cossall is a Grade II* listed parish church in the Church of England in Cossall, Nottinghamshire, England.

== History ==
The church dates from the 13th century and was rebuilt in 1842.

It is part of a joint parish with:

- St Peter's Church, Awsworth
- St Helen's Church, Trowell

The church is the burial place of George Willoughby, who founded the adjacent Willoughby Almshouses in 1685.

== See also ==
- Grade II* listed buildings in Nottinghamshire
- Listed buildings in Cossall
