= Willoughby Almshouses =

Listed building in Nottinghamshire, England

Willoughby Almshouses, Cossall
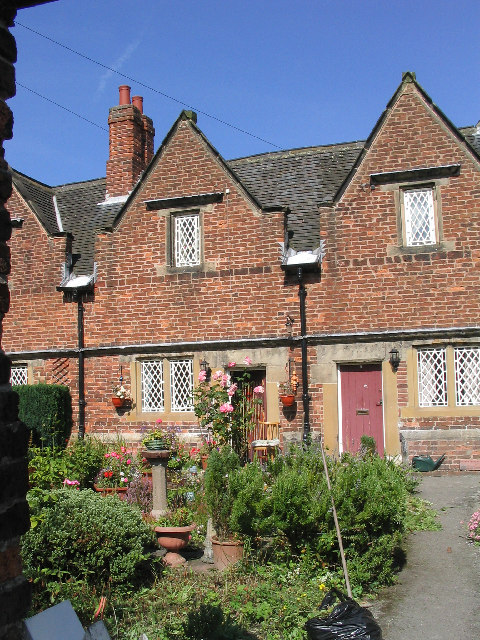

- Location within Nottinghamshire

General information
- Location: Cossall, Nottinghamshire, England
- Coordinates: 52°58′29.94″N 1°16′55.81″W
- Year built: 1685
- Client: George Willoughby

Listed Building – Grade II*
- Official name: Willoughby Almshouses and adjoining boundary wall
- Designated: 14 May 1952
- Reference no.: 1247951

The Willoughby Almshouses were erected in 1685 in Cossall, Nottinghamshire, England and are Grade II* listed buildings.

These were originally for "4 single poor men over 60 years of age and 4 single poor women over 55 years of age".

There was an endowment of a farm at Roston and local land rents to give the residents a pension of £10 per year and a new grey cloth gown worth 3d per yard every two years, and 5 shillings worth of coal yearly.

The charity which supports the almshouses, Charity 214252, is still administered by Lord Middleton, the descendants of George Willoughby.

== See also ==
- Grade II* listed buildings in Nottinghamshire
- Listed buildings in Cossall
