= St Michael the Archangel's Church, Halam =

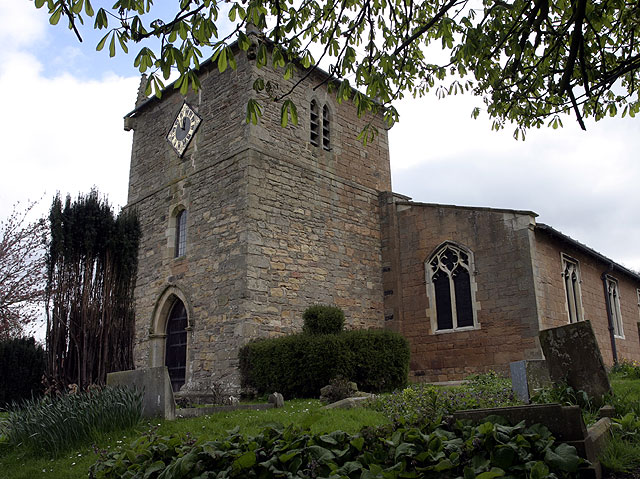
- St Michael the Archangel's Church, Halam
- St Michael the Archangel's Church, Halam
- 53°5′0.47″N 0°59′37.38″W
- OS grid reference: SK 67813 54364
- Location: Halam, Nottinghamshire
- Country: England
- Denomination: Church of England

History
- Dedication: St Michael the Archangel

Architecture
- Heritage designation: Grade I listed

Administration
- Diocese: Diocese of Southwell and Nottingham
- Archdeaconry: Newark
- Deanery: Newark and Southwell
- Parish: Halam

St Michael the Archangel's Church, Halam is a Grade I listed parish church in the Church of England in Halam, Nottinghamshire.

== History ==
St Michael's Church Halam is a Norman church, dating from the 12th century, and has some fine examples of stained glass, in particular the 15th-century medieval 'Adam and Eve’ window located in the chancel. It was restored from 1884 to 1889. It has a lovely Norman chancel arch much praised by Nicholas Pevsner.

The church is in a joint parish with St Giles' Church, Edingley.

== Organ ==
The church contains a pipe organ installed in 2010 by Jonathan Wallace of Henry Groves & Son. A specification of the organ can be found on the National Pipe Organ Register.

== See also ==
- Grade I listed buildings in Nottinghamshire
- Listed buildings in Halam, Nottinghamshire
