= St Martin's Church, North Leverton =

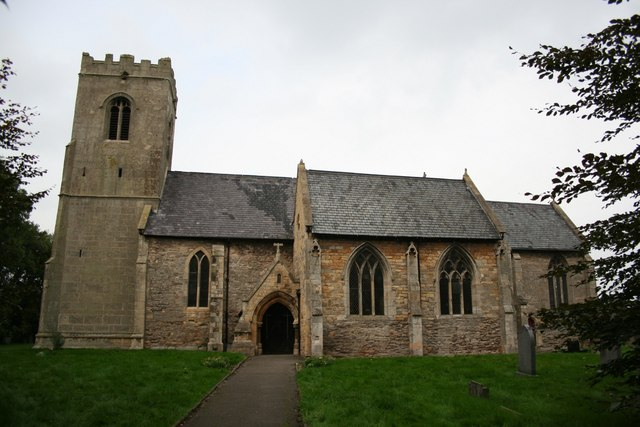
- St Martin's Church, North Leverton
- St Martin's Church, North Leverton
- 53°19′51.19″N 0°49′16.41″W
- OS grid reference: SK 78712 82261
- Location: North Leverton
- Country: England
- Denomination: Church of England

History
- Dedication: St Martin

Architecture
- Heritage designation: Grade I listed

Administration
- Diocese: Diocese of Southwell and Nottingham
- Archdeaconry: Newark
- Deanery: Newark and Southwell
- Parish: North Leverton with Habblesthorpe

St Martin's Church, North Leverton is a Grade I listed parish church in the Church of England in North Leverton.

== History ==
The church was built in the 12th century, the oldest part of it being the south doorway of ca. 1200. The ornate window tracery of the south aisle and the chancel, dating from ca. 1300–40, is the chief feature of interest. The west tower is Perpendicular. It was restored in the 19th century.

== See also ==
- Grade I listed buildings in Nottinghamshire
- Listed buildings in North Leverton with Habblesthorpe
