= Listed buildings in Edingley =

Edingley is a civil parish in the Newark and Sherwood district of Nottinghamshire, England. The parish contains eight listed buildings that are recorded in the National Heritage List for England. Of these, one is at Grade II*, the middle of the three grades, and the others are at Grade II, the lowest grade. The parish contains the village of Edingley and the surrounding countryside. The listed buildings consist of a house, farmhouses, a church, headstones in the churchyard, and a barn partly converted onto a mill.

== Key ==
Grade	Criteria
II*	Particularly important buildings of more than special interest
II	Buildings of national importance and special interest

== Buildings ==
Name and location	Photograph	Date	Notes	Grade
St Giles' Church; 53.09585°N 1.00824°W		12th century	The church has been altered and extended through the centuries, the chancel was rebuilt in 1844, and the church was restored in about 1897 by C. Hodgson Fowler, who added the bellcote. The church is built in stone with tile roofs, and consists of a nave and a chancel, with the bellcote on the west gable. The doorway dates from the 12th century, and has engaged columns with scalloped capitals, imposts, a round arch with two moulded orders decorated with chevrons, and a hood mould.	II*
Pair of headstones 53.09595°N 1.00819°W	—	1690s	The headstones are in the churchyard of St Giles' Church to the north of the church. They are in stone and consist of two rectangular headstones.	II
Church Farmhouse; 53.09589°N 1.00773°W		Early 18th century	A house and barn, later combined, in red brick, partly on a plinth, with dogtooth eaves and a tile roof. There are two storeys and eight bays. On the front are a semicircular porch, doorways, and casement windows, some with segmental heads.	II
Manor Farmhouse; 53.09550°N 1.00901°W	—	Early 18th century	The farmhouse is in red brick on a plinth, with floor bands, dentilled and dogtooth eaves, and a pantile roof with stone coped gables and kneelers. There are two storeys and an attic, and an L-shaped plan, consisting of a front range of four bays, and a projecting gabled wing on the right. On the front is a doorway with a lean-to hood and a mix of casement and horizontally-sliding sash windows., some under segmental arches. To the left is a wing with a single storey, a cellar and attic.	II
Osmanthorpe Manor; 53.10458°N 0.98870°W	—	Early 18th century	A red brick house on a plinth, with a hipped tile roof. There are two storeys and attics, and an L-shaped plan, with a front range of five bays, and a later rear wing. In the centre is a gabled porch, and a doorway with a chamfered surround and a segmental head. This is flanked by canted bay windows with polygonal roofs. Above the doorway is a horizontally-sliding sash window, the other windows in the upper floor are casements, and all have flush wedge lintels. In the roof are two half-hipped dormers.	II
Norwood Park Farmhouse; 53.09720°N 1.00988°W		Mid 18th century	The farmhouse is in red brick, with dogtooth eaves, and a pantile roof with coped gables and kneelers. There are two storeys and four bays. The doorway has a hood on two brackets, and the windows are casements under segmental arches. To the left is a gabled wing with a single storey and attic, and two bays.	II
Hall Farmhouse; 53.09537°N 1.00594°W		Late 18th century	The farmhouse is in red brick, with dogtooth eaves, and a pantile roof with stone coped gables and kneelers. There are two storeys and attics, a front range of three bays, and rear wings of one and two storeys. In the centre is a doorway with a fanlight, the windows are sashes, and all the openings have wedge lintels and keystones.	II
Springs Farm Barn and Mill; 53.10369°N 1.00443°W	—	Mid 19th century	A barn partly converted into a mill, it is in red brick with a tile roof, hipped on the left. There are two storeys and four bays. The openings include doorways, some with segmental heads, vents, and entrances for pigeons. Other features include external steps and a footbridge. Inside is machinery for grinding stones.	II
