= Ossington Coffee Tavern, Newark on Trent =

Listed building in Nottinghamshire, England

Coordinates: 53°04′42″N 00°48′42″W

Ossington Coffee Tavern
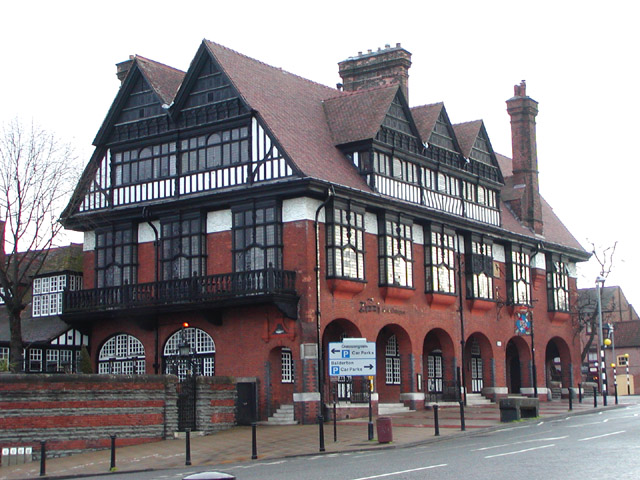
- Ossington Coffee Tavern, Newark-on-Trent

- Location in Nottinghamshire
- Alternative names: Ossington Coffee Palace; Ossington Hotel; The Ossington

General information
- Architectural style: Vernacular Revival
- Location: Newark-on-Trent, Nottinghamshire, England
- Groundbreaking: 10 November 1881
- Opened: 23 November 1882

Design and construction
- Architects: Ernest George and Harold Peto

Listed Building – Grade II*
- Official name: Ossington Hotel and adjoining garden walls and summerhouse
- Designated: 19 May 1971
- Reference no.: 1287626

The Ossington Coffee Tavern is a Grade II* listed building in Newark-on-Trent, Nottinghamshire, England.

== History ==
The foundation stone was laid on 10 November 1881 when Harold Peto representing his firm of architects placed a sealed bottle within a stone containing the current coins of the realm and an inscription as follows:

This building was erected and endowed in the year 1882 by Charlotte Viscountess Ossington, third daughter of William Henry Cavendish, fourth Duke of Portland, and widow of the first Viscount Ossington, late Speaker of the House of Commons, and given by her to the town of Newark-upon-Trent, in token of her interest in the prosperity of the town, near which she has resided for more than half a century, and with the earnest desire to promote the cause of temperance therein. The land on which this Coffee Tavern is erected was purchased by Viscountess Ossington from Philip Handley, Esquire of Newark, at the cost of 4549l. for this purpose. The building, designed by Messrs, Ernest George and Peto, architects, Argyll-street, London, W., for a Coffee Tavern and Hostelry, at the cost of some 12,000l., exclusive of the site, and contains on the ground floor - general coffee room, boys'-room, kitchen, offices, &c. On the first floor, assembly-rooms for market dinners and other large gatherings; also a reading room, library, and club room for Masonic and other benefit societies. On the second floor there is a billiard-room and dormitories for travellers. There is also stabling for 30 horses, with cart shed, &c., for farmers on market days, a tea garden for refreshments in summer time, and a bowling alley. The work was carried out by Messrs. Smith and Lunn, buildings, of Newark-on-Trent, Mr. C. Leach being clerk of the works.

The tavern was opened on 23 November 1882 and named after Lady Ossington, widow of Evelyn Denison, 1st Viscount Ossington, who had funded its construction. The final cost of construction was £13,500 (equivalent to £1,343,800 in 2023) and Lady Ossington endowed it with £20,000. Including the initial cost of the land, the total contribution from Lady Ossington was £38,049 (equivalent to £3,787,400 in 2023).

The carving of the woodwork, including the ceilings and cornices was by Walker Smith of London. The river side of the tavern included a garden planted with limes which was intended as a German "Bier Garten" to provide a space for outdoor musical entertainment in the summer. The garden also contained a large oak summer-house, and a flagstaff 65 feet (20 m) tall. On the south east of the tavern facing Castle Gate was another garden planted with acacias and enclosed with iron railings. The establishment also included stables for 48 horses and a carriage-house. Messrs Benham and Sons of London equipped the kitchen with the latest facilities.

The building was not a successful commercial venture as a temperance tavern and in 1889 it became a private hotel.

In 1942 it was taken over by the Air Ministry to accommodate airmen from RAF Winthorpe.

In 1971 it was designated a Grade II* listed building.

In 2014 it was sold to become a Zizzi pizza restaurant with other residential and retail units. In 2021 this branch of Zizzi's closed, leaving the ground floor empty.

In January 2024, Stray's café and bistro moved from their Middlegate location in Newark to The Ossington and returned it to its original purpose. In March 2025, it was announced that Stray's was closing.

== See also ==
- Grade II* listed buildings in Nottinghamshire
- Listed buildings in Newark-on-Trent
