= Peter Glazebrook =

Vegetable grower in England

Peter Glazebrook is a retired surveyor who later became a vegetable grower from Halam in Nottinghamshire, England.

He held 15 world records over a 29-year career, including the longest beetroot and parsnip, and the heaviest onion, potato, cauliflower, and bell pepper, as well as the largest runner bean leaf. The world’s longest beetroot and parsnip measured 21 feet (6.4 m) and 19 feet (5.8 m) 5 inches (13 cm) respectively; the world’s heaviest onion weighed 18 pounds (8.2 kg) potato, 11 pounds (5.0 kg) and the cauliflower, which weighs 60 pounds (27 kg) and is 6 feet (1.8 m) in diameter.

From 2014 until September 2017, Glazebrook also held the world record for the heaviest carrot, weighing in at 20 pounds (9.1 kg). Glazebrook also lost his world record for the heaviest tomato to Douglas Smith.
