= Elite Picture Theatre, Nottingham =

Former cinema in Nottingham, England

Elite Cinema, Nottingham
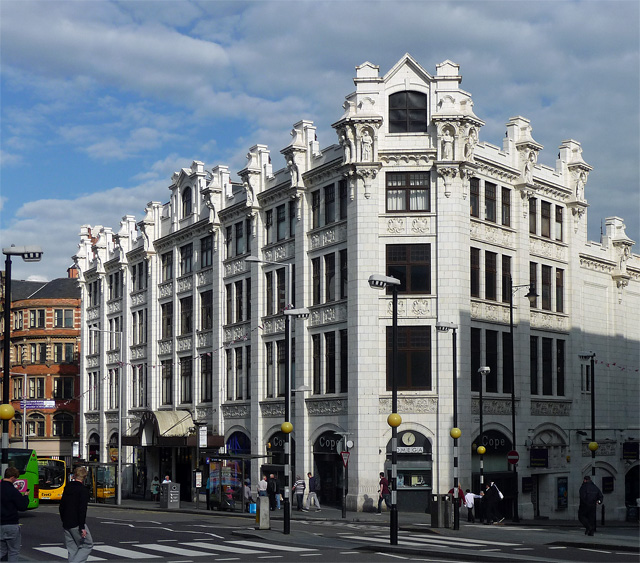

- Location within Nottingham
- Former names: Elite Picture House
- Address: Upper Parliament Street, Nottingham
- Coordinates: 52°57′17.9″N 1°9′3.8″W
- Capacity: 1,477 persons

Construction
- Opened: 22 August 1921
- Closed: March 1977
- Architects: Adamson & Kinns

Listed Building – Grade II*
- Official name: Elite Building
- Designated: 12 July 1972
- Reference no.: 1254539

The Elite Picture Theatre was a cinema open from 1921 to 1977 in Nottingham, England. It subsequently operated as a bingo hall for around 15 years and is now a Grade II* listed building converted for retail and office use.

== History ==
The cinema was designed by the firm of Adamson & Kinns of London in the Beaux-Arts style, with 250 tons of steel frame, concrete floors and expensive white Hathernware tiling facade manufactured by the Hathern Station Brick & Terra Cotta Company, surmounted by statues on the upper portion. The interior was decorated by Fred A. Foster, and the fittings included a concert organ by Willis-Lewis, a ballroom, a restaurant, a tea room and Louis XVI style cafe. The marble terrazzo work, steps and flooring were provided by the Marble Mosaic Company of Bristol.

It opened for business on 22 August 1922, with a luncheon hosted by Mr. T. Shipstone, chairman of the directors of the theatre, with the Mayor of Nottingham, Alderman Herbert Bowles and the Sheriff John H. Freckingham in attendance. There was then a private showing of Mary Pickford in Pollyanna, and the theatre was opened to the public later that day. The first programme included Pollyanna and the Adventures of Sherlock Holmes (The Beryl Coronet).

After the cinema closed in 1977 it operated as a bingo hall for around 15 years. It is now a Grade II* listed building and serves as a space for retail and office use.

== The cinema organs ==
The cinema opened with a large pipe organ built either side of the screen at a cost of £10,000 (equivalent to £423,200 in 2025). It was designed by Major F.J. Bullen of London and erected by Willis and Lewis of Brixton. The first musical director was Franklyn Glynn of Wolverhampton. This organ was retained until 1929 when it was removed and transferred to Brangwyn Hall in Swansea.

The organ was replaced in 1930 when the cinema was upgraded from silent to talking films and a new instrument was opened. It was built by the firm of John Compton. It was intended to be played whenever a silent film was shown and to connect up other features of the programme.

== See also ==
- Grade II* listed buildings in Nottinghamshire
- Listed buildings in Nottingham (Bridge ward)
