= Listed buildings in Halam, Nottinghamshire =

Halam is a civil parish in the Newark and Sherwood district of Nottinghamshire, England. The parish contains 20 listed buildings that are recorded in the National Heritage List for England. Of these, one is listed at Grade I, the highest of the three grades, and the others are at Grade II, the lowest grade. The parish contains the village of Halam and the surrounding countryside. Most of the listed buildings are houses, cottages and associated structures, farmhouses and farm buildings, including three pigeoncotes. The other listed buildings consist of a church, a mill with an attached house and a footbridge, and a public house.

== Key ==
Grade	Criteria
I	Buildings of exceptional interest, sometimes considered to be internationally important
II	Buildings of national importance and special interest

== Buildings ==
Name and location	Photograph	Date	Notes	Grade
St Michael the Archangel's Church, wall and railings 53.08225°N 0.98907°W		12th century	The church has been altered and extended through the centuries, and it was restored and extended in 1884 by Ewan Christian. The church is built in stone with roofs of slate and lead, and consists of a nave, a south aisle, a north porch, a south chapel, a chancel and a west tower. The tower is squat, on a chamfered plinth, with two stages, gargoyles at the corners, and a pyramidal roof with corner crocketed pinnacles, a finial, and an arrow weathervane. It has a west doorway with a pointed arch, imposts and a hood mould, above which is a round-headed window with a chamfered surround. In the upper stage is a clock face on the west side, and two-light bell openings on the other sides. Extending from the chancel is a low stone wall with decorative iron railings forming a rectangle.	I
Barn Cottage; 53.08296°N 0.98872°W	—	Mid 17th century	The cottage was extended in the 18th century and was at one time a post office. The earlier part has a timber framed core, encased in brick, and the rest is in red brick, with partial dentilled eaves, and a pantile roof hipped on the right. There are two storeys and two bays, the left bay recessed, and a lean-to and later wing at the rear. On the front is a doorway with a porch on wooden posts. To its left is a tripartite casement window, and the other windows are tripartite horizontally-sliding sashes, those in the ground floor with segmental heads.	II
Hill Farmhouse; 53.08343°N 0.98811°W		Late 17th century	A farmhouse in red brick on a stone plinth, with string courses, a modillion eaves cornice, and a pantile roof with brick coped gables. There are two storeys and a T-shaped plan, with a main range of two bays, a rear wing and lean-tos. The windows are casements.	II
Barn, Walnut Tree Cottage; 53.08060°N 0.99382°W		Late 17th century	The barn has a timber framed core, and it was encased in red brick in the late 18th century. It has a pantile roof, there is some blue brick diapering in the left gable, and the barn contains a large double plank door.	II
Former Plough public house 53.08361°N 0.98913°W		c. 1700	The public house, later a private house, is in red brick with blue brick diapering, on a rendered plinth, and has a tile roof. The main range has two storeys and an attic, and three bays, and to the left is a later single-storey extension. The central doorway has a hood on brackets, and is flanked by casement windows with segmental heads. In the upper floor are sash windows, and in the right gable is a horizontally-sliding sash window.	II
Mill, attached house and bridge 53.08894°N 0.99097°W		Early 18th century	The mill is in stone and patched in brick, with a pantile roof. There is a single story and a loft and two bays, and a brick lean-to on the right. It contains doorways and windows. To the left is a house in red brick, with a stone left gable wall, two storeys and three bays. In the centre is a gabled porch, and the windows are sashes with rendered wedge lintels. In front of the mill is a footbridge in stone and concrete, with a single brick arch at the rear.	II
Ashdene; 53.08069°N 0.99333°W		Mid 18th century	The house is in red brick, with floor bands, dogtooth eaves and a pantile roof. There are two storeys and attics, and a T-shaped plan, with a front range of three bays, and single-storey extensions on the left. Most of the windows are sashes and there is one casement window.	II
Pigeoncote, Halam Dale; 53.08127°N 0.99017°W		Mid 18th century	The pigeoncote, later used for other purposes, is in red brick, and has a floor band, a raised eaves band and a pyramidal pantile roof. There are two storeys and a single bay. On the north side is a carriage archway, above which is a blocked segmental-arched opening. In the west wall is a segmental-arched doorway in the upper floor, and the south side has a doorway with a stable door and above it is a segmental-arched fixed light. Inside there are nesting boxes.	II
Pigeoncote, Manor Farm; 53.08009°N 0.99536°W	—	Mid 18th century	The pigeoncote is in red brick, with a floor band, a pantile roof, two storeys and two bays. A flight of steps leads up to an upper floor doorway and to its right is a fixed light. In the gable walls is blue brick diapering, and two rows of blocked bird entrances. At the rear are two stable doors.	II
The Waggon public house 53.08394°N 0.98938°W		1752	The public house was extended in the 19th century. The original part is in rendered brick, with a floor band, dogtooth eaves, and a roof of slate at the front and pantile at the rear. There are two storeys and attics and two bays. In the ground floor are two canted bay windows, and the upper floor contains sash windows, between which is an initialled and dated plaque. The extension to the right projects, and is in red brick on a rendered plinth, with dentilled eaves and a slate roof. There are two storeys and a single bay. In the ground floor is a doorway with marginal lights, and the upper floor contains a sash window. At the rear are wings and extensions.	II
Grange Farmhouse; 53.07275°N 1.00913°W		Late 18th century	The farmhouse is in red brick with stone dressings, dogtooth eaves and a pantile roof. There are two storeys and attics, a main range of three bays, and a two-storey single-bay wing on the left. In the main range and in the wings are doorways, each with a hood on brackets. The windows in the main range are casements, and in the wing is a horizontally-sliding sash window.	II
Barn, Manor Farm; 53.08007°N 0.99501°W	—	Late 18th century	The barn is in stone with a pantile roof, two storeys and a loft, and three bays. On the front and rear are porches, and the barn also contains a doorway, a fixed light and slit vents.	II
Manor House; 53.07969°N 0.99436°W		Late 18th century	The house is in rendered brick with dentilled eaves and a pantile roof. There are two storeys and four bays, the right bay taller and projecting. On the front is a porch with a parapet, the windows are sashes, and in the right bay is a gabled half-dormer.	II
Pigeoncote and attached stable block, Manor House; 53.07948°N 0.99469°W		Late 18th century	The pigeoncote and stable block, later converted for residential use, are in red brick, rendered at the base, with dentilled eaves and pantile roofs. The pigeoncote has crow-stepped gables with kneelers, two storeys and a single bay, and the stable block has one storey and a loft, and two bays.	II
Manor Farmhouse; 53.08030°N 0.99464°W	—	1795	The farmhouse was later extended, the early part is in stone, and the later part is in red brick. It is on a plinth, and has a moulded eaves cornice and a hipped tile roof. There are two storeys, a main range of three bays, and extensions to the left and the rear. The central doorway has panelled pilasters, impost blocks, an entablature and a fanlight, and the windows are sashes. Under the eaves is a re-set gargoyle, and next to it is a datestone.	II
Holly Cottage; 53.08333°N 0.98935°W	—	c. 1800	The cottage is roughcast, with dentilled eaves and a pantile roof. There are two storeys, three bays and a rear lean-to. The central doorway has a fanlight and a hood on brackets, and the windows are horizontally-sliding sashes.	II
Goldhill Farmhouse; 53.09487°N 0.98471°W		1810	The farmhouse is in red brick on a stone plinth, with stone dressings, a moulded cornice, and a hipped slate roof. There are three storeys, a main range of three bays, and a later recessed extension on the right. The central doorway has an architrave, a fanlight, imposts and a keystone. Above the doorway is a round-arched window in both floors, the other windows in the lower two floors are Venetian windows, and in the top floor are two Diocletian windows.	II
Church Farmhouse; 53.08300°N 0.98931°W		Early 19th century	The farmhouse is in red brick with dentilled eaves and a pantile roof. There are two storeys and three bays. The central round-headed doorway has a semicircular fanlight, and the windows are sashes with flush brick wedge lintels.	II
Littledale Cottage; 53.09071°N 1.00146°W	—	Early 19th century	A stone house with a slate roof, two storeys and three bays. The doorway is in the centre, the windows are casements, and all the openings have segmental-arched heads.	II
Outbuilding, Ashdene; 53.08069°N 0.99371°W		Mid 19th century	The outbuilding is in red brick with a raised eaves band and a pantile roof. There is a single storey, and it contains a single opening with a wooden grille, the slats forming lozenges.	II
