= Subscription Mill, North Leverton =

Listed windmill in Nottinghamshire, England

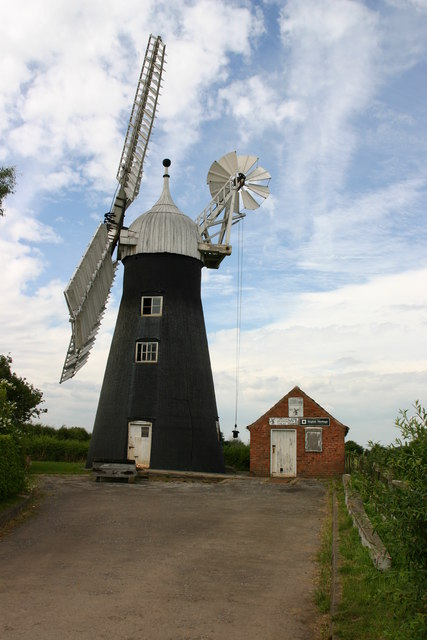
- Subscription Mill, July 2005

Origin
- Mill name: Subscription Mill
- Mill location: North Leverton, Nottinghamshire, England
- Grid reference: SK 775 820
- Coordinates: 53.32940°N 0.83770°W
- Year built: 1813

Information
- Purpose: Corn mill
- Type: Tower mill
- Storeys: Four
- No. of sails: Four
- Type of sails: Patent sails
- Winding: Fantail
- Fantail blades: Eight
- Auxiliary power: Tractor
- No. of pairs of millstones: Two, plus one pair not wind powered
Listed Building – Grade II*
Official name	North Leverton Windmill
Designated	28 February 1952
Reference no.	1234469

Subscription Mill (also known as North Leverton Windmill) is a Grade II* listed commercially working tower mill at North Leverton in Nottinghamshire, England, that was built in 1813.

== History ==
Subscription Mill was built in 1813 by local farmers to mill their grain. It served the villages of Fenton, Habblesthorpe, North Leverton and Sturton le Steeple. The Subscription Mill Company was formed. The mill was built to grind corn for members of the company, and also for local farmers and the poor. In 1884 the mill was extended and gained an extra floor. The windmill has continued to work through all of its life, making it unique. In 1952 the windmill was designated a Grade II* listed building. In 1956 a new limited company was formed. In July 1959, a sail was struck by lightning and damaged. Repairs costing £3,000 were carried out with a grant and loan from Nottinghamshire County Council, and grants from the Council for the Preservation of Rural England, the Ministry of Works and Retford Rural District Council. The works were carried out by Thompson's, the Alford, Lincolnshire millwrights. The mill was again struck by lightning in 1972. The mill was repaired the next year.

== Description ==
The mill has four floors and is built to the Lincolnshire style. It has four Patent sails mounted on a cross, an Ogee cap and an eight bladed fantail. There are three sets of millstones, two of which are wind-driven, and one set driven from an external engine/tractor.

== Public access ==
The windmill is entirely maintained by a group of volunteers, and is open to the public every Saturday from 11:00 am whilst 4:00 pm during spring and summer seasons, with an earlier closing time of 3:00 pm during autumn and winter. Admission is free but there is a donation box towards the upkeep of the mill.

North Leverton Windmill holds an annual grand open weekend, "Family Fun Weekend", in early September. In addition to the windmill and visitor centre being open, there is a small festival atmosphere with craft stalls, food & drink stalls, local farming machinery displays and a car show during the day. In the evening, live music from local bands entertain the crowd.

== See also ==
- Grade II* listed buildings in Nottinghamshire
- Listed buildings in North Leverton with Habblesthorpe
