= 24–26 Low Pavement =

Listed building in Nottingham, England

Coordinates: 52°57′4.9″N 1°8′50″W

24–26 Low Pavement, Nottingham
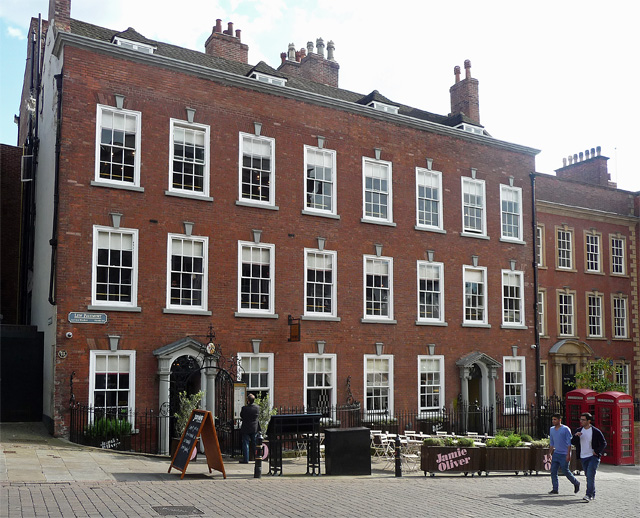
- 24–26 Low Pavement, Nottingham

- Location within Nottingham

General information
- Location: Nottingham
- Construction started: 1733
- Completed: 1734
- Client: Francis Gawthern

Listed Building – Grade II*
- Official name: 24 and 26, Low Pavement
- Designated: 11 August 1952
- Reference no.: 1254560

Listed Building – Grade II*
- Official name: Gate and railings to forecourt of number 24 and 26
- Designated: 12 July 1972
- Reference no.: 1270638

24–26 Low Pavement are a pair of Grade II* listed buildings on Low Pavement in Nottingham, England.

== History ==
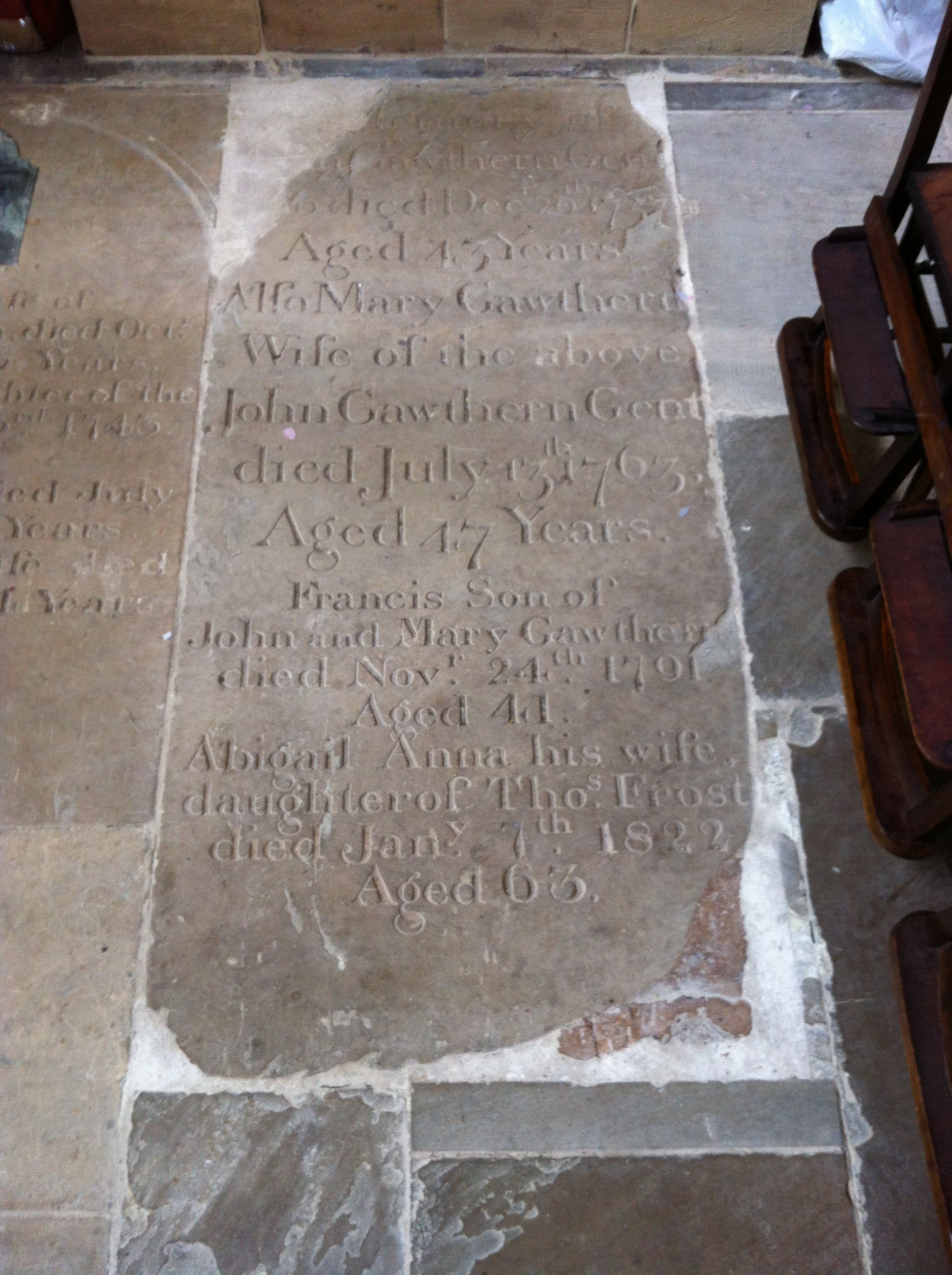
Memorial slab to John Gawthern (d. 1757) and wife Mary (d. 1763), Francis Gawthern (d. 1791) and Abigail Gawthern d. 1822)

The houses were built for Francis Gawthern in 1733 who built them on the site of Vault Hall, a former mansion house of the Plumptre family. Gawthern moved into No. 26 in 1734. The gates and railings on the forecourt were also erected at the same time and are separately Grade II* listed.

In 1783 No. 26 was occupied by Francis Gawthern's great-nephew, also called Francis, who married Abigail Frost that year. Abigail Gawthern lived until 1822 and her diary survived; it is a remarkable record of the history of Nottingham from 1751 until 1810. No. 26 became known as Gawthern House. In her diary for 21 August 1798, she records that her visitors were Lord Byron, the two Miss Parkyns (of Bunny Hall), and the two Master Smiths from Wilford Hall. Abigail Gawthern was buried in St Mary's Church, where her memorial slab was discovered in 2012 during the restoration of the church floor.

=== Recent Use ===
In July 2020, the building became home to The Magic Garden, a bar and restaurant which opened as a pop up during Covid 19.

The venue was established by the team behind several Nottingham Hospitality venues, including Hockley Arts Club, Das Kino, Penny Lane and The Blind Rabbit.

The Magic Garden incorporates the historic townhouse and its south-facing terrace and rear garden.

The Venue offers food, drink and private events and is. quoted as saying it offers the largest beer garden in Nottingham city centre.

== See also ==
- Grade II* listed buildings in Nottinghamshire
- Listed buildings in Nottingham (Bridge ward)
