= Listed buildings in Cossall =

Cossall is a civil parish in the Borough of Broxtowe, Nottinghamshire, England. The parish contains six listed buildings that are recorded in the National Heritage List for England. Of these, two are listed at Grade II*, the middle of the three grades, and the others are at Grade II, the lowest grade. The parish contains the village of Cossall and the surrounding area. All the listed buildings are in the village, and consist of a church, two war memorials in the churchyard, a row of almshouses, and two cottages.

== Key ==
Grade	Criteria
II*	Particularly important buildings of more than special interest
II	Buildings of national importance and special interest

== Buildings ==
Name and location	Photograph	Date	Notes	Grade
St Catherine's Church; 52.97582°N 1.28082°W		13th century	The oldest part of the church is the tower, and the body of the church was rebuilt and enlarged in 1842, reusing medieval masonry. It is built in stone with a lead roof, and consists of a nave with a clerestory, north and south aisles, a south porch, a chancel with a vestry, and a west tower. The tower has two stages, a chamfered plinth, a string course, moulded eaves, and an embattled parapet. In the lower stage is an eye-shaped window containing tracery, and the upper stage contains flat-headed bell openings, also with tracery. On the tower is a recessed octagonal spire, with gabled lucarnes and a ball finial.	II*
Glebe Farm Cottage; 52.97564°N 1.28169°W	—	17th century	The cottage has a timber framed core, it is encased in red brick and some stone, and has a pantile roof. There are two storeys and two bays. On the front are horizontally-sliding sash windows, and at the rear is exposed timber framing and a casement window.	II
Willoughby Almshouses and wall 52.97598°N 1.28186°W		1685	A row of eight almshouses, with a central chapel later converted into accommodation. They are in brick on chamfered plinths, and have tile roofs with moulded coped gables and parapets. There are two storeys, the former chapel is taller, and on its front is a sundial. Each of the flanking houses has one gabled bay, in the ground floor is a doorway and a two-light mullioned window, and above is a single-light window; all the windows have lattice glazing and hood moulds. The courtyard is enclosed by walls with half-round coping, and contain gateways with square piers surmounted by ball finials.	II*
Church Cottage; 52.97601°N 1.28125°W		Mid 18th century	A brick house with stone dressings, floor bands, dentilled tile eaves and a pantile roof. There are two storeys and an attic, two bays, and a full-width lean-to at the rear. In the centre is a porch and a doorway with a segmental head, and the windows are casements.	II
Waterloo memorial 52.97575°N 1.28105°W		1877	The memorial in the churchyard of St Catherine's Church commemorates three men of the village who fought in the Battle of Waterloo, two of whom lost their lives. It consists of a white marble column, on a chamfered square plinth and a rectangular stone base. The column is encircled by a laurel wreath and surmounted by a carved leaf finial. At the base of the memorial is a carved plumed helmet, a breastplate, and the crossed sabres of a Life Guardsman, and on the plinth is an inscription.	II
War memorial 52.97587°N 1.28101°W	—	1920	The war memorial is in the churchyard of St Catherine's Church. It consists of an obelisk in white marble, with relief carvings of a soldier's peaked cap, a sword with a sash, a laurel wreath, and a branch of oak leaves and acorns. This stands on a plinth with two square stepped bases, and a square two-tier platform of granite. On the front faces of the plinth and the base are inscriptions and the names of those lost in the two World Wars.	II
