= Listed buildings in North Leverton with Habblesthorpe =

North Leverton with Habblesthorpe is a civil parish in the Bassetlaw District of Nottinghamshire, England. The parish contains 20 listed buildings that are recorded in the National Heritage List for England. Of these, one is listed at Grade I, the highest of the three grades, one is at Grade II*, the middle grade, and the others are at Grade II, the lowest grade. The parish contains the village of North Leverton with Habblesthorpe and the surrounding area. Most of the listed buildings are houses, cottages and associated structures, farmhouses and farm buildings, and the others consist of a church, a windmill and an associated cottage, a former Sunday school and a war memorial.

== Key ==
Grade	Criteria
I	Buildings of exceptional interest, sometimes considered to be internationally important
II*	Particularly important buildings of more than special interest
II	Buildings of national importance and special interest

== Buildings ==
Name and location	Photograph	Date	Notes	Grade
St Martin's Church, North Leverton; 53.33143°N 0.81943°W		12th century	The church has been altered and extended through the centuries, including restorations in 1847 and in 1876–80. It is built in stone with slate roofs, and consists of a nave, a south aisle, a south porch, a chancel and a west tower. The tower has two stages, diagonal buttresses, a string course, an eaves band with gargoyles, and an embattled parapet. In the west side is a doorway with a Tudor arch, above which is a triple lancet window with a hood mould, on the south side are three stair lights, and the bell openings have two lights and hood moulds.	I
Habblesthorpe Manor House; 53.33063°N 0.81116°W		Early 17th century	The house, which was extended in the 19th century, is in colourwashed brick on a plinth, and has pantile roofs with tumbled coped gables. There are two storeys and an L-shaped plan, with a main range of three bays, and a later service wing with a single storey and two bays. The house has a lean-to porch, and the windows are casements, most are mullioned, and some have hood moulds.	II
Ivy House; 53.33018°N 0.82304°W		17th century	A brick house, partly colourwashed, on a plinth, with floor bands, rebated eaves, and a hipped pantile roof. There are two storeys and attics, and a T-shaped plan, with a single-storey service wing. In the centre of the south front is a gabled bay, to the left is a projecting bay with a shouldered gable, and between them is a porch. The windows are a mix of casements and sashes, most with segmental heads.	II
White Lodge and outbuilding 53.32888°N 0.82224°W		17th century	The house is timber framed with brick nogging, it is partly rendered and whitewashed, and has a pantile roof. There are two storeys, two bays, and a single storey outbuilding on the left. The windows in the main block are horizontally-sliding sashes, some with segmental heads, and in the outbuilding is a casement window.	II
North Leverton Manor House; 53.33059°N 0.82602°W		Early 18th century	A brick house on a plinth, with a floor band, cogged and dentilled eaves, and a hipped pantile roof. There are two storeys and an L-shaped plan, with a main range of five bays, a single-storey service wing on the left, and a rear wing. The central doorway has a moulded surround, a fanlight, paterae, and a hood, and the windows are sashes with rubbed brick heads.	II
The Granary; 53.33015°N 0.81708°W	—	18th century	The threshing barn, later converted, has a timber framed core, brick walls, and a half-hipped pantile roof. There are two storeys, four bays, and a lean-to at each end. It contains doorways, a hatch, a panel, vents, and a gabled dormer.	II
Yew Tree Farm House; 53.33061°N 0.81735°W		18th century	The farmhouse is in brick with cogged and dentilled eaves and a pantile roof. There are two storeys, a double depth plan, and three bays. The central doorway has a fanlight, it is flanked by sash windows, on the upper floor are casement windows, and all the windows on the front have rubbed brick heads. At the rear is a round-headed stair window.	II
Corner Farmhouse and water pump 53.33078°N 0.81232°W		Late 18th century	The farmhouse is in brick, with dentilled eaves, and a pantile roof with tumbled coped gables. There are two storeys and an L-shaped plan, with a front range of three bays and a rear wing. The central doorway has a fanlight, the windows are sashes, and all the openings have segmental heads. Outside is a lead pump with a wooden handle in a timber case.	II
Prebendary Farm House; 53.33145°N 0.81060°W	—	Late 18th century	The farmhouse is in brick with rebated eaves and a pantile roof. There are two storeys and attics, three bays, a lower service wing with two storeys and a single bay, and a continuous two-storey lean-to at the rear. The windows are a mix of sashes and casements, some with segmental heads.	II
North Leverton Windmill; 53.32946°N 0.83763°W		1813	The tower mill was raised in height in 1884. It is in tarred brick, and consists of a tapering circular tower with three stages, the top stage parallel, timber sails, and a fantail. It contains a doorway with a segmental head, above which are horizontally-sliding sash windows.	II*
Windmill Cottage; 53.32923°N 0.83787°W		1813	The cottage is in brick, partly whitewashed, with dentilled eaves and a pantile roof. There is a single storey, and an L-shaped plan, with a main range of three bays, a projecting bay on the left, and a lean-to on the right. The windows are a mix of casements and horizontally-sliding sashes, some with segmental heads.	II
Corner Farm House and farm buildings 53.33034°N 0.82260°W		Early 19th century	The farmhouse is in brick with a hipped slate roof, two storeys and three bays. The central round-headed doorway has a fanlight and an open pediment, and it is flanked by canted bay windows. Most of the other windows are sashes with segmental heads, and at the rear is a round-headed stair window. To the south of the house is a stable range with two storeys and three bays, a pigeoncote with two storeys, a single bay and a pyramidal roof, containing dentilled pigeon holes and shelves, a stable and granary with two storeys and two bays and external steps, and a threshing barn with two storeys and three bays.	II
Gainsborough House; 53.33045°N 0.82443°W		Early 19th century	The house is in brick with cogged eaves and a pantile roof. There are two storeys, three bays, and a continuous rear outshut. In the centre is a round-headed doorway with a fanlight, above it is a round-headed blocked recess, and the windows are sashes with segmental heads.	II
Rowan Tree Farmhouse and Stable; 53.33031°N 0.82353°W		Early 19th century	The farmhouse is in brick, with cogged eaves, and a pantile roof with coped tumbled gables. There are three storeys, an L-shaped plan, and a main range of two bays. In the centre is a latticed gabled timber porch, and the windows are horizontally-sliding sashes, those on the lower two floors with segmental heads. The adjoining stable block has a stone plinth, dentilled eaves, two storeys and two bays. The openings have segmental heads, and there are external stone steps.	II
Pigeoncote, Rowan Tree Farm; 53.33019°N 0.82338°W		Early 19th century	The pigeoncote is in brick and has a pantile roof with stepped coped gables. There are two storeys, a single bay, and a lean-to on the north side with cogged eaves. It contains doorways and casement windows with segmental heads, and pigeon holes.	II
The Farm; 53.33054°N 0.82312°W		Early 19th century	The house is in brick with cogged eaves and a pantile roof. There are two storeys and attics, and two bays. The central doorway and the windows, which are horizontally-sliding sashes with rubbed brick heads, have segmental heads.	II
Former Wesleyan Sunday School; 53.33126°N 0.82246°W		1838	The Sunday school, later converted for residential use, is in brick with dentilled eaves and a slate roof. There is a single storey and an L-shaped plan, with a front range of four bays, the right bay recessed, and a rear wing. The doorway and the casement windows on the front have four-centred arched heads, and in the rear wing is a mullioned and transomed window.	II
The Stables; 53.33031°N 0.81703°W		19th century	A cowhouse and a stable with a pigeoncote converted for residential use. They are in brick with dentilled eaves and pantile roofs. The cowhouse has a single storey and four bays, and contains a doorway and a hatch. The stable has two storeys and four bays, and contains a stable door with a segmental head and an opening with a rubbed brick head. In the right gable are three tiers of pigeon holes.	II
White Rose Cottage; 53.33031°N 0.82383°W		19th century	The cottage is in brick on a rendered plinth and has a pantile roof. There are two storeys and two bays, with the gable end facing the street. On the front are casement windows, elsewhere there are horizontally-sliding sashes, and all have segmental heads.	II
North Leverton War Memorial; 53.33075°N 0.81725°W		1921	The war memorial is in an enclosure by the roadside, and is in grey polished granite. It consists of an obelisk on a main plinth, on a squatter plinth, on a single step. On the south and west faces are inscriptions and the names of those lost in the two World Wars.	II
