= Listed buildings in Calverton, Nottinghamshire =

Calverton is a civil parish in the Gedling district of Nottinghamshire, England. The parish contains 17 listed buildings that are recorded in the National Heritage List for England. Of these, one is listed at Grade II*, the middle of the three grades, and the others are at Grade II, the lowest grade. The parish contains the village of Calverton and the surrounding countryside. Most of the listed buildings are houses and cottages, including former knitters' cottages. The other listed buildings include a church, a former hosiery factory and a war memorial, and, outside the village, two farmhouses and associated structures.

== Key ==
| Grade | Criteria |
|---|---|
| II* | Particularly important buildings of more than special interest |
| II | Buildings of national importance and special interest |

== Buildings ==
| Name and location | Photograph | Date | Notes | Grade |
|---|---|---|---|---|
| St Wilfrid's Church; 53.03640°N 1.08068°W | | Early 13th century | The church has been altered and extended through the centuries, in 1760–63 the nave and tower were rebuilt, the chancel was rebuilt in 1835, and the church was restored in 1881. The church is built in stone with roofs of lead, slate and tile, and consists of a nave, a south porch, a chancel, an organ chamber, a vestry and a west tower. The tower has a single stage, two buttresses, openings with Gibbs surrounds, and a clock face on the south side. On the west side is a doorway with a fanlight, above which is a datestone and a three-light window, and at the top is an embattled parapet. The nave also has an embattled parapet. | II* |
| Corner Cottage; 53.03625°N 1.08160°W | | Late 17th century | The house is in brick, partly rendered, on a rendered plinth, with cogged and rebated eaves, and a pantile roof with coped gables. There are two storeys and three bays. On the front is a lean-to porch, and the windows are casements, those in the ground floor with segmental heads. | II |
| 14 and 16 Main Street; 53.03592°N 1.07988°W | | Early 18th century | A house divided into two houses, it is in brick with rendered gables, on a rendered plinth, with cogged eaves, and a tile roof with shouldered coped gables. There are two storeys, three bays, a lower single-bay extension on the right, and a rear lean-to. On the front are two weatherboarded gabled porches, and the windows are casements, those in the ground floor with segmental heads. | II |
| Lodge Farmhouse and stables 53.04921°N 1.08758°W | | Early 18th century | The farmhouse is in brick, partly rendered, with a pantile roof. There are three storeys and an L-shaped plan, with a main range of three bays, a single-storey stable range to the left, and a rear lean-to. The central doorway has a moulded surround, and the windows in the lower two floors are sashes, the window above the doorway with a round-arched head and a keystone. In the top floor are three lunette windows. The stable range contains casement windows and doorways with segmental heads. | II |
| Weaver's Cottage; 53.03597°N 1.08165°W | — | Early 18th century | A house in whitewashed brick with a pantile roof and coped gables. There are two storeys and three bays, and a single-storey extension to the right. On the front is a lean-to porch, and the windows are casements. | II |
| 150 Main Street; 53.03810°N 1.09178°W | — | c. 1775 | A farmhouse, cartshed and stable combined into a private house, it is in brick with roofs of tile and slate. There are three storeys and an L-shaped plan with a front of three bays. In the centre of the south front is an elaborate wrought iron porch and a doorway with a fanlight and a stone hood on brackets. The windows are a mix of sashes with segmental heads and casements. On the east front is a porch and a doorway with a hood, and the openings include two altered cart openings, a blocked doorway and a stable door. | II |
| 18 Main Street; 53.03599°N 1.08011°W | | Late 18th century | A house and a cottage combined into one house, it is in brick with a pantile roof. There are two storeys, and an L-shaped plan with a front of three bays, and a later rear extension. On the front are two doorways with segmental heads, one in a gabled porch, and the windows are casements, those in the ground floor with segmental heads. | II |
| 135 Main Street; 53.03690°N 1.08675°W | | Late 18th century | The house is in whitewashed brick with cogged eaves and a pantile roof. There are two storeys, four bays, and a two-bay toilet block. The doorway has a brick hood. In the north gable end is a sash window with a segmental head, and the other windows are casements, those in the ground floor with segmental heads. | II |
| Museum Cottage; 53.03701°N 1.08425°W | | c. 1780 | The cottage, later a museum, is in brick on a stone plinth, with a pantile roof and coped gables. The doorway has a segmental head, and the windows are casements, some with shutters. | II |
| Hollinwood House and outbuilding 53.03599°N 1.10911°W | — | c. 1800 | The house is in brick, partly rendered, with a pantile roof, two storeys and attics. In the centre is a gabled porch, and the windows are sashes. Attached on the left is a single-storey outbuilding with a small casement window. | II |
| 22 Main Street; 53.03610°N 1.08030°W | — | Early 19th century | A house in whitewashed brick, it has cogged eaves, and a pantile roof with coped gables. There are two storeys and an L-shaped plan, with a front range of three bays and rear extensions. On the front is a gabled porch, and the windows are horizontally-sliding sashes, those in the ground floor with segmental heads. | II |
| Calverton House; 53.03581°N 1.07918°W | | Early 19th century | A vicarage, later a private house, in rendered brick on a chamfered plinth, with corbelled eaves, and a roof partly hipped in slate and partly gabled in pantile. There are two storeys and an L-shaped plan. The main block has a front of six bays, and sides of two bays, and there is a rear service wing. The doorway in the west front is recessed and round-headed, and has a rebated surround and a fanlight. The windows in the main block are sashes, and in the service wing are casements and a horizontally-sliding sash. | II |
| Church View; 53.03582°N 1.08088°W | — | Early 19th century | The house is in whitewashed brick with rebated eaves and a pantile roof. There are two storeys, three bays and a rear extension. On the front is a gabled porch, and the windows are casements. | II |
| Former printing works 53.03757°N 1.09073°W | | c. 1830 | Originally a hosiery factory and at one time a printing works, the building is in brick with gabled and hipped pantile roofs. There are two storeys and five bays. The windows are a mix of sashes and casements, those in the ground floor with segmental heads. | II |
| Windles Square; 53.03577°N 1.07603°W | | 1834 | Two rows of knitters' cottages at right angles, later eight houses, in brick, partly rendered, with corbelled eaves and pantile roofs. There are two storeys, and each row has ten bays. In the ground floor are small lights, doorways with segmental heads, and knitters' windows with segmental heads. The upper floor contains casement windows. | II |
| 221 and 225 Main Street; 53.03794°N 1.09250°W | | 1857 | Three knitters' cottages, later two houses, they are in brick with cogged eaves and a pantile roof. There are two storeys and six bays, and a single-storey extension to the left. In the ground floor are small windows and large knitters' windows with segmental heads, and the upper floor contains casement windows. In the north gable end are initials and the date in burnt brick headers. | II |
| War memorial 53.04098°N 1.08260°W | — | c. 1920 | The war memorial is in Calverton Cemetery. It is in granite, and consists of a wheel-head cross on a tapering plinth on a base of three steps, and is about 3.5 metres (11 ft) high. There are inscriptions on the shaft, on the four sides of the plinth and on the front face of the steps. On the other faces of the steps are the names of those lost in the two World Wars. The monument is in a square enclosure surrounded by a low wall with an iron post and a chain link fence. | II |
