= Abigail Gawthern =

British diarist and lead manufacturer

- Born: Abigail Frost; 7 July 1757; Probably in Nottingham
- Died: 7 January 1822 (aged 64); Low Pavement, Nottingham
- Resting place: St Mary's Church, Nottingham
- Known for: her diary
- Spouse: Francis Gawthern (1783-1791, his death)
- Children: 4
- Parents: Thomas Frost (father); Ann Abson (mother)
- Relatives: Thomas Secker, great-uncle

Abigail Anna Gawthern (née Frost; 7 July 1757 – 7 January 1822) was a British diarist and lead manufacturer.

== Early life ==
Gawthern was probably born in Nottingham. Her parents were Ann Frost née Abson and Thomas Frost; they had eight children but Abigail was the only one to survive them. She was sent to a boarding school for a few years.

She was named "Abigail Anna" after her father's mother. This was opportune as the Frosts were to inherit a substantial bequest from her grandmother's brother Thomas Secker, the Archbishop of Canterbury. After Secker died his will was disputed by Thomas Frost, and he managed to persuade the court that £11,000 intended for charity should be added to an existing legitimate bequest to his family.

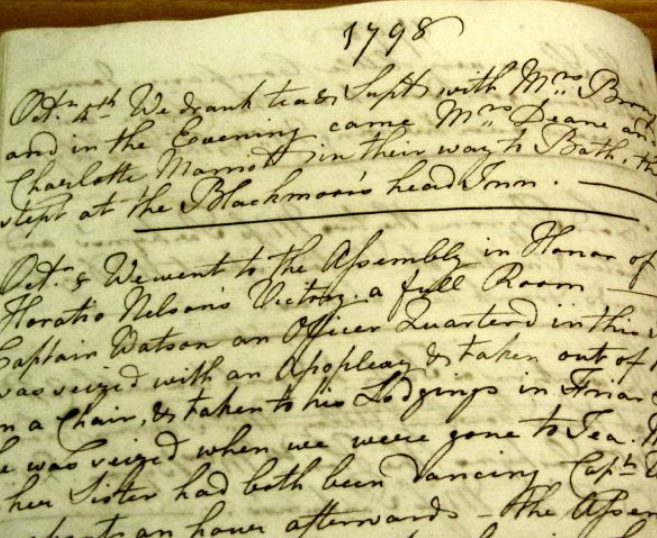
Abigail Gawthern's diary for 1798

== Marriage ==
Gawthern married her cousin Francis Gawthern in 1783. They had four children, but only two, Francis and Anna, survived.

== Career ==
In 1791, Francis Gawthern died. She took control of the family's white lead business and its money and property. She continued to live in their substantial house at 26 Low Pavement in Nottingham. When her parents died in 1801, she received another large inheritance. The business continued, and her son Francis briefly led the business until it folded in 1808 due to the development of more efficient production methods.

== Death ==
Gawthern died in her Nottingham home in 1822. She was survived by her son Francis and daughter Anna. She was buried in St Mary's Church, Nottingham.

== Diary ==
Gawthern is remembered because in the early 1800s she copied her diaries into a single volume that, in time, would document Nottingham's history for the period 1751–1810. The diaries are exemplative of how the professional classes lived at that time.

She started keeping a diary from an early age.

Her diary was a "retrospective chronicle of personal, family and local event" compiled between 1808 and 1813 according to the editor of the print version.
