= St Wilfrid's Church, Calverton =

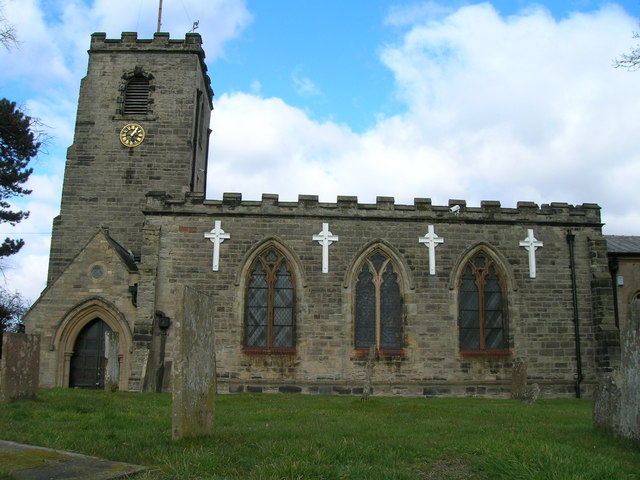
- St Wilfrid's Church, Calverton
- St Wilfrid's Church, Calverton
- 53°2′10.83″N 1°4′50.53″W
- OS grid reference: SK 61740 49184
- Location: Calverton, Nottinghamshire
- Country: England
- Denomination: Church of England

History
- Dedication: St Wilfrid

Architecture
- Heritage designation: Grade II* listed

Administration
- Diocese: Diocese of Southwell and Nottingham
- Archdeaconry: Newark
- Deanery: Newark and Southwell
- Parish: Calverton

St Wilfrid's Church is a Grade II* listed parish church in the Church of England in Calverton, Nottinghamshire.

== History ==
St Wilfrid’s church seems to date, for the most part, from the fourteenth century, when it may have been reconstructed with material from an older building.

The nave and tower were rebuilt in 1760-3 and over the west door is a commemorative stone ‘ Mr. Pugh, Vicar, Saml. Pugh, Ino.Barrett, Church Wardens, Wm.Barrett, mason’. In 1835 the chancel was reconstructed and in 1881 the whole church was restored.

An organ chamber was built in 1888 and an annexe in 1962.

The nave has the somewhat unusual form of a wide parallelogram 42 feet 8 inches long and 37 feet 2 inches wide, of one span and with no traces of any arcades. The chancel arch is not in the centre of the east wall of the nave, but about five feet nearer to the north side. This has led to the suggestion that when the building was rebuilt in the 1760s, the south wall of the nave was moved further south to enlarge the building.

On the west wall of the ringing chamber, at second storey level, is a sandstone carving, on its side, of a man apparently digging, while on the west wall of the clock chamber, at third storey level, is a collection of nine sandstone panels believed to represent the occupations of the seasons. Seven of these stones are voussoir-shaped, and may have formed part of a band of ornament nine inches wide on the architrave of an arch in the earlier pre-fourteenth century building. Similar depictions of country activities may be seen on the fonts at Burnham Deepdale in Norfolk, and Brookland in Kent.

Carved into the capital of the north jamb is a small, 3” by 4”, panel containing a three-quarter length depiction of a bearded bishop together with another figure. It is perhaps St Wilfrid himself, either with a newly baptised convert or, as the freeing of slaves was a distinguishing feature of the bishop's career, in the act of manumission.

== Organ ==
The organ is by Brindley & Foster dating from 1880. A specification of the organ can be found on the National Pipe Organ Register.

== See also ==
- Grade II* listed buildings in Nottinghamshire
- Listed buildings in Calverton, Nottinghamshire
