= Coates, Nottinghamshire =

Coordinates: 53.32°N 0.77°W

Coates
- Location within Nottinghamshire
- OS grid reference: SK820813
- Civil parish: North Leverton with Habblesthorpe
- District: Bassetlaw
- Shire county: Nottinghamshire
- Region: East Midlands
- Country: England
- Sovereign state: United Kingdom
- Post town: RETFORD
- Postcode district: DN22
- Police: Nottinghamshire
- Fire: Nottinghamshire
- Ambulance: East Midlands
- UK Parliament: Bassetlaw

Coates is a hamlet in Nottinghamshire, England. It is located 8 miles south of Gainsborough. on the west bank of the River Trent. The hamlet is within the North Leverton with Habblesthorpe civil parish.
