= Sheriff House =

Listed building in Nottingham, England

Coordinates: 52°57′12″N 1°9′25″W

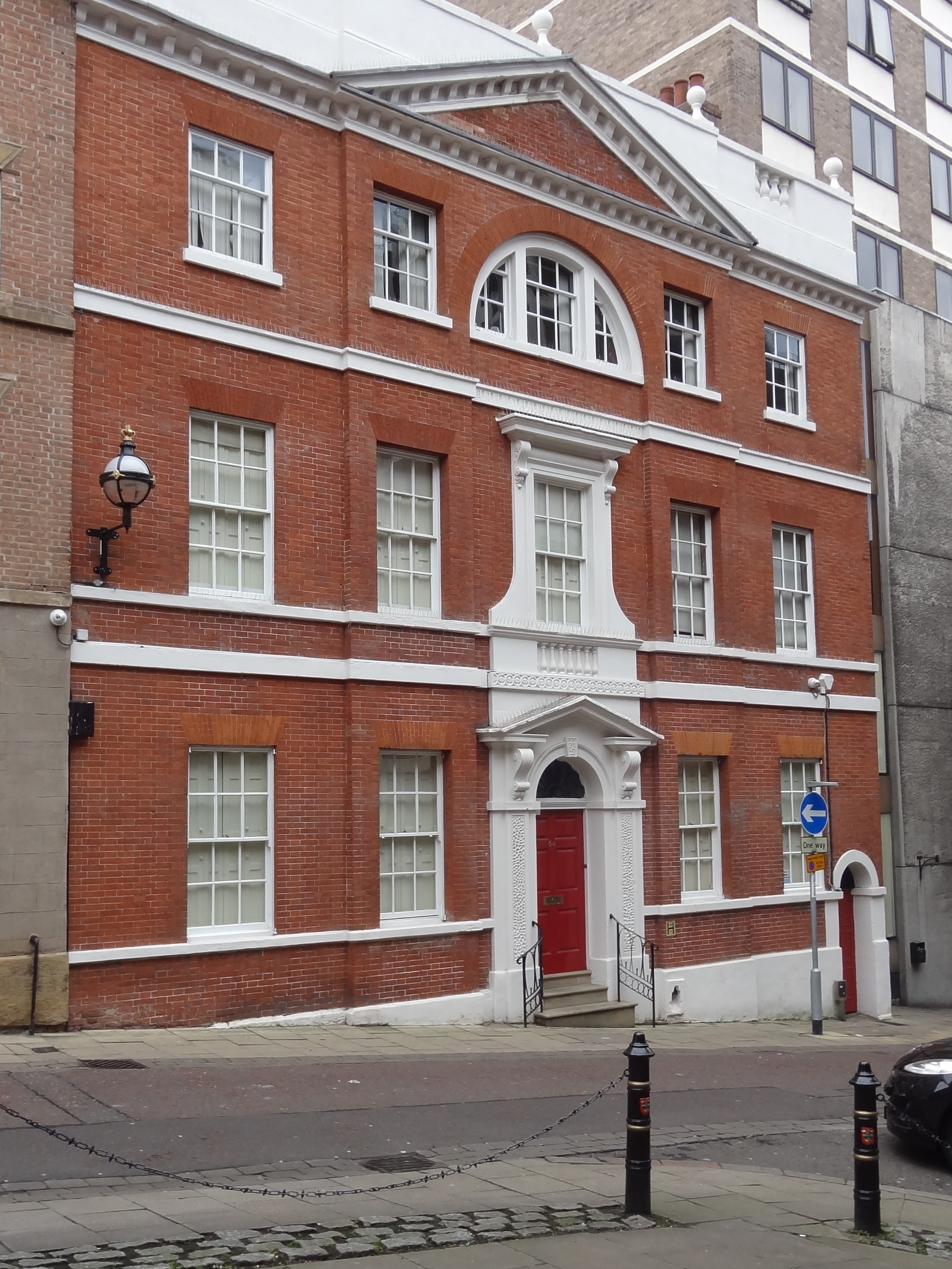
- Sheriff House, 64 St James’ Street, Nottingham

- Location in central Nottingham

General information
- Location: 64 St James' Street, Nottingham, England
- Completed: 1767
- Client: Cornelius Launder

Listed Building – Grade II*
- Official name: Sheriff House
- Designated: 11 August 1952
- Reference no.: 1270499

Sheriff House is a Grade II* listed building on St James' Street in Nottingham, England. Originally built for the Sheriff of Nottingham, Sheriff House is now a vibrant offices and co-working space.

== History ==
The house was built for Cornelius Lander. The date of construction was recorded on a date-stone inscribed 'C1767L' but this is no longer extant. Cornelius Launder, Sheriff of Nottingham in 1775, was a notable landlord and had a reputation as a miser, but spared no expense on his own house and lived here until his death in 1806. The building shows similarities to 41 Friar Gate in Derby which dates from 1771 so there is a suggestion that the architect of Sheriff House was Joseph Pickford of Derby. The building had no rear garden, but possessed a garden on the opposite side of the street.

The building was sold after 1908 and became the headquarters of the Medico-Chirurgical Society who were resident until 1956. It was designated a Grade II* listed building in 1952. In 1990 it was put up for sale. It was restored by Nicholas Forman Hardy with Gervase Jackson-Stops in 1995. Later converted to office space, the building was sold to a property investor in January 2025.

== See also ==
- Grade II* listed buildings in Nottinghamshire
- Listed buildings in Nottingham (Radford and Park ward)
