= St Giles' Church, Edingley =

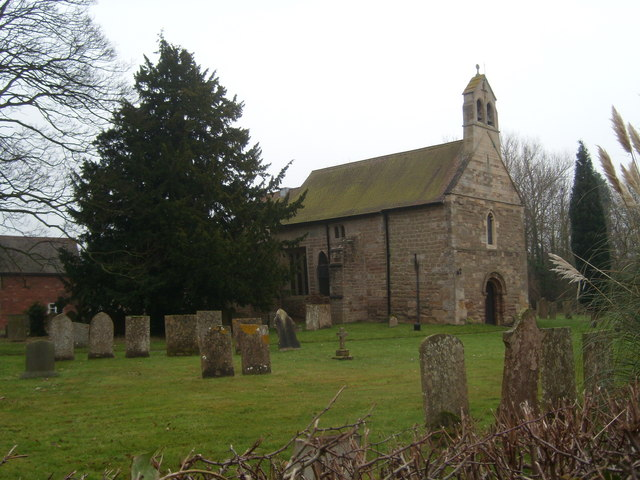
- St Giles' Church, Edingley
- St Giles' Church, Edingley
- 53°5′44.26″N 1°0′27.97″W
- OS grid reference: SK 66508 55862
- Location: Edingley
- Country: England
- Denomination: Church of England

History
- Dedication: St Giles

Architecture
- Heritage designation: Grade II* listed

Administration
- Diocese: Diocese of Southwell and Nottingham
- Archdeaconry: Newark
- Deanery: Newark and Southwell
- Parish: Edingley

St Giles' Church, Edingley is a Grade II* listed parish church in the Church of England in Edingley.

== History ==
This is a small church dating from the 12th century, with no tower and a bellcote. The north wall comprises a number of windows from different periods, including a narrow Norman one. The church underwent extensive repairs and restoration during the 19th century. The chancel was rebuilt by Henry Machon in 1844 and the church was restored around 1890 by Charles Hodgson Fowler.

The church is in a joint parish with St Michael the Archangel's Church, Halam.

A pair of headstones in the churchyard from the late 17th century are separately Grade II listed.

== See also ==
- Grade II* listed buildings in Nottinghamshire
- Listed buildings in Edingley
