= Sloswicke's Hospital =

Listed building in Nottinghamshire, England

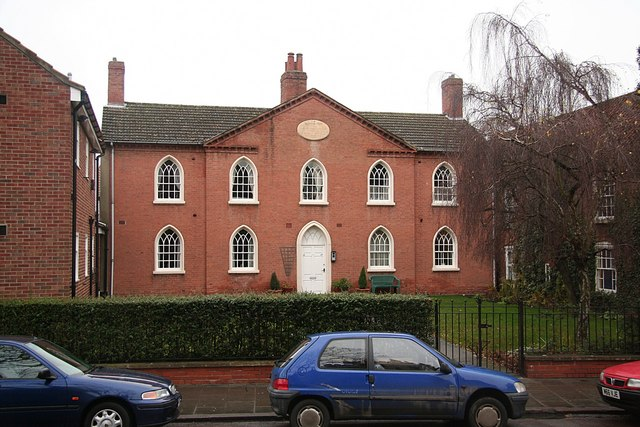

- Location within Nottinghamshire

General information
- Type: Country house
- Location: East Retford, Nottinghamshire, England
- Coordinates: 53°19′27.81″N 0°56′29.62″W
- Year built: 1657
- Renovated: 1806 (rebuilt)
- Client: Richard Sloswicke

Listed Building – Grade II*
- Official name: Sloswicke's Hospital Almshouses
- Designated: 5 November 1976
- Reference no.: 1302341

Sloswicke's Hospital is a Grade II* listed almshouse in East Retford, Nottinghamshire, England.

== History ==
Richard Sloswicke's will left money to found almshouses "for the maintenance of six poore old men of good carriage and behaviour to the end of the world" in 1657. The present building dates from 1806; an additional pair of houses was added in 1819, behind the 1806 building. A further modern block containing four self-contained flats was built to the left of the 1806 building in the 1980s and the Sloswick's Trust also owns several other properties around East Retford, including a row of terraced houses on Queen Street and Hawksley House on Coronation Street, all used for the housing of old people from or with a connection to East Retford.

It was designated a Grade II* listed building in 1976.

Sloswicke's Almshouse Charity (229556) maintains the properties to the current day.

== See also ==
- Grade II* listed buildings in Nottinghamshire
- Listed buildings in Retford
