= Brangwyn Hall =

Concert venue in Wales

- Welsh: Neuadd y Brangwyn
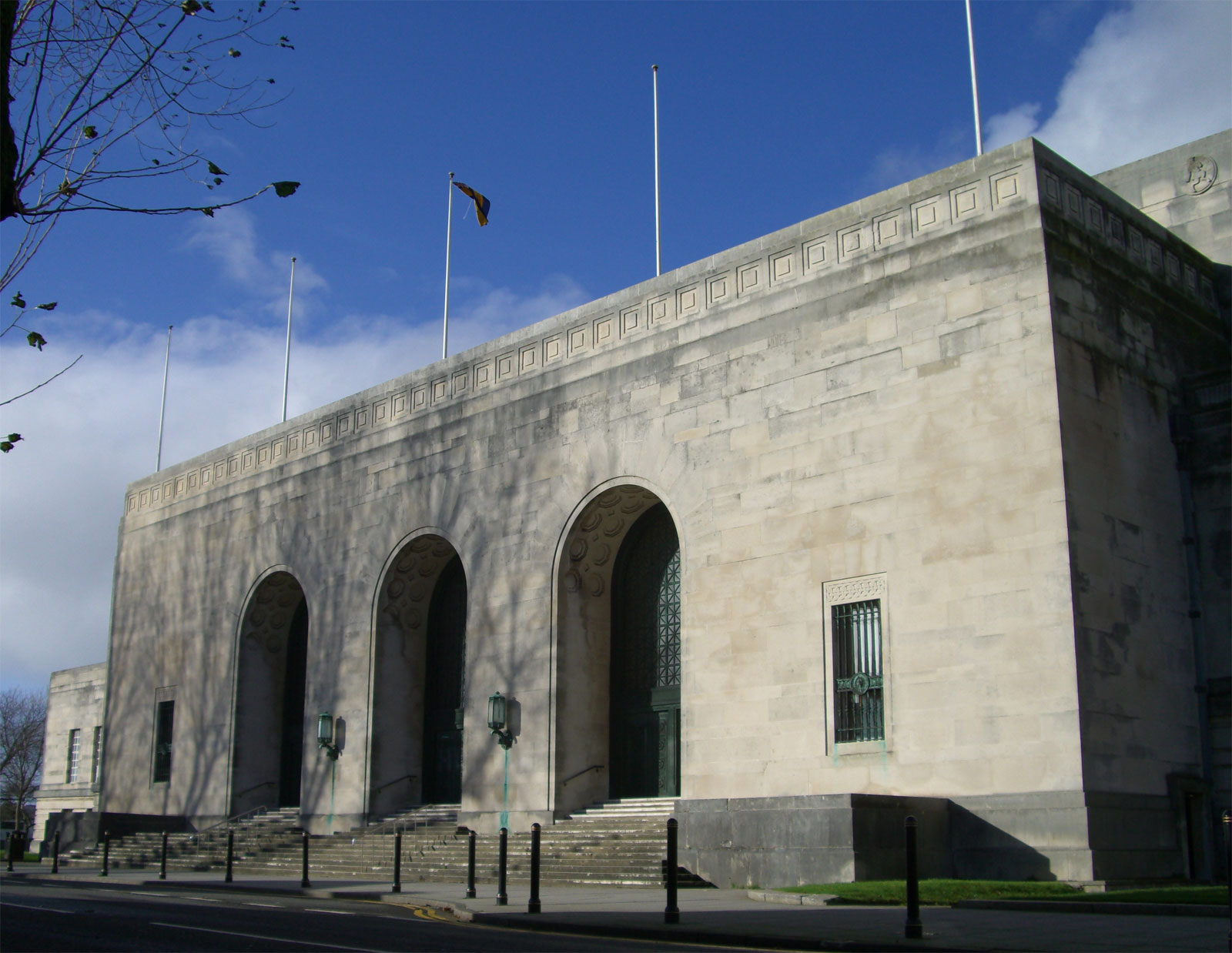
- Brangwyn Hall entrance
- Interactive map of the Brangwyn Hall area

General information
- Location: Swansea, Wales, United Kingdom, Guildhall, Swansea SA1 4PE
- Coordinates: 51°36′50″N 3°57′36″W
- Inaugurated: 23 October 1934
- Owner: Swansea City Council

The Brangwyn Hall (Welsh: Neuadd y Brangwyn) is a concert venue in Swansea. It is named after the artist Frank Brangwyn, whose British Empire Panels, originally intended for the House of Lords, are displayed there.

== History ==
The Brangwyn Hall was designed and built as part of the Swansea Guildhall in 1934 but, before the British Empire Panels could be installed, the ceiling of the hall had to be raised in order to show them off.

The British Empire Panels are sixteen large paintings by Frank Brangwyn which were commissioned in 1924 for the Royal Gallery of the House of Lords, to commemorate the First World War. Brangwyn had worked as an official war artist, and was selected by the sponsor Lord Iveagh, an Irish peer. He chose to create a "decorative painting representing various Dominions and parts of the British Empire", and five finished panels were displayed in 1930. The work was completed in 1932, but, after some sections of the media argued that the panels were too colourful and spirited, the House of Lords declined them. So Swansea Council acquired them instead.

== Organ ==
The pipe organ (Welsh: Organ Neuadd y Brangwyn) has four manuals. It was designed by Henry Willis & Sons, and was originally built in 1921 for the Elite Picture Theatre, Nottingham. It was relocated in October 1934.

== Description ==
The Brangwyn Hall is used for awards ceremonies and social events as well as classical music concerts and rock concerts. Among the ceremonies held at the Brangwyn Hall are the annual Chinese New Year celebrations (for the Chinese community in Swansea). The graduation ceremonies for students graduating from University of Wales Trinity Saint David were also held there, before they moved to the newly built Swansea Arena, and then reverted to the hall in July 2025. Swansea University uses Brangwyn Hall as an external examination venue. The BBC National Orchestra of Wales frequently uses this venue when performing in Swansea.

Additionally, the BBC has filmed some scenes from the Doctor Who episodes "Silence in the Library" and "Forest of the Dead", as well as "The Big Bang". The hall was also used as a filming location for the 2019 Channel 4 miniseries The Accident.

Views of Brangwyn Hall
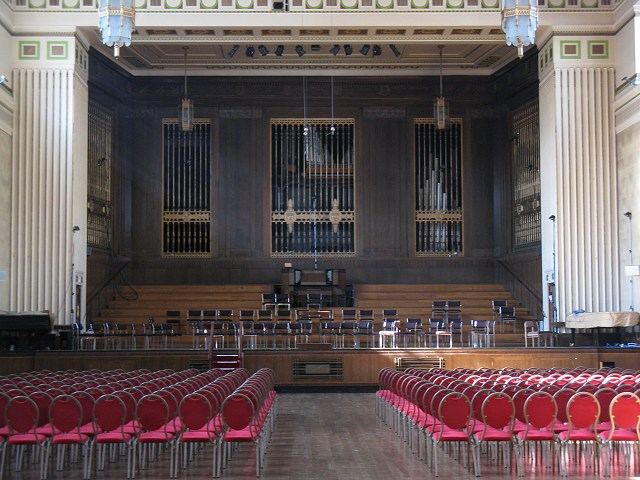
The stage with its built-in pipe organ

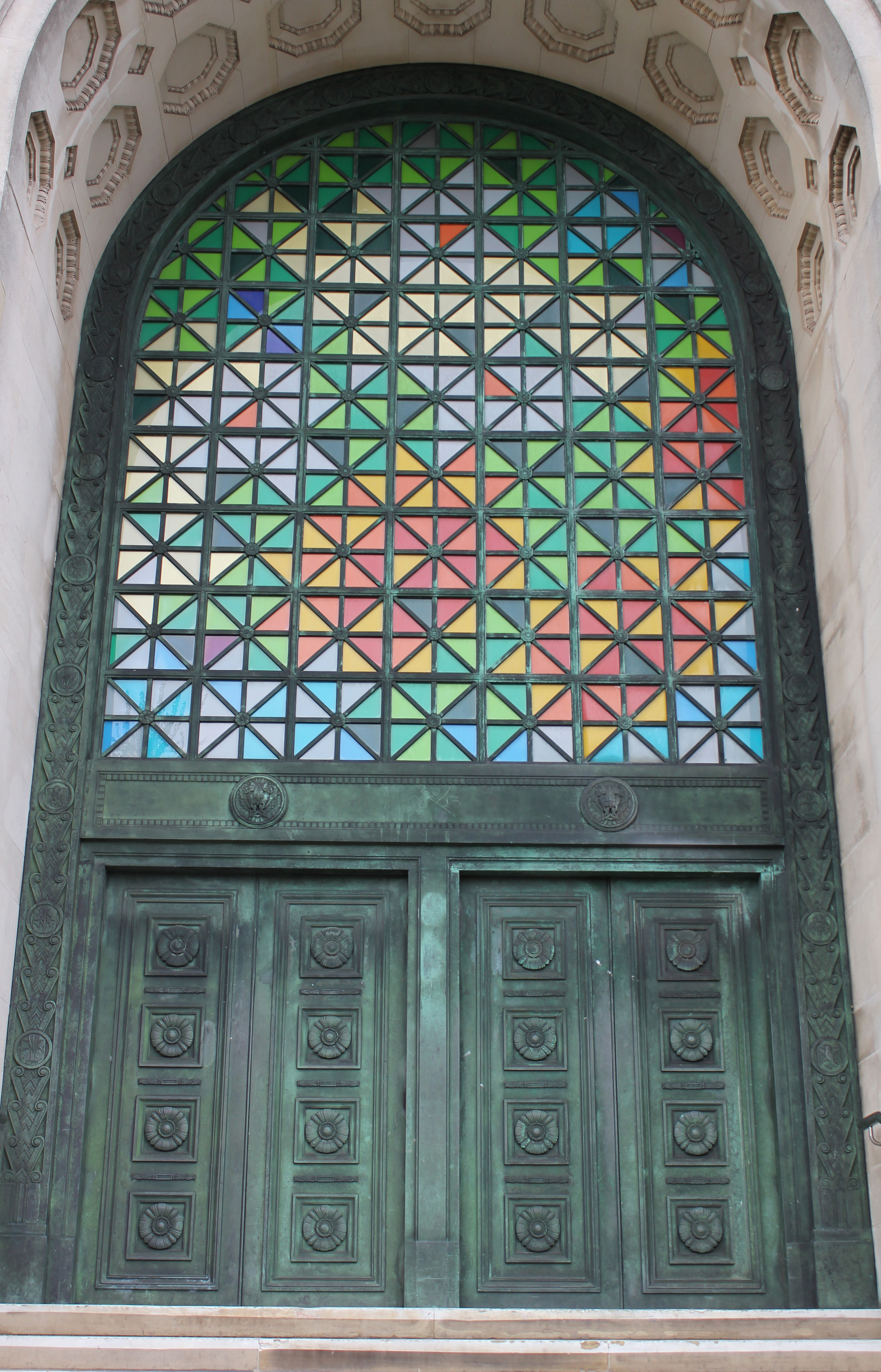
Brangwyn Hall external door and window
