= Halam, Nottinghamshire =

Village and civil parish in Nottinghamshire, England

Coordinates: 53.083°N 0.988°W

Halam
- Village and civil parish
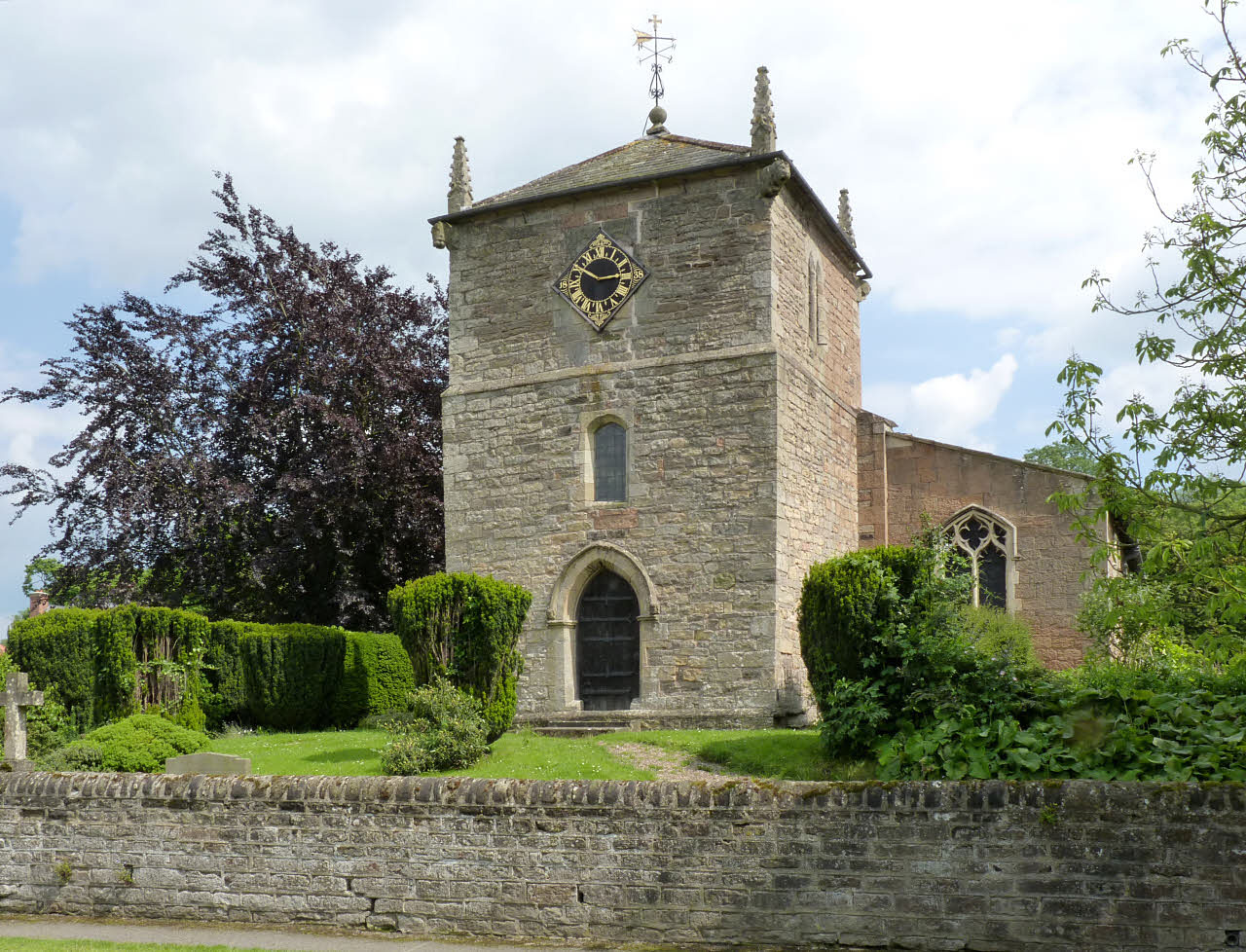
- Church of St Michael, Halam

- Location within Nottinghamshire
- Interactive map of Halam
- Area: 2.53 sq mi (6.6 km^{2})
- Population: 387 (2021)
  - Density: 153/sq mi (59/km^{2})
- OS grid reference: SK 677544
  - London: 115 mi (185 km) SSE
- District: Newark and Sherwood
- Shire county: Nottinghamshire
- Region: East Midlands
- Country: England
- Sovereign state: United Kingdom
- Post town: NEWARK
- Postcode district: NG22
- Dialling code: 01636
- Police: Nottinghamshire
- Fire: Nottinghamshire
- Ambulance: East Midlands
- UK Parliament: Sherwood
- Website: www.hugofox.com/community/halam-nottinghamshire-10418/home

Halam is a village and civil parish in the Newark and Sherwood district of Nottinghamshire, England, with a population of 372 in 2001, increasing to 426 at the 2011 census, and 387 at the 2021 census. It is located to the west of Southwell.

The parish church, built in the 11th–12th centuries, is dedicated to St Michael the Archangel. At the north end of the village stands an 18th-century water mill, three storeys high with a lean-to wheelhouse and an adjoining cottage. The village also has a public house, the Waggon & Horses, which is the first carbon-neutral pub in the United Kingdom and home of the Nottinghamshire Pie, a dish created by chef Roy Wood. The local school is Halam Church of England Primary School.

== Notable people ==
- Peter Glazebrook, vegetable grower
- Robert Macfarlane (born 1976), travel writer and academic

== See also ==
- Listed buildings in Halam, Nottinghamshire
