= North Leverton with Habblesthorpe =

Coordinates: 53.329°N 0.822°W

- Village and civil parish
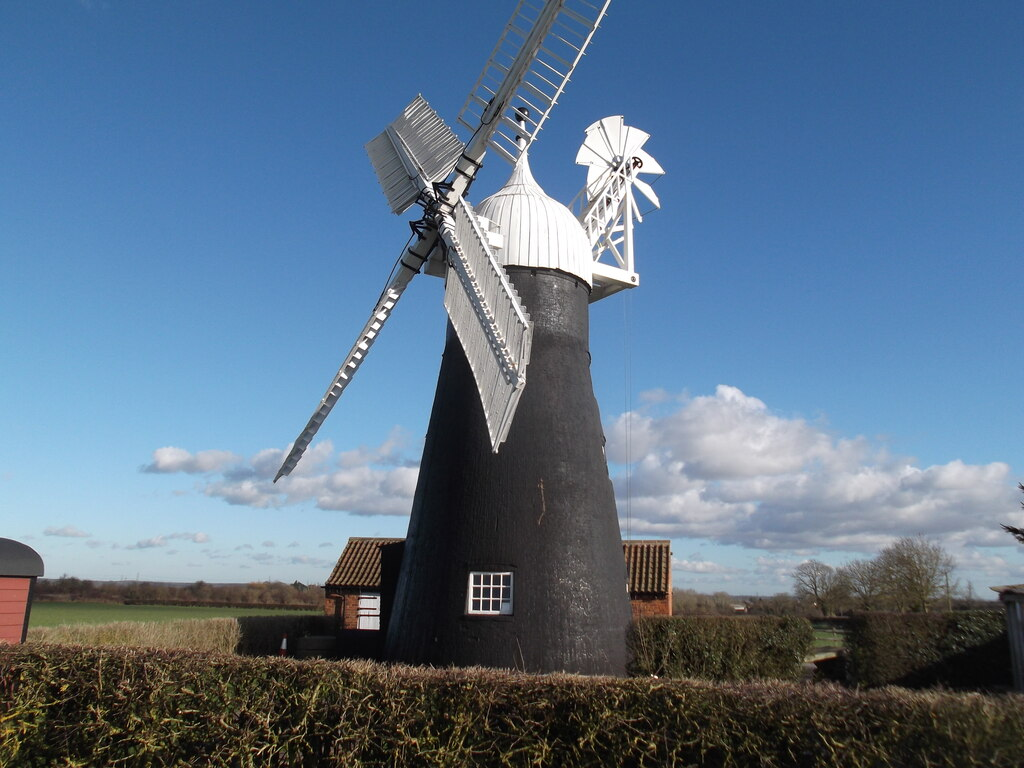
- North Leverton Windmill

- Location within Nottinghamshire
- Interactive map of North Leverton with Habblesthorpe
- Area: 3.78 sq mi (9.8 km^{2})
- Population: 1,079 (2021)
  - Density: 285/sq mi (110/km^{2})
- OS grid reference: SK 785821
  - London: 130 mi (210 km) SSE
- Civil parish: North Leverton with Habblesthorpe
- District: Bassetlaw
- Shire county: Nottinghamshire
- Region: East Midlands
- Country: England
- Sovereign state: United Kingdom
- Settlements: North Leverton with Habblesthorpe, Coates
- Post town: RETFORD
- Postcode district: DN22
- Dialling code: 01427
- Police: Nottinghamshire
- Fire: Nottinghamshire
- Ambulance: East Midlands
- UK Parliament: Bassetlaw
- Website: www.northlevertonwithhabblesthorpeparishcouncil.gov.uk

North Leverton with Habblesthorpe is a village and civil parish in the Bassetlaw district, in the county of Nottinghamshire, England. It is about 5 miles or 8 km (5.0 mi) east of Retford. The population (including the hamlet of Coates) as at the 2011 Census was 1,047, and in the 2021–22 Census it had increased to 1,079.

Unlike other civil parishes with a name of the form "X with Y", North Leverton with Habblesthorpe is shown as a village name on Ordnance Survey maps. It thus has the longest name of a village in England and the second longest in Europe, behind Llanfairpwll in Wales. These were considered separate parishes and settlements until 1884, when a process to merge the two was completed.

The village has a primary school, a parish church, a small village store/post office, and a pub, the Royal Oak.

== North Leverton Windmill ==
The village has a working windmill, which was built in 1813 and is a Grade II* listed building. The windmill is open every Saturday, and sells wholemeal, spelt, white flour, oats and souvenirs.

== St Martin's Church ==
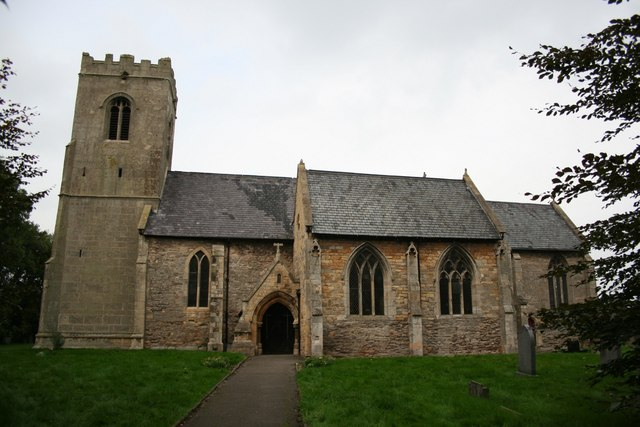
St Martin's Church, North Leverton

The parish church of St Martin is medieval, the oldest part being the south doorway of circa 1200. The church was built in the Norman period, circa 1200. The ornate window tracery of the south aisle and the chancel, dating from around 1300–40, is the chief feature of interest. The west tower is Perpendicular.

The church was restored in 1878.

== Habblesthorpe ==
Habblesthorpe now survives largely as an overgrown churchyard with a small number of gravestones. Between 1613 and 1623 it was known as a place couples could resort to for a clandestine marriage.

Habblesthorpe Manor is a small early 17th century brick-built house. It is a Grade II listed building.

== See also ==
- Listed buildings in North Leverton with Habblesthorpe
