= Edingley =

Village and civil parish in Nottinghamshire, England

Coordinates: 53.09°N 1.00°W

- Village and civil parish
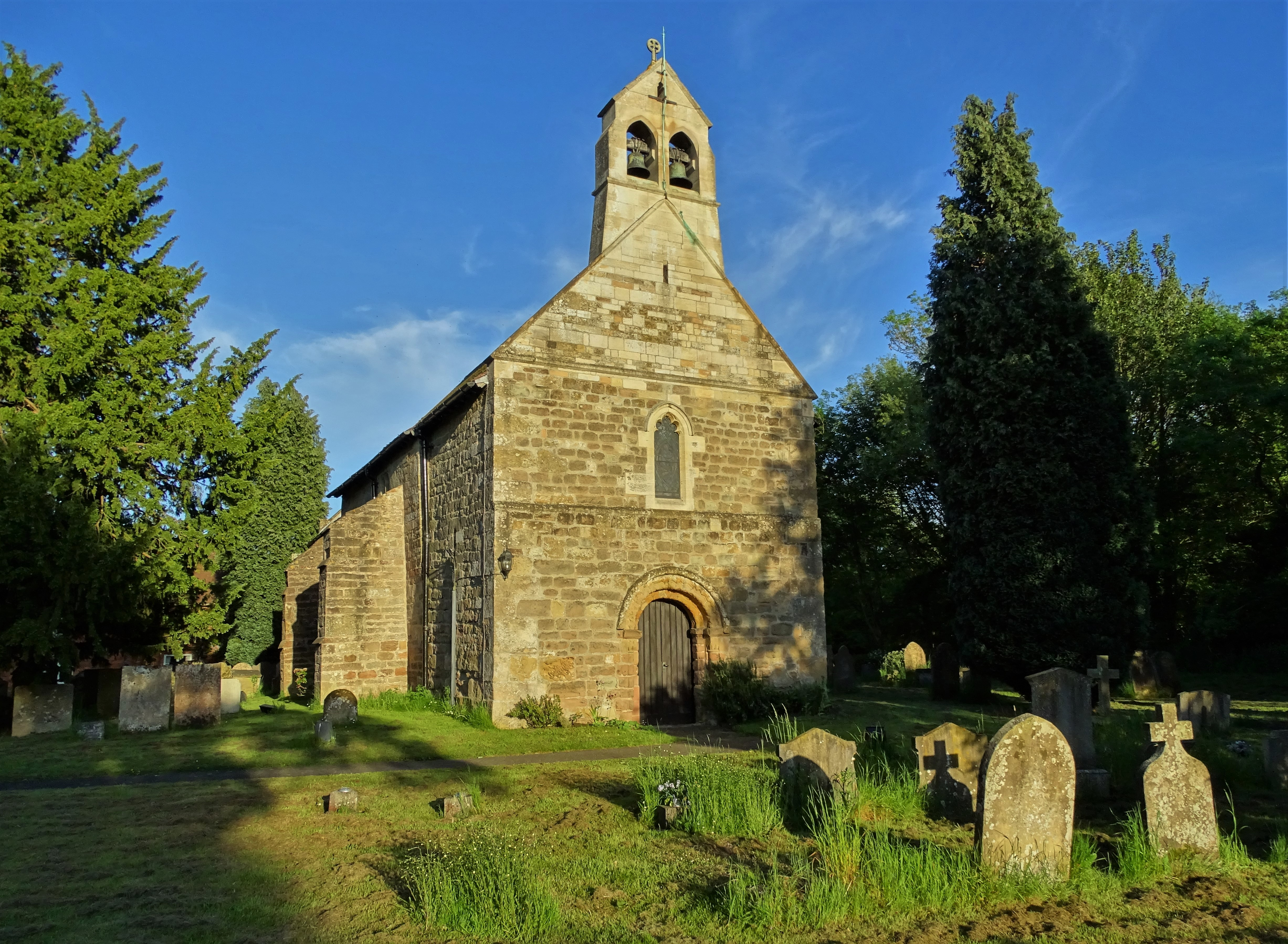
- Church of St Giles, Edingley

- Location within Nottinghamshire
- Interactive map of Edingley
- Area: 2.74 sq mi (7.1 km^{2})
- Population: 401 (2021)
  - Density: 146/sq mi (56/km^{2})
- OS grid reference: SK 666557
  - London: 115 mi (185 km) SSE
- District: Newark and Sherwood
- Shire county: Nottinghamshire
- Region: East Midlands
- Country: England
- Sovereign state: United Kingdom
- Post town: NEWARK
- Postcode district: NG22
- Dialling code: 01623
- Police: Nottinghamshire
- Fire: Nottinghamshire
- Ambulance: East Midlands
- UK Parliament: Sherwood
- Website: www.edingley.org.uk

Edingley is a village in the Newark and Sherwood district of Nottinghamshire, England. According to the 2001 census it had a population of 390, increasing to 443 at the 2011 census, and falling to 401 at the 2021 census. It is located 3 miles north-west of Southwell.

The name Edingley contains the Old English personal name, Eddi, + lēah (Old English), a forest, wood, glade, clearing; (later) a pasture, meadow.'...so 'Eddi's wood/clearing'.

The parish church of St Giles is Norman, almost completely rebuilt in 1890. It is a largely agricultural parish with a public house, The Old Reindeer, and a residential home, Edingley Lodge (formerly Highfields). Its allotments are historic and the plot originally held the poor house and is the same plot as in the enclosure award of 1781 made under the Halam and Edingley Inclosure Act 1777 (17 Geo. 3. c. 117 Pr.) and formally surveyed in 1899.

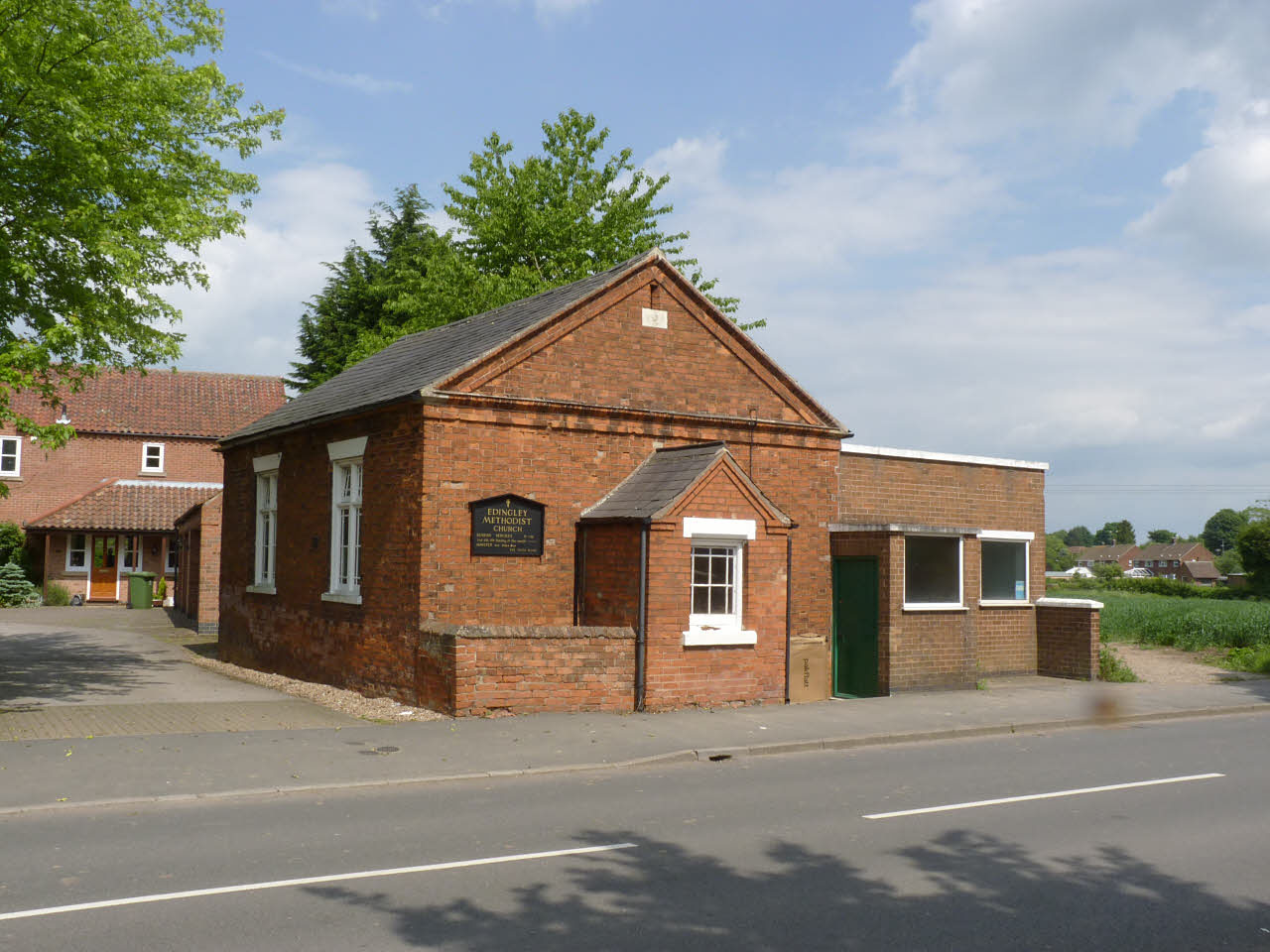
Former Methodist Chapel

The former Methodist chapel, built in 1838, was part of the Newark and Southwell Methodist Circuit and closed in 2014 due to dwindling attendance. The incumbent minister commented "The village has changed out of all recognition since the chapel was built" and "It has completed its mission...".

The village school was built in 1911–12 and closed in the 1960s. The private Edgehill school took over the building and extended northwards with a series of temporary buildings, closing in 1996. The main building, known as the Old Schoolroom, is now the village community hall.

== See also ==
- Listed buildings in Edingley
