= Cossall =

Village and civil in Nottinghamshire, England

Coordinates: 52.976°N 1.281°W

- Village and civil parish
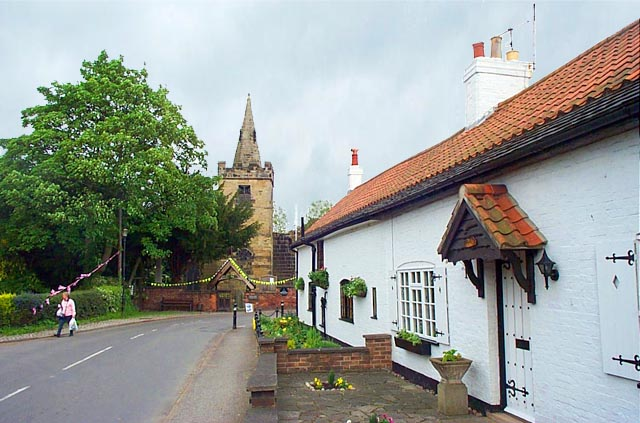
- View towards St Catherine's Church, Cossall

- Location within Nottinghamshire
- Interactive map of Cossall
- Area: 2.07 sq mi (5.4 km^{2})
- Population: 562 (2021 Census)
  - Density: 271/sq mi (105/km^{2})
- OS grid reference: SK 4842
  - London: 110 mi (180 km) SSE
- District: Borough of Broxtowe
- Shire county: Nottinghamshire
- Region: East Midlands
- Country: England
- Sovereign state: United Kingdom
- Settlements: Cossall; Cossall Marsh
- Post town: Nottingham
- Postcode district: NG16
- Dialling code: 0115
- Police: Nottinghamshire
- Fire: Nottinghamshire
- Ambulance: East Midlands
- UK Parliament: Broxtowe
- Website: Cossall Parish Council

Cossall /kɒʃəl/ is a village and civil parish 1 mile (1.6 km) east of Ilkeston in Nottinghamshire, England. The 2001 census recorded a parish population of 612, reducing slightly to 606 at the 2011 census, and further to 562 at the 2021 census. There is also a ward of Broxtowe Council called Cossall and Kimberley. The population is listed under Kimberley. North of the hamlet is a slag heap formed of tons of waste extracted from local coal mines.

== See also ==
- Listed buildings in Cossall
