= St Matthew's Church, Normanton-upon-Trent =

St Matthew's Church, Normanton-on-Trent
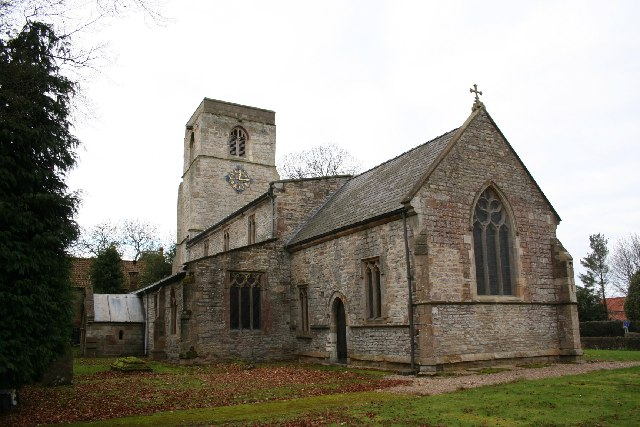
- St Matthew's Church, Normanton-on-Trent
- St Matthew's Church, Normanton-on-Trent
- 53°12′43.92″N 0°49′6.58″W
- OS grid reference: SK 79070 69009
- Location: Normanton on Trent
- Country: England
- Denomination: Church of England

History
- Dedication: St Matthew

Architecture
- Heritage designation: Grade II* listed

Administration
- Diocese: Diocese of Southwell and Nottingham
- Archdeaconry: Newark
- Deanery: Newark and Southwell
- Parish: Normanton-on-Trent

St Matthew's Church, Normanton-on-Trent is a Grade II* listed parish church in the Church of England in Normanton on Trent.

== History ==
The church dates from the 13th century.

It is part of a joint parish with:

- St Mary's Church, Carlton-on-Trent
- All Saints' Church, Sutton-on-Trent

== See also ==
- Grade II* listed buildings in Nottinghamshire
- Listed buildings in Normanton on Trent
