= All Saints' Church, Sutton-on-Trent =

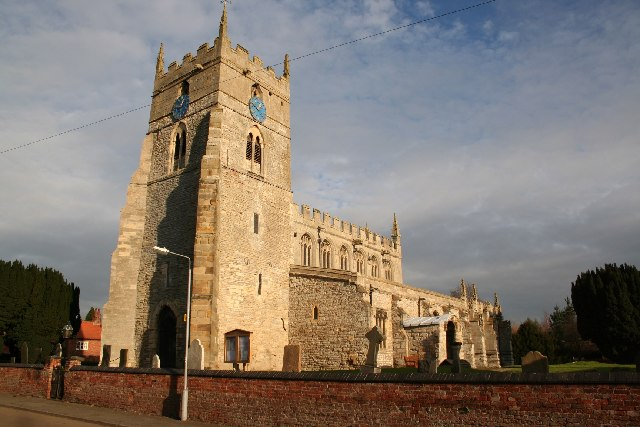
- All Saints' Church, Sutton-on-Trent
- All Saints' Church, Sutton-on-Trent
- 53°11′3.4″N 0°48′10.9″W
- OS grid reference: SK 80067 65949
- Location: Sutton-on-Trent
- Country: England
- Denomination: Church of England

History
- Dedication: All Saints'

Architecture
- Heritage designation: Grade I listed

Administration
- Diocese: Diocese of Southwell and Nottingham
- Archdeaconry: Newark
- Deanery: Newark and Southwell
- Parish: Sutton-on-Trent

All Saints' Church, Sutton-on-Trent is a Grade I listed parish church in the Church of England in Sutton-on-Trent.

== History ==
A Saxon church was listed in the Domesday Book of 1086, but was replaced by the current Norman building. The tower contains Saxon foundations and Norman herringbone work; the upper stages are 13th and early 14th century respectively. The Mering Chapel was built around 1525.

The current, Grade I listed church is dedicated to All Saints. It can hold 350 persons and was repaired in 1848 and again in 1902-03. All the grave stones in the churchyard were moved to the edges some years ago and the graveyard was levelled.

The tower was rebuilt in the 1902-1903 renovations, and restored in 1932 by William Weir. The tower was further restored in 1956-1968.

It is part of a joint parish with:

- St Matthew's Church, Normanton-upon-Trent
- St Mary's Church, Carlton-on-Trent

== Organ ==
The church contains an organ dating from 1911 by Henry Speechly. A specification of the organ can be found on the National Pipe Organ Register.

== See also ==
- Grade I listed buildings in Nottinghamshire
- Listed buildings in Sutton-on-Trent
