= St Mary's Church, Carlton-on-Trent =

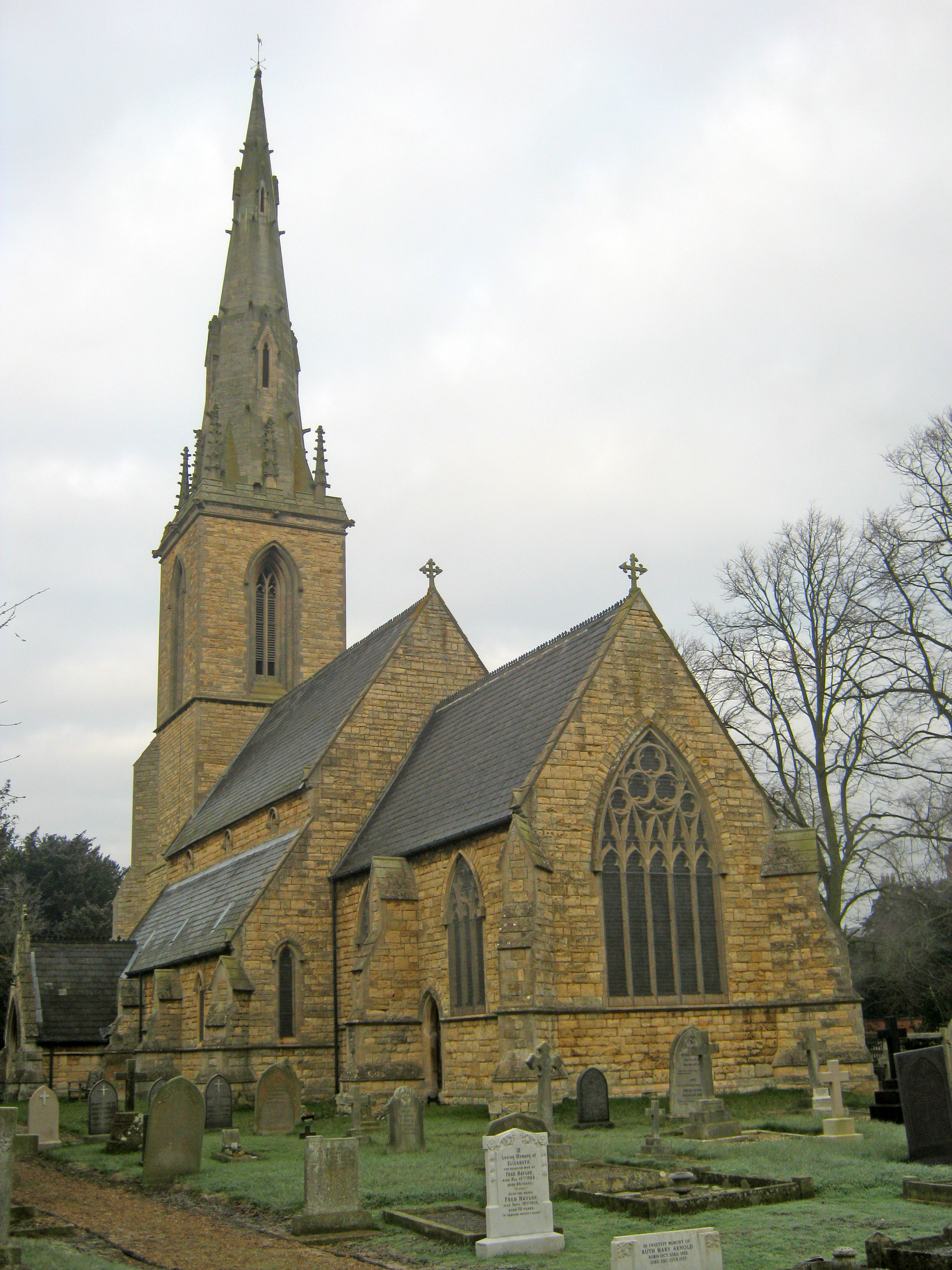
- St Mary's Church, Carlton-on-Trent
- St Mary's Church, Carlton-on-Trent
- 53°9′58.44″N 0°48′22.66″W
- OS grid reference: SK 79949 63938
- Location: Carlton-on-Trent
- Country: England
- Denomination: Church of England

History
- Dedication: St Mary

Architecture
- Heritage designation: Grade II* listed
- Architect: G. G. Place
- Completed: 1851

Administration
- Diocese: Diocese of Southwell and Nottingham
- Archdeaconry: Newark
- Deanery: Newark and Southwell
- Parish: Carlton-on-Trent

St Mary's Church, Carlton-on-Trent is a Grade II* listed parish church in the Church of England in Carlton-on-Trent.

== History ==
The church was built in 1851 to designs of the Nottingham architect, George Gordon Place. It is constructed in the Gothic Revival style.

It is part of a joint parish with:

- St Matthew's Church, Normanton-upon-Trent
- All Saints' Church, Sutton-on-Trent

== Organ ==
The church contains an organ dating from 1925 by Samuel Wort. A specification of the organ can be found on the National Pipe Organ Register.

== See also ==
- Grade II* listed buildings in Nottinghamshire
- Listed buildings in Carlton-on-Trent
