= Listed buildings in Sutton-on-Trent =

Sutton-on-Trent is a civil parish in the Newark and Sherwood district of Nottinghamshire, England. The parish contains eleven listed buildings that are recorded in the National Heritage List for England. Of these, one is listed at Grade I, the highest of the three grades, and the others are at Grade II, the lowest grade. The parish contains the village of Sutton-on-Trent and the surrounding area. The listed buildings consist of a church and items in the churchyard, houses and associated structures, farmhouses and farm buildings, two former windmills, and a former public house,

== Key ==
Grade	Criteria
I	Buildings of exceptional interest, sometimes considered to be internationally important
II	Buildings of national importance and special interest

== Buildings ==
Name and location	Photograph	Date	Notes	Grade
All Saints' Church; 53.18465°N 0.80330°W		13th century	The church has been altered and extended through the centuries, the tower was restored in 1902–03 by William Weir, and there was a restoration in 1956–58. The church is built in stone with roofs of lead and slate, and consists of a nave with a clerestory, north and south aisles, a south porch, a chancel, a vestry, a south chancel chapel, and a west tower. The tower has three stages, diagonal buttresses, a rendered plinth, two string courses, an eaves band with the remains of gargoyles, and an embattled parapet with four crocketed pinnacles. On the west side is a doorway with a fanlight and a hood mould, and above are lancet windows, two-light bell openings, and clock faces. There are also embattled parapets and crocketed pinnacles on the body of the church.	I
The Manor House; 53.17986°N 0.80313°W	—	1697	The manor house is in whitewashed rendered brick, with dentilled eaves and tile roofs. There are two storeys and attics, a double depth plan, a main range of five bays, a rear wing, and a single-storey outbuilding. The doorway has a hood on curved brackets, and the windows on the south front are sashes with moulded architraves. In the north gable is a bay window and casement windows.	II
Sundial, All Saints' Church; 53.18450°N 0.80350°W		1743	The sundial in the churchyard is in stone. It has a square vase-shaped stem with a square chamfered base and cap. At the top of the stem is an inscription and the date.	II
Former Nag's Head Inn; 53.18483°N 0.81594°W		Late 18th century	The former public house, which has been converted for residential use, is in brick with cogged and dentilled eaves, and has a pantile roof with coped gables and kneelers. There are two storeys and an H-shaped plan, with nine irregular bays. On the front is a canted bay window, in the former stable to the left is a central doorway in each floor, and many of the openings have segmental heads.	II
Sutton Windmill; 53.18011°N 0.80570°W		c. 1814	The windmill is in tarred brick, and consists of a tapering tower with five stages and an onion-domed top. It has a stepped brick plinth, cogged and rebated eaves, and contains a doorway and windows with segmental heads.	II
Carlton Windmill; 53.17040°N 0.80044°W		Early 19th century	The windmill is in brick, and consists of a round tapering tower with seven stages and cogged and rebated eaves. It contains a double doorway and casement windows, all with segmental heads.	II
Holme View Farmhouse; 53.18371°N 0.80493°W	—	Early 19th century	The farmhouse is in brick, with rebated eaves and a hipped pantile roof. There are two storeys, two bays and a square plan. In the centre is a doorway with a reeded surround, a fanlight, and a pediment on curved brackets. At the rear is a doorway with a reeded surround and a hood, and the windows are casements.	II
Farm Buildings, Holme View Farm; 53.18356°N 0.80529°W	—	Early 19th century	The farm buildings are in brick, with cogged and dentilled eaves and slate roofs, and they are arranged around four sides of a yard. On the east side is a stable and a pigeoncote with two storeys, two bays, and a three-bay round-headed blind arcade. It contains a stable door, half-round openings, vents, and a round-headed opening with four tiers of shelves. To the north is a stable with a single storey and five bays and doors with elliptical heads. On the west is a pigsty with a feeding hole and three doorways with elliptical heads, and a three-bay barn, with barn doors, vents and an elliptical pitching hole. To the south is an open cartshed.	II
The Grange; 53.17842°N 0.80481°W		Early 19th century	The farmhouse is in colourwashed stuccoed brick on a plinth, with a floor band, a cornice, a parapet, and roofs of pantile and slate. There are two storeys, a main range of three bays, and a rear wing. The middle bay is recessed, and contains a porch with Doric columns and an entablature, and a doorway with a fanlight. This is flanked by round-cornered bay windows, and above are sash windows with moulded architraves. On the south side is a flat-roofed extension containing a French window, and to the right is a two-storey three-bay rear wing. Further to the right is a single-storey three-bay stable.	II
Garden font, The Manor House; 53.17995°N 0.80275°W	—	19th century	The font in the garden is in stone. It has a square plinth and base, a stepped squat octagonal stem, and an octagonal bowl decorated with lozenges, crosses and shields.	II
Lych gate and wall, All Saints' Church; 53.18441°N 0.80357°W		19th century	The lych gate has a dwarf stone wall, a timber superstructure, and a hipped tile roof with gables. It contains a pair of timber gates with segmental heads, and a bronze memorial plaque. The boundary wall enclosing the churchyard is in brick with gabled blue brick coping, and is curved at the north end. It contains a square brick pier with a pyramidal stone cap, and a similar pair of gate piers, between which is a pair of wrought iron gates, and a wrought iron overthrow with a square lamp.	II
