= Edward Riddell =

English cricketer

Personal information
- Full name: Edward Mitford Hutton Riddell
- Born: 31 October 1845; Carlton-on-Trent, Nottinghamshire, England
- Died: 22 October 1898 (aged 52); Lincoln, Lincolnshire, England
- Batting: Right-handed
- Bowling: Right-arm medium-fast

Domestic team information
- Years: Team
- 1870–1871: Marylebone Cricket Club

Career statistics
Competition	First-class
Matches	4
Runs scored	89
Batting average	12.71
100s/50s	–/–
Top score	36
Balls bowled	248
Wickets	2
Bowling average	62.50
5 wickets in innings	–
10 wickets in match	–
Best bowling	1/33
Catches/stumpings	2/–
- Source: Cricinfo, 13 November 2019

Edward Mitford Hutton Riddell JP (31 October 1845 – 22 October 1898) was an English first-class cricketer.

The son of J. H. Riddell, he was born in October 1845 at Carlton-on-Trent, Nottinghamshire. He was educated at Uppingham School, after which he became a banker and served as a justice of the peace. Riddell played first-class cricket on four occasions, making his first-class debut for the Marylebone Cricket Club (MCC) against Nottinghamshire at Lord's in 1870. He played a first-class match for the Gentlemen of the North in the same year against the Gentlemen of the South at Beeston. He made two further first-class appearances in 1871, playing one match each for the MCC and the Gentlemen of the North. Across his four first-class matches, Riddell scored 89 runs with a high score of 36, in addition to taking two wickets with his right-arm medium-fast bowling. He died at Lincoln in October 1898.
