= Listed buildings in Normanton on Trent =

Normanton on Trent is a civil parish in the Bassetlaw District of Nottinghamshire, England. The parish contains twelve listed buildings that are recorded in the National Heritage List for England. Of these, one is listed at Grade II*, the middle of the three grades, and the others are at Grade II, the lowest grade. The parish contains the village of Normanton on Trent and the surrounding area. All the listed buildings are in the village, and consist of houses, cottages and associated structures, farmhouses and farm buildings, a church, and a war memorial in the churchyard.

== Key ==
Grade	Criteria
II*	Particularly important buildings of more than special interest
II	Buildings of national importance and special interest

== Buildings ==
Name and location	Photograph	Date	Notes	Grade
St Matthew's Church; 53.21229°N 0.81743°W		13th century	The church has been altered and extended during the centuries, and it was restored in 1859–60. It is built in stone, the chancel has a slate roof, and the other roofs are in lead. The church consists of a nave with a clerestory, north and south aisles, a south porch, a chancel, and a west tower. The tower has three stages, diagonal buttresses, string courses, a three-light arched west window, two-light bell openings, a clock face on the east side, gargoyles, and a parapet.	II*
Church Farm Farmhouse and outbuildings 53.21120°N 0.81672°W		Mid 17th century	The farmhouse has a timber framed core, it is encased in red brick, and has dentilled eaves, and a hipped pantile roof. There are two storeys and five bays, a single-storey outbuilding on the left, and a rear extension. On the front are two doorways, one blocked, and horizontally-sliding sash windows, some tripartite, and those in the ground floor with segmental heads. Inside, there is an inglenook fireplace.	II
Vine House Farmhouse; 53.21003°N 0.81634°W		Late 17th century	The farmhouse is in red brick with some render, on a plinth, with a dogtooth floor band, dentilled eaves, and a pantile roof with coped gables and kneelers. There are two storeys, four bays, and a projecting wing to the left with a single storey and attic, and two bays. On the front is a lattice porch, a doorway with a fanlight, and casement windows.	II
Marrison's House; 53.21333°N 0.81728°W	—	c. 1700	A red brick house on a rendered plinth, with a floor band, dentilled eaves, and a tile roof with coped gables and kneelers. There are two storeys and attics, five bays, and a rear lean-to. The central doorway has a fanlight, and the windows are casements.	II
The Grange, wall and outbuildings 53.20896°N 0.81698°W	—	Mid 18th century	The house is in red brick with some blue and yellow brick and stone, on a plinth with a moulded brick band, a floor band, a coped parapet with diapering, and a slate roof with raised and tumbled gables. There are two storeys, five bays, and rear extensions. The central doorway has a fanlight, and the windows are sashes. Extending to the left is a brick wall with stone coping. Attached at the rear are a single-storey outbuilding, a two-storey barn, and a pigeoncote with two storeys and a loft, and attached at the front is a single-storey outbuilding and a two-bay garage.	II
Walls and gateway, The Grange; 53.20902°N 0.81647°W	—	Late 18th century	Enclosing the grounds of the house are red brick walls with stone coping. They contain square brick piers with stone orb finials, including two flanking the gateway.	II
The Cottage and outbuilding 53.21264°N 0.81796°W	—	Late 18th century	A house in red brick on a rendered plinth, with a floor band, dentilled eaves and a pantile roof. There are two storeys, three bays, and a later rear extension. In the centre is a doorway, and the windows are horizontally-sliding sashes, most are tripartite, and those in the ground floor have segmental heads. Attached on the left is a lower outbuilding with a blocked doorway.	II
The Manor; 53.21019°N 0.81641°W		Late 18th century	The house is in red brick on a rendered base, and has a pantile roof. There are two storeys and attics, three bays, and a recessed lean-to on the right. In the centre is a doorway, the windows are tripartite casements, and all the openings have segmental heads.	II
The School House; 53.21212°N 0.81674°W		1776	A school, later a cottage, in colourwashed red brick, the left gable rendered, with a floor band, dentilled eaves, and a pantile roof, the left gable tumbled. There are two storeys and four bays, and a lower two-storey single-bay left extension. On the front is a doorway with a segmental head, the ground floor windows are tripartite horizontally-sliding sash windows with segmental heads, and the upper floor contains tripartite casements. Between the upper floor windows is an inscribed stone plaque.	II
Normanton Hall; 53.21203°N 0.81789°W	—	1820	The house is in red brick, partly rendered, with a moulded eaves band and a hipped slate roof. There are two storeys and three bays. The central doorway has attached Roman Doric columns, an entablature with triglyphs and guttae, a modillion cornice and a pediment. The windows are casements, one with a round and traceried head.	II
Normanton Hall Lodge; 53.21175°N 0.81684°W		c. 1820	The lodge is in red brick on a blue brick base, with sprocket eaves and a slate roof, hipped on the right. There is a single storey and three bays. On the front are three recessed round arches, the right containing a doorway and the others casement windows, all with round heads and fanlights. On the right return are three similar blind arches.	II
War memorial 53.21232°N 0.81715°W		1920	The war memorial is in the churchyard of St Michael's church, and is in granite. It consists of an obelisk on a plinth, on a base of three steps. On the front of the obelisk is a laurel wreath in relief. On the lower part of the obelisk and on the plinth are inscriptions and the names of those lost in the two World Wars.	II
