= Listed buildings in Carlton-on-Trent =

Carlton-on-Trent is a civil parish in the Newark and Sherwood district of Nottinghamshire, England. The parish contains 16 listed buildings that are recorded in the National Heritage List for England. Of these, two are at Grade II*, the middle of the three grades, and the others are at Grade II, the lowest grade. The parish contains the village of Carlton-on-Trent and the surrounding area. All the listed buildings are in the village, and consist of houses, cottages and associated structures, farmhouses and farm buildings, and a church.

== Key ==
Grade	Criteria
II*	Particularly important buildings of more than special interest
II	Buildings of national importance and special interest

== Buildings ==
Name and location	Photograph	Date	Notes	Grade
Ferry Farm House; 53.16842°N 0.80287°W		1737	The farmhouse is in brick on a rendered plinth, with cogged eaves, and a pantile roof with stone coped gables and kneelers. There are two storeys and attics, seven bays, and a rear outshut. The doorway has a segmental head, and the windows are a mix of casements and horizontally-sliding sashes, all with cambered heads.	II
Sundial, Carlton Hall; 53.16711°N 0.80597°W	—	18th century	The sundial to the south of the house is in stone. It has a round plinth, a fluted baluster stem, and a moulded capital with four curved iron struts. On the top is a bronze dial.	II
Wall, gate piers and gates, Carlton Hall; 53.16735°N 0.80542°W		18th century	The boundary wall is in brick, and has ramped copings in terracotta and stone. The main entrance on the east side has four gate piers with ornamental wrought iron gates in the centre, and curving walls between the outer piers. The piers are square, with plinths, bands and pyramidal caps. To the north is an entrance to the stable yard with two piers, and beyond are three elliptical blind arches.	II
Holly Cottage; 53.16607°N 0.80748°W	—	18th century	The cottage is in colourwashed brick, with cogged eaves, and a pantile roof with coped gables and kneelers. There is a single storey and attics, and an L-shaped plan, consisting of a two-bay front range and a later two-storey rear wing. In the centre is a doorway, the windows are horizontally-sliding sashes with segmental heads, and there are two gabled dormers.	II
Park Farm House; 53.16559°N 0.80684°W		18th century	Originally an inn to which a dining room was added in 1788, the farmhouse is in brick, and has roofs of slate and pantile, and gables with decorative bargeboards. The main block has two storeys and an L-shaped plan, with a front of five bays containing sash windows with rubbed brick heads, and a three-bay rear wing. The dining room to the right has a single storey and three bays. In the centre is a doorway with a segmental head, flanked by Venetian windows. The south front contains two doorways with gabled hoods on curved brackets, sash windows, and some blind windows.	II
The Dower House and wall 53.16762°N 0.80516°W		18th century	The house, which was altered in the 19th century, is in brick on a plinth, with a floor band, an eaves band, a bracketed cornice and a balustrade. There are three storeys and three bays, and wings to the west and north. On the front is a doorway with a moulded surround, a fanlight, and a hood on pierced brackets. This flanked by square bay windows with shafts, cornices and balustrades, and in the upper floors are sash windows with moulded architraves. To the east is a two-storey two-bay service wing, to its right is an outhouse, and to the north is a rear wing. To the south is a wall with a pierced balustrade, three piers with pyramidal caps, and a pair of ornate cast iron gates.	II
The Grey House; 53.16570°N 0.80654°W		18th century	Two houses, later combined, in brick, partly roughcast and colourwashed, with hipped slate roofs. The left part has two storeys and five bays, a central doorway with a fanlight, and a hood on scrolled brackets. The windows are sashes with segmental heads. The right block has three storeys and three bays. The outer bays contain two-storey canted bay windows with dentilled cornices. The other windows are sashes in architraves, the central window in the middle floor with a pediment on scrolled brackets. The south front of the rear wing has a Doric porch, and there are two more two-storey wings, and a billiard room.	II
Carlton Hall; 53.16734°N 0.80594°W		1765	A country house in brick on a stone plinth, with floor bands, cogged and dentilled eaves, a coped parapet, and slate roofs with pedimented gables. It consists of a three-storey central block, two-storey flanking wings, and a service range to the north. The east front has a central recessed bay flanked by full height canted bay windows. In the centre is a Doric porch on four columns, a dated frieze, and an entablature, above which are two Venetian windows. The flanking wings have three bays, the middle bay with a pediment, and contain sash windows. The central bay of the west front projects under a pediment, there is a Doric porch with a pediment, and the outer wings also have a central pedimented bay. Some windows are mullioned and transomed, and others are sashes. The service wing has two storeys and six bays, and sash windows.	II*
Yew Tree Farmhouse; 53.16993°N 0.80731°W	—	1798	The farmhouse, which was later extended, is in brick with dentilled eaves and a pantile roof. There are two storeys and attics, and an L-shaped plan, with a front range of four bays, and a rear wing to the north. On the front is a doorway and a datestone, most of the windows are horizontally-sliding sashes, some with segmental heads, and the others are casements.	II
Barn, Yew Tree Farm; 53.17005°N 0.80750°W	—	c. 1798	A threshing barn with dentilled eaves and a pantile roof. There is a single storey and three bays. It contains various openings, some of which are blocked, and vents in various patterns.	II
Pigeoncote and stable, Yew Tree Farm; 53.16987°N 0.80765°W	—	c. 1798	The pigeoncote and stable are in brick, with dentilled eaves, and pantile roofs with stepped coped gables and kneelers. They are in one and two storeys and have three bays. The pigeoncote contains a stable doorway with a segmental head and a casement window, above which is a square opening with four tiers of pigeonholes. The stable contains stable doors and a casement window.	II
Stable block, Carlton Hall; 53.16789°N 0.80549°W		Early 19th century	The stable block is in yellow and red brick with slate roof. There is a central block of two storeys and five bays, the middle bay projecting under a pedimented gable containing a clock face, and flanking single-storey wings. In the centre is a round-headed arch, over which is a square opening. The outer bays contain a mix of casement and horizontally-sliding sash windows. In the wings are garage doors, and round-headed carriage doors. On the roof is a round bell turret with four timber columns, a domed leaded roof, and a wind vane.	II
The Old Smithy; 53.16416°N 0.80735°W		Early 19th century	The smithy, later a private house, is in brick with a floor band, rebated eaves and a hipped pantile roof. Thee are two storeys, a main front of five bays, two bays facing the road, and a rear lean-to. On the front facing the road is a projecting painted brick arch in the form of a horseshoe, containing garage doors and an inscribed board. On the south front is a gabled porch, a bay window with a conical roof, and casement windows.	II
St Mary's Church; 53.16659°N 0.80556°W		1849–51	The spire was added to the church, which incorporates a 12th-century south doorway, in 1871. The church is built in stone with slate roofs, and consists of a nave with a clerestory, north and south aisles, a south porch, a chancel and vestry, and a west steeple. The steeple has a tower with three stages, four string courses, an eaves band with eight gargoyles, and an embattled parapet with eight crocketed pinnacles. On the tower is a recessed crocketed spire with two tiers of lucarnes, a finial and a weathercock. On the west side of the tower is a doorway with a moulded surround, lancet windows, and tall two-light bell openings. The south doorway has a chamfered round head, a moulded surround, and shafts with moulded bases and capitals.	II*
Ferry Cottage; 53.16873°N 0.80239°W	—	19th century	The cottage is in yellow brick on a chamfered plinth, and has a tile roof with diapering, and gables with pierced bargeboards. There is a single storey with attics, a cruciform plan, and three bays. The doorway has a segmental head, and the windows have rubbed brick heads, some with hood moulds.	II
Coach House, The Grey House; 53.16583°N 0.80605°W		Mid 19th century	The former coach house is in grey brick, with chamfered corners, and a hipped and gabled slate roof. There are two storeys and three bays, the middle bay projecting under a gable, and containing a pair of segmental-headed doors. Elsewhere, there are doors with segmental heads, and casement windows, some with round-arched heads.	II
