= Normanton on Trent =

Village in Nottinghamshire, England

Coordinates: 53.22°N 0.82°W

- Village and civil parish
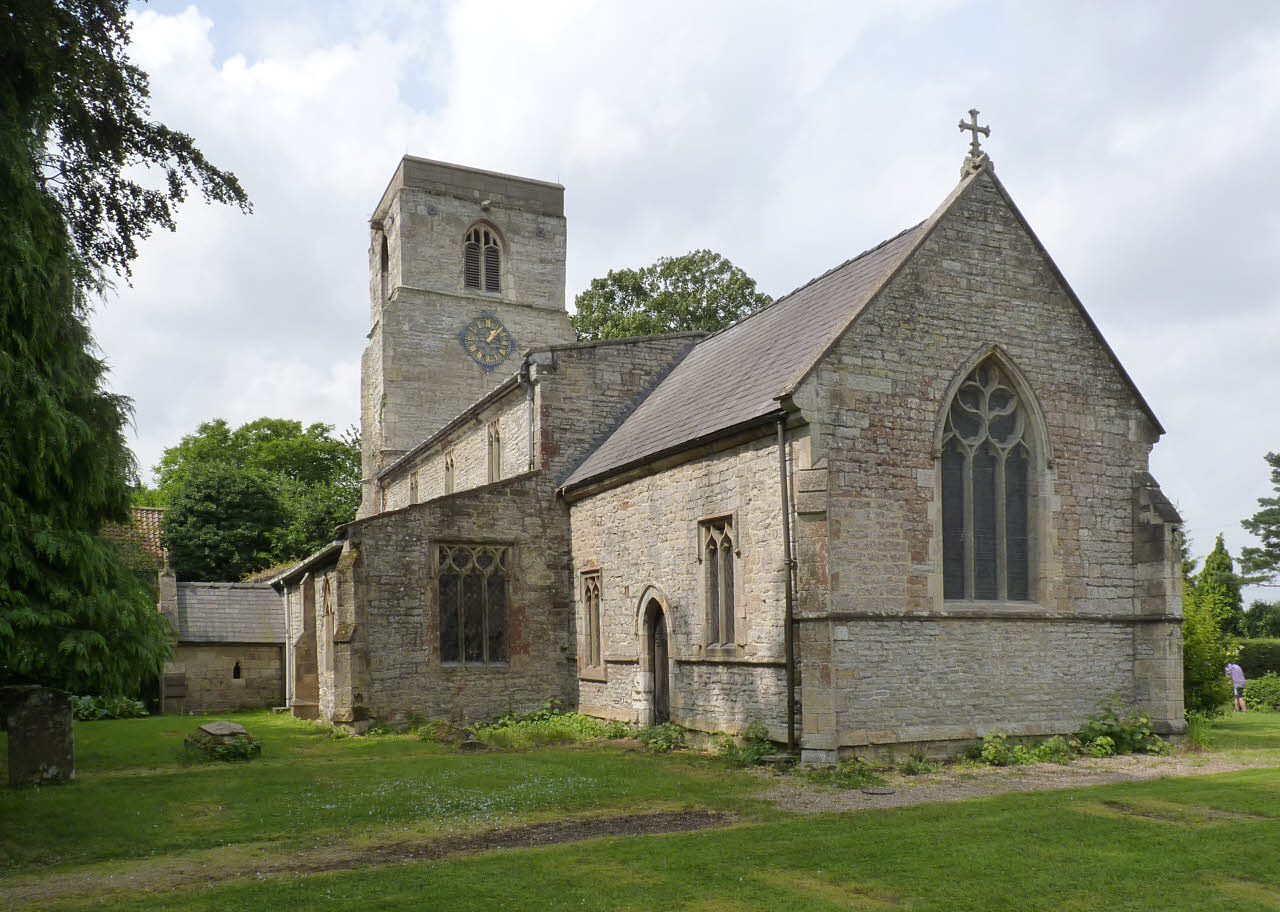
- Church of St Matthew, Normanton-on-Trent

- Location within Nottinghamshire
- Interactive map of Normanton on Trent
- Area: 1.7 sq mi (4.4 km^{2})
- Population: 385 (2021)
  - Density: 226/sq mi (87/km^{2})
- OS grid reference: SK 790690
  - London: 120 mi (190 km) SSE
- District: Bassetlaw
- Shire county: Nottinghamshire
- Region: East Midlands
- Country: England
- Sovereign state: United Kingdom
- Post town: NEWARK
- Postcode district: NG23
- Dialling code: 01636
- Police: Nottinghamshire
- Fire: Nottinghamshire
- Ambulance: East Midlands
- UK Parliament: Newark
- Website: normantonontrentparishcouncil.gov.uk/

Normanton on Trent is a village in Nottinghamshire, England. It is nine miles south-east of Retford.

According to the 2001 census it had a population of 299, increasing to 345 at the 2011 census, and 385 in 2021. In 1848, it had 362 inhabitants.

The parish church of St Matthew is a Grade II* listed building, dating from the 13th century. Other listed buildings in Normanton include the Grade II listed Manor House on South Street; Normanton Hall on Main Street; and the former School House also on Main Street. The latter has an inscription: "Henry Jackson of this town Gent built and endowed this school for four pounds a year for the education of ten poor children belonging to this parish Anno Dom 1776".

There are two public houses (The Square and Compass and The Crown), however there are no shops. The nearest shop is the Co-Op, in Sutton-on-Trent. There is a Primary school in Normanton-on-Trent, St.Matthews C of E Primary school.

== See also ==
- Listed buildings in Normanton on Trent
