= Sutton-on-Trent =

Village and civil parish in Nottinghamshire, England

Coordinates: 53.185°N 0.808°W

Sutton on Trent
- Village and civil parish
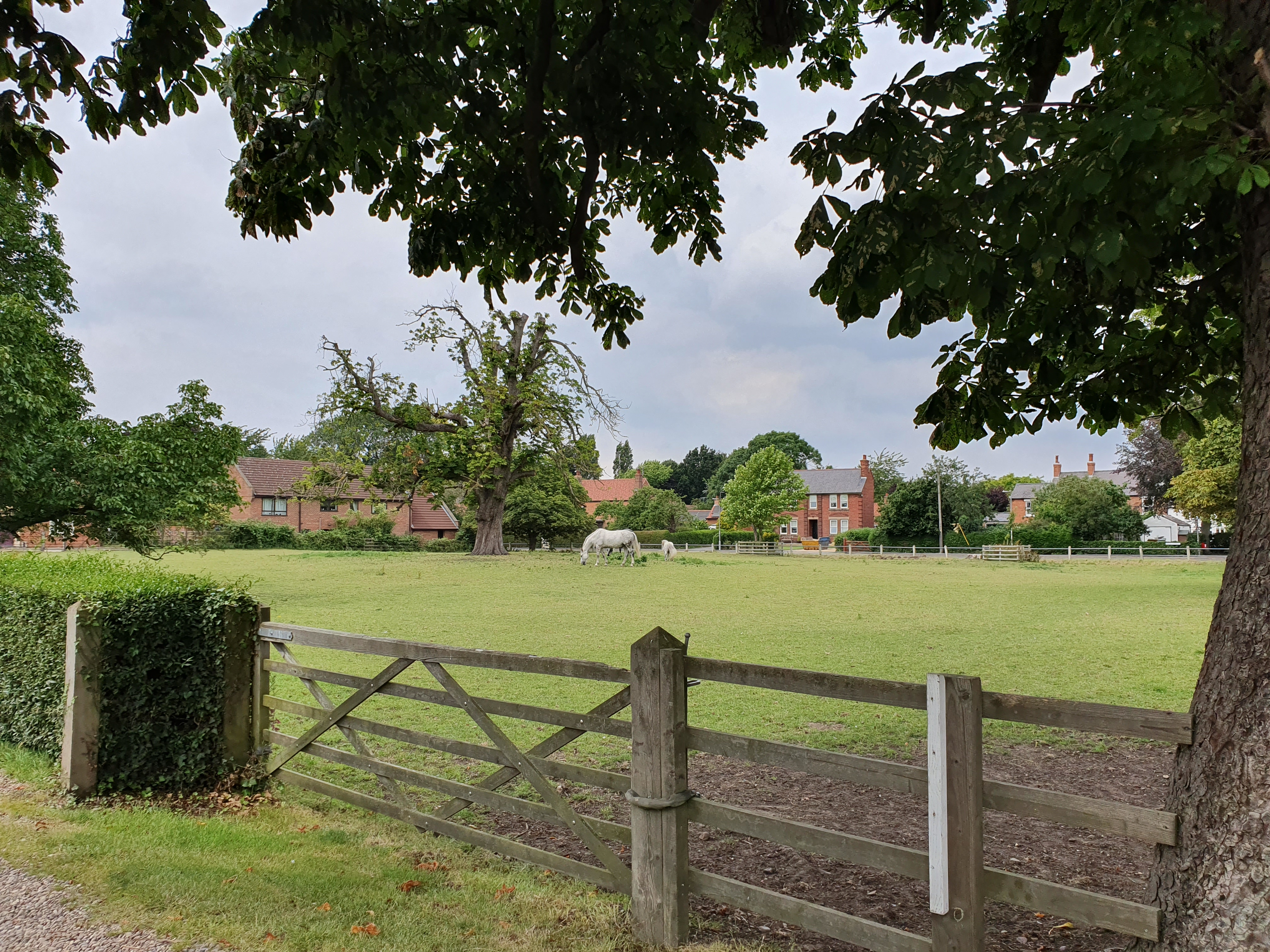
- Sutton-on-Trent field, taken on Main Street

- Location within Nottinghamshire
- Interactive map of Sutton on Trent
- Area: 4.14 sq mi (10.7 km^{2})
- Population: 1,417 (2021)
  - Density: 342/sq mi (132/km^{2})
- OS grid reference: SK 794658
  - London: 120 mi (190 km) SSE
- District: Newark and Sherwood
- Shire county: Nottinghamshire
- Region: East Midlands
- Country: England
- Sovereign state: United Kingdom
- Post town: NEWARK
- Postcode district: NG23
- Dialling code: 01636
- Police: Nottinghamshire
- Fire: Nottinghamshire
- Ambulance: East Midlands
- UK Parliament: Newark
- Website: www.suttonontrent.org.uk

Sutton-on-Trent is a large village and civil parish in Nottinghamshire, situated on the Great North Road, and on the west bank of the River Trent. The village contains 2,651 acres (4.142 sq mi; 1,073 ha; 10.73 km^{2}) of land and according to the 2001 census it had a population of 1,327, increasing marginally to 1,331 at the 2011 census, and more substantially to 1,417 at the 2021 census.

== History ==
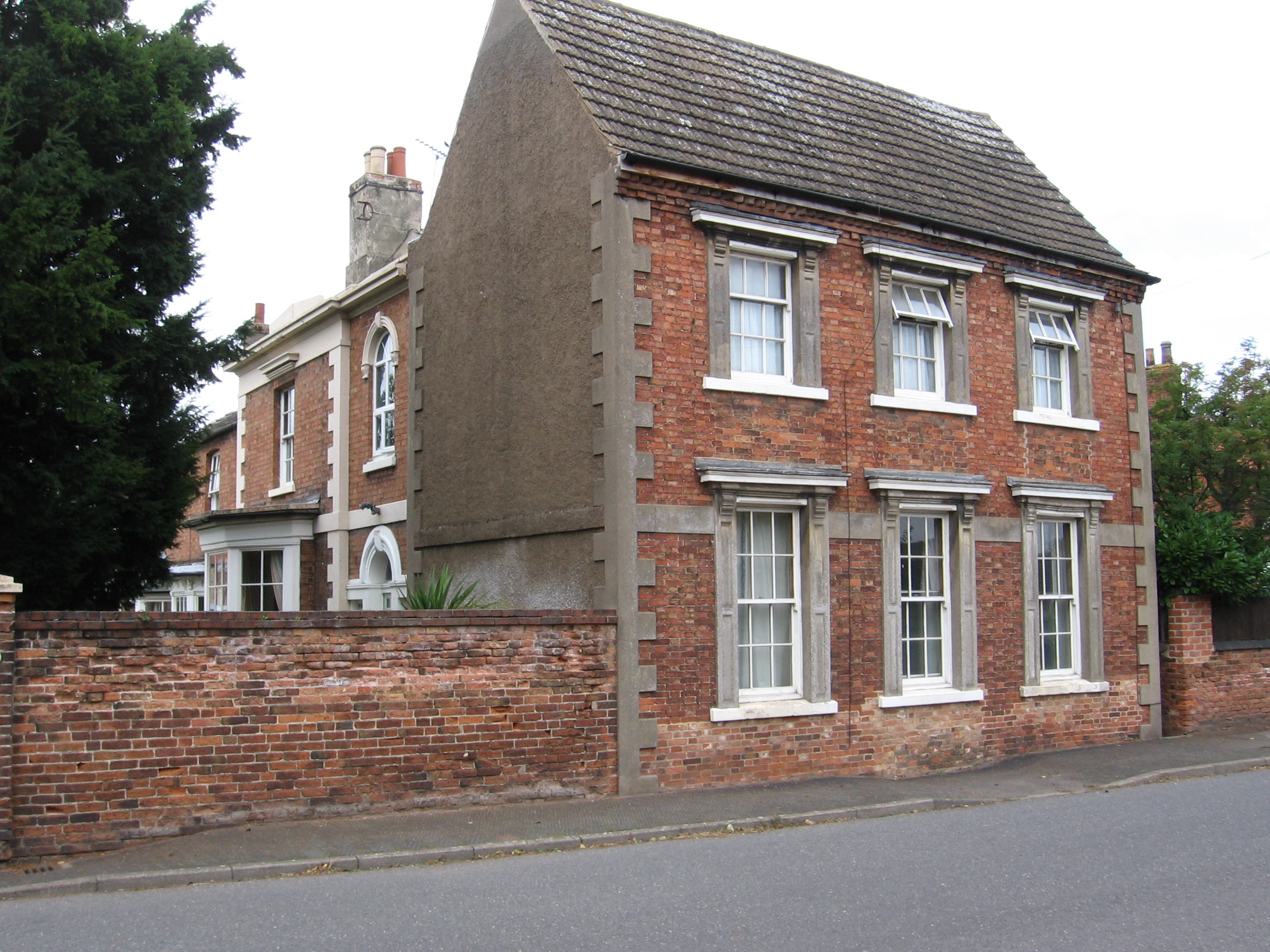
Vine House

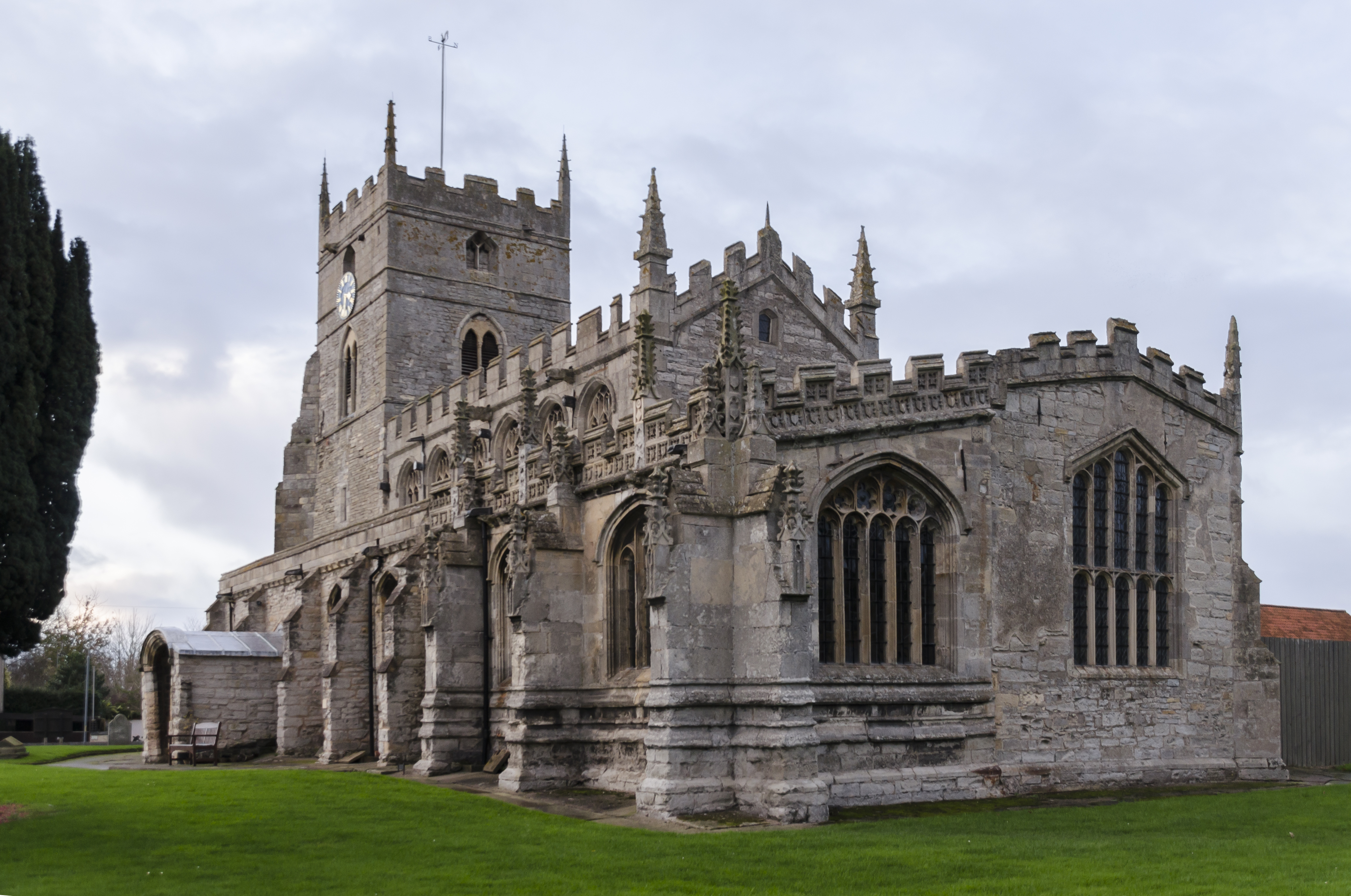
All Saints' Church

Dredging of the river has revealed fossilized mammoth's teeth and tusks, Roman and Anglo Saxon pottery.

The town is mentioned in the Domesday Book of 1086, and a Norman church was built in the 13th century.

Oliver Sutton, Bishop of Lincoln from 1280 to 1299, was from the Sutton branch of the influential Lexington family on his mother's side. He was an unusually popular bishop and officiated at the funeral of Queen Eleanor in 1290.

In May 1686 the manor and lordship of Sutton-on-Trent were sold to Richard Levett, later Lord Mayor of London, and his wife Mary.

In Far Holme Lane can be found the Old Manse and the Old Chapel - these are the remnants of the small Particular Baptist church that existed here from 1822 to the 1900s. Although some Baptist historical writing suggests that the church was founded by Alexander Jamieson with the support of the wealthy Haldane brothers of Glasgow in the period 1800–1810, there is fairly convincing evidence that it was actually 'planted' by the Collingham Baptist congregation under William Nichols. George Pope may then have become its own minister - before himself moving to Collingham. Nichols was active in the village as early as 1809. Nichols wrote an obituary of a Sutton woman in the Baptist Magazine, volume 7, 1815, which provides one of the few accounts of the life of an ordinary Sutton-on-Trent woman that we have and so is worth repeating verbatim:

JANE RICHARDSON of Sutton on Trent, near Newark, who died January 23d, 1815, aged 81 years.

On our first going to Sutton, to preach the gospel, in 1809, this old disciple was made known to us. She then expressed to me the joy and pleasure it afforded her that the gospel was brought to that wicked village —" Here I have been, like a poor speckled bird, ever since I came to it, shut out from hearing the word, which I had enjoyed in my former situation, though I had then to walk five miles on the Lord's day, and often to wade to the knees in water, but I found the word sweet to my soul, which made amends for all my trouble of getting to the house of God. O! how I have lamented the loss of those means of grace; but I hope that Lord has not left me; and now I pray that the preaching here may be blessed to my soul, and to my neighbours, who are dead in trespasses and sins, though they know it not."

When she understood we were of the Baptist denomination, she said, "I wish they were not, for I cannot see any necessity for our being dipped, besides, if it should be the right way l am too old now. She, however, began to read the New Testament with a spirit of inquiry, and while thus engaged, she found that Jesus was baptized- That he ordered his apostles to baptize as well as preach, and that this was to be extended to by all succeeding ministers, to the end of the world. One morning, after having been reading thus, she hastened to a neighbour, with her bible in her hand, to whom she said, " Well, neighbour, I believe Baptism is right, and if it please the Lord to give me strength, I will be baptized, old as I am." Her neighbour replied —" I don't believe it, I won't believe it, nor would I have you trouble your head about it —I don't like this baptism, for my part."—' Well, neighbour, but if Jesus Christ has commanded us to follow his example, saying, thus it becometh us to fulfil all righteousness," as you see it is here in the third chapter of Matthew, and the fifteenth verse —I think we ought. I shall, therefore, offer myself for baptism, if it please the Lord to spare me." This she did in the spirit of love to her Lord and Saviour without delay—On the 7th of April, 1811, the day appointed for her to relate her Christian experience to the church, at Collingham, previous to her being baptized, she rose early in the morning to walk thither, a distance of three miles. Her aged husband offered to go with her, but she replied, you need not do that, the Lord will go with me; accordingly she tied a small bundle of cloths to her side, took her two sticks, and arrived by eight o'clock.

No sooner had she taken some refreshment, than she began to sing a hymn. I said, "well my friend you appear to have got here better than one could expect at your time of life. "O yes," she replied, " and my heart is full of joy; and I believe the Lord will carry me through the duties before me this day." She gave in her experience before the church with great composure, and went through the ordinance of baptism with great courage. On leaving us, to return in the evening, she said, at parting, "blessed be my God and Saviour for this day." Thus, like the eunuch, she went on her way rejoicing. She afterwards met with persecution from the ungodly around her, but in the general, she was carried above it, rejoicing that she was accounted worthy to Suffer shame for Christ's sake. Her attendance on the means of grace was uniform and serious; she appeared to find the word of God and eat it, and it was the joy and rejoicing of her soul.

When certain professors tried to draw her aside, and poison her mind, she would either turn a deaf ear, or reply, "O let us be thankful for the gospel which God has sent among an unworthy people." And in reference to those attempts, she said to a friend a few days before she died, "Blessed be God, they never moved me at all."

When confined by her last illness, being visited by a Christian friend, who asked her whether he should pray for her recovery, she replied, "Pray that the Lord's will may be done concerning me, I desire not anything contrary to his will, life or death." And thus she departed, committing herself into the hands of Christ, knowing in whom she had believed, and being fully persuaded he was able to keep that she had committed to him against that day.

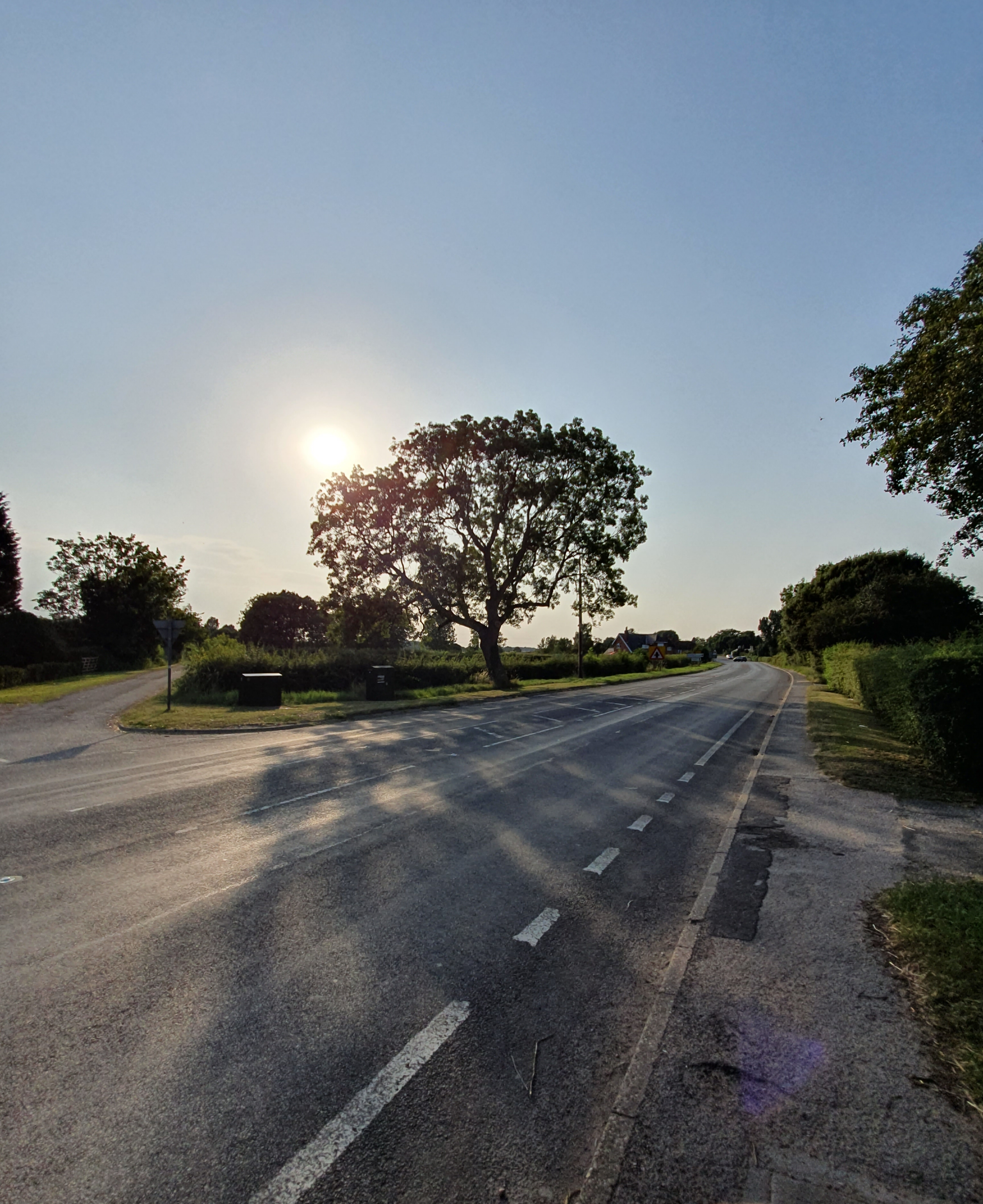
The Great North Road, through Sutton-on-Trent

In 1870–1872, Sutton-on-Trent was described as:

A village and a parish in Southwell district, Notts. The village stands 1½ mile N by E of Carlton r. station, and 8 N of Newark; was once a market-town; is a polling place; and has a post-office under Newark. The parish comprises 2,930 acres. Real property, £6,753. Pop. in 1851, 1,262; in 1861, 1,147. Houses, 281. The manor belongs to the Right Hon. J. E. Denison. There are corn mills. The living. is a vicarage in the diocese of Lincoln. Value, £280. Patron, Rev.Graystone. The church was repaired in 1848. There are chapels for Independents, Baptists, and Wesleyans, a slightly endowed school, and charities £5.

Sutton Mill was a stone-built tower windmill, built in 1825. It was owned by the Bingham family of Grassthorpe from the 1860s until 1984. The four-storey tower has been converted to a house.

A Board School was leased from the Church School Trustees and endowed in 1816, and Sutton Mill a stone tower windmill built in 1825, (It is now a residence) and by 1900 the area was known for its basket making. A feastival is still held on the first of November each year.

== Geography ==
It is located eight miles (13 km) north of Newark-on-Trent, which takes approximately 20 minutes to reach by car, and ten miles (16 km) miles south of Retford, which takes approximately 22 minutes to reach by car.

== Amenities ==
The village has one pub, The Lord Nelson on Main Street, which is independently owned and operated by a local family. The pub has a mixed use room at the front which is often used for live music, and a restaurant at the rear. The pub also has several en-suite rooms available. The village has a busy doctors' surgery (Hounsfield Surgery), which has three resident GPs, two nurses and visiting midwives. There is a well-stocked Co-op on High Street and two independent butchers, one on Main Street and Hadley's on Great North Road.

The library has recently moved into the Methodist Church which hosts coffee mornings one Saturday per month. The Sutton on Trent Sports Club on Grassthorpe Road had a full renovation in 2019. The small village hall on the Crow Park estate (Snell Road) has a pop-up Post Office on limited days and times. A new Community Centre is planned to be built at the back of the new estate, currently being built off Grassthorpe Road, this estate will also house a new shop and additional parking for the GP surgery.

The village also has two hairdressing salons (Helen's Hairdressing and The Box), a retired greyhound sanctuary on Great North Road, and a fuel station. Marshall's Bus Company (Marshall's of Sutton on Trent) are based in the village and a large employer, having two sites - one for buses and one for coaches. Marshall's operate several regular routes around the Newark area and also provide a Retford - Newark bus service which passes through the village.

There is an industrial estate on the north side of the village has several small units. Other larger local employers are Mercia Garden Products, Project Timber (both in Sutton on Trent), JG Pears, in High Marnham, which is 2 miles away and Caledonian Modular in Carlton on Trent, which is 1.5 miles away.

== Festival ==
An annual festival is held normally on the first weekend in September. The festival is organised by the Festival Committee with local businesses and residents. Normally the event consists of classic cars, a steam rally, morris dancing, dog agility, music by local bands and artists, food and drink. The bar is supplied and operated by The Milestone Brewery. The festival field and parking field are kindly loaned by the Marshall and Watkinson family.

== Organisations ==
As an extremely active village, there are many clubs and organisations which meet in the village: Morris Dancing Club; Sutton on Trent Cycling Club; Bridge Club; The W.I.; Sutton on Trent History Club; Slimming World; U11 Football Club.

== Unity Magazine ==
A monthly magazine is published which covers the villages of Sutton on Trent, Carlton on Trent, Weston, Grassthorpe and Normanton on Trent. The magazine has remained at 50p per edition for many years and is a great source of local information.

== Churches ==
Sutton on Trent has two churches; All Saints' Church on Church Street is part of The Beck and Trent Benefice (Church of England) and Sutton on Trent Methodist Church on High Street, which is part of Newark and Southwell Methodist. Both churches are active within the village and have regular services.

== Schools ==
Sutton on Trent Primary School is state school feeding into Tuxford Academy. It is managed by Nottinghamshire County Council. There is a board of governors and has a Breakfast and After School Club.

== Notable people ==
Sir Godfrey Hounsfield was born in Sutton-on-Trent on 28 August 1919, he went on to share the 1979 Nobel Prize for Physiology or Medicine with Allan MacLeod Cormack for his part in developing the diagnostic technique of X-ray computed tomography (CT). The doctors Surgery on Hounsfield Way is named for him. He is buried in the cemetery on Ingram lane.

== Gallery ==
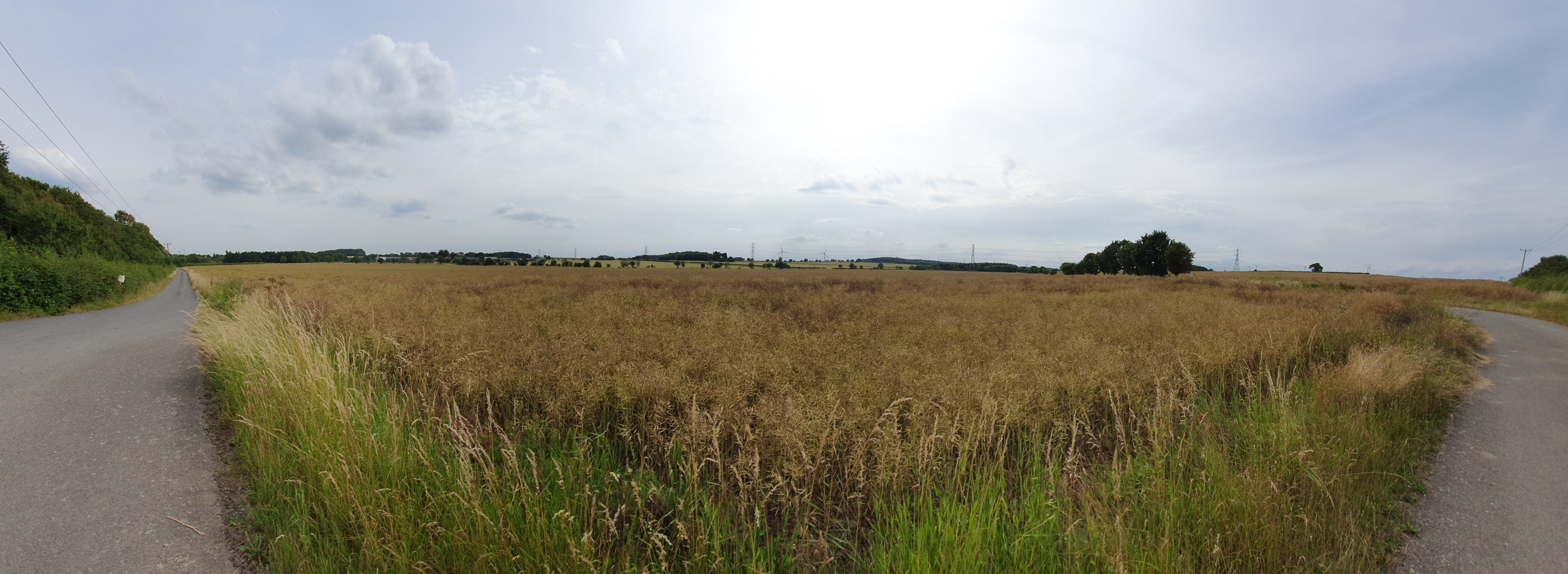
A panoramic view of fields in Sutton-on-Trent

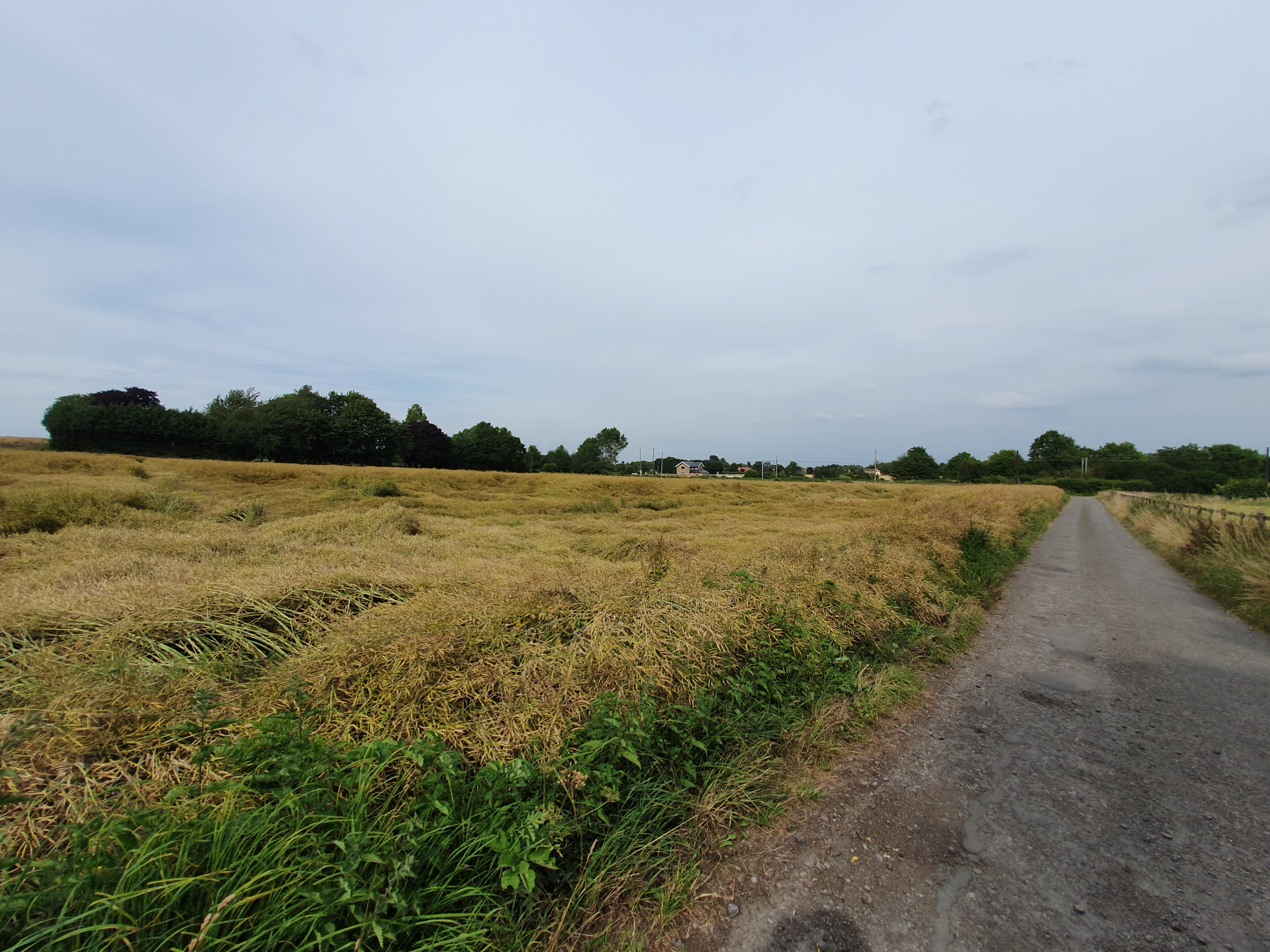
Sutton-on-Trent scenery taken on Mulberry Path

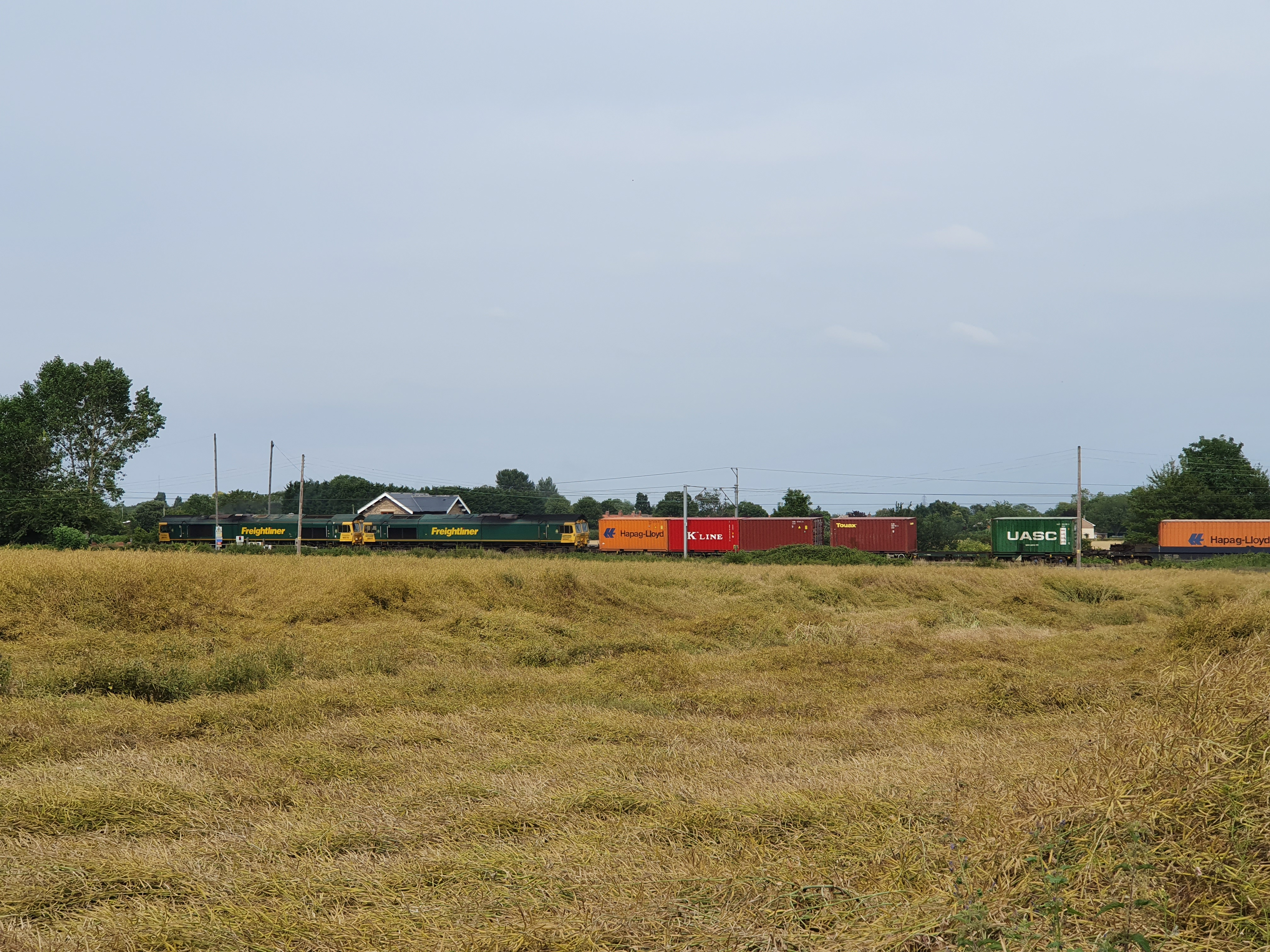
Train passing through Sutton-on-Trent. Taken on Mulberry Path.

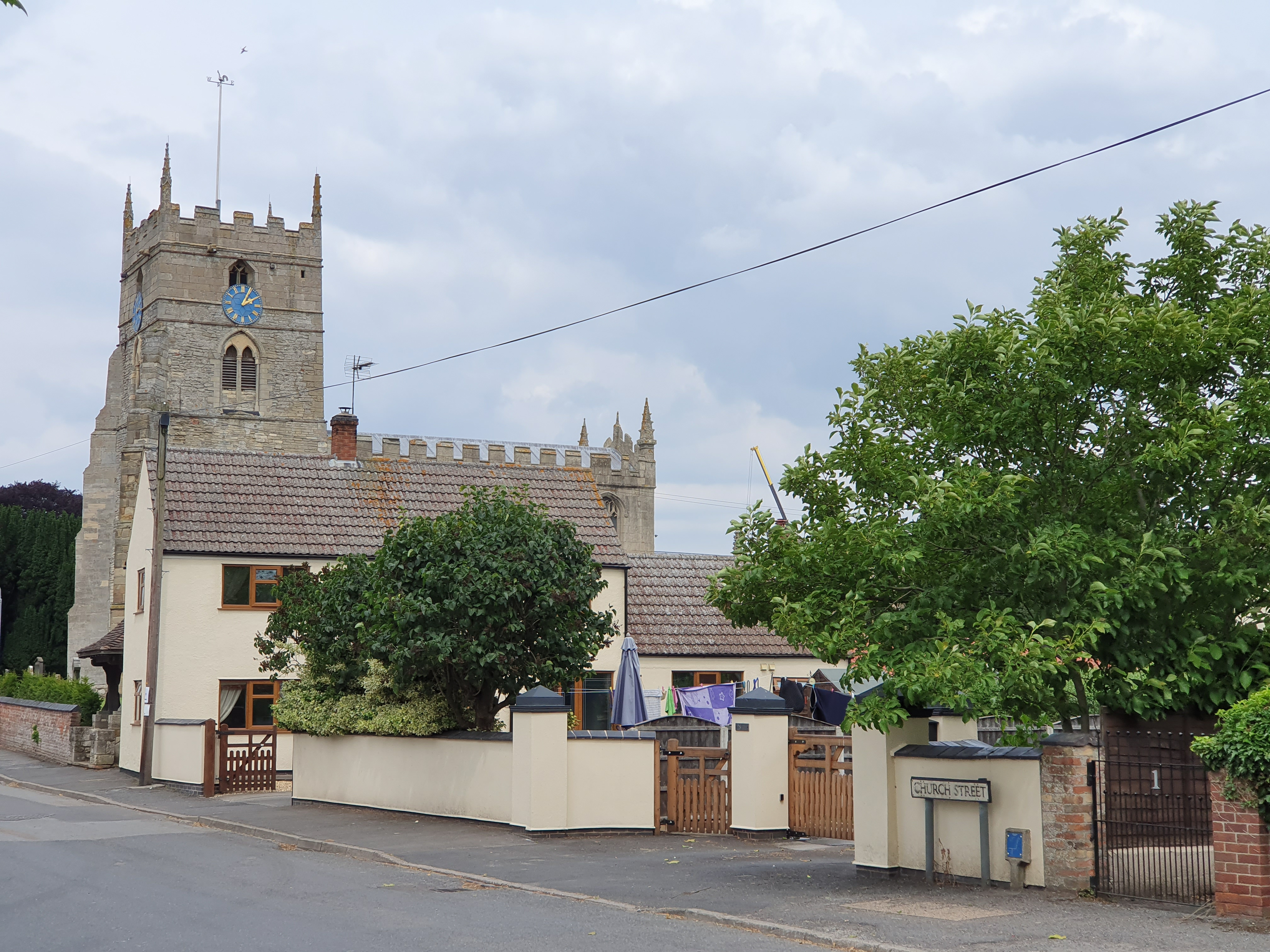
All Saints' church, on Church Street

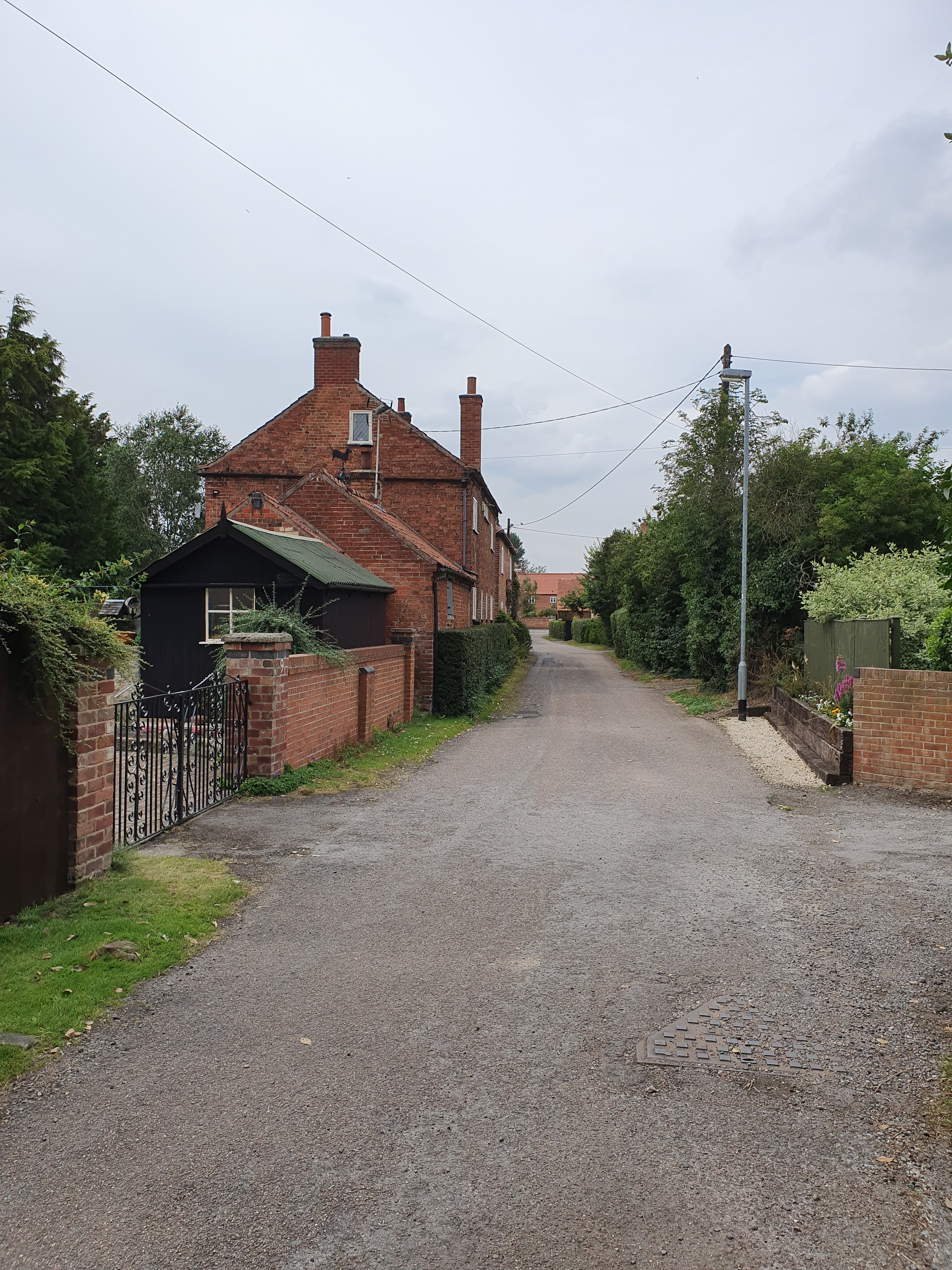
Middle Holme Lane, Sutton-on-Trent

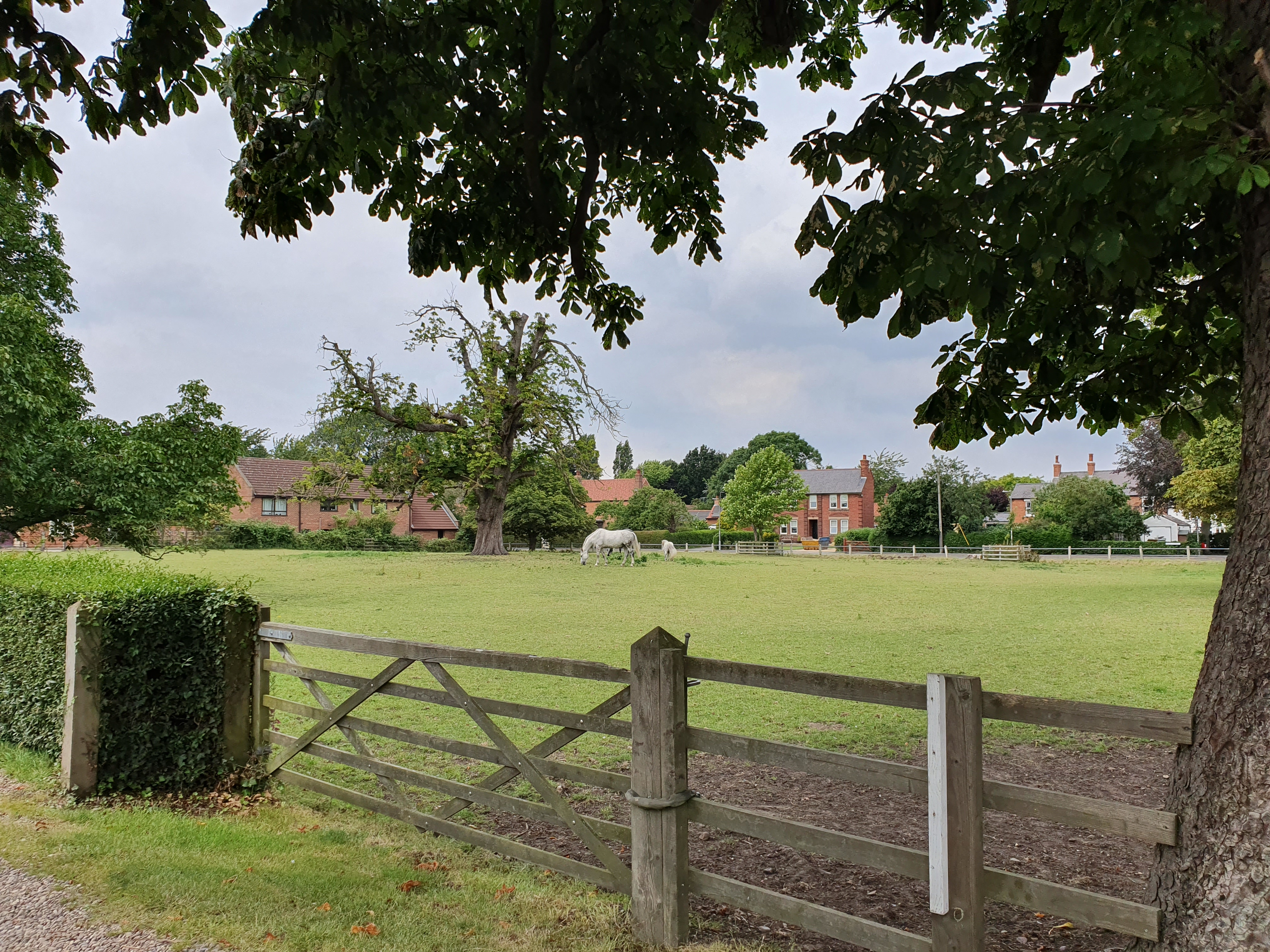
Sutton-on-Trent field, taken on Main Street

== See also ==
- Listed buildings in Sutton-on-Trent
- The Great North Road
