= Carlton-on-Trent =

Village and civil parish in England

Coordinates: 53.1658°N 0.8066°W

- Village and civil parish
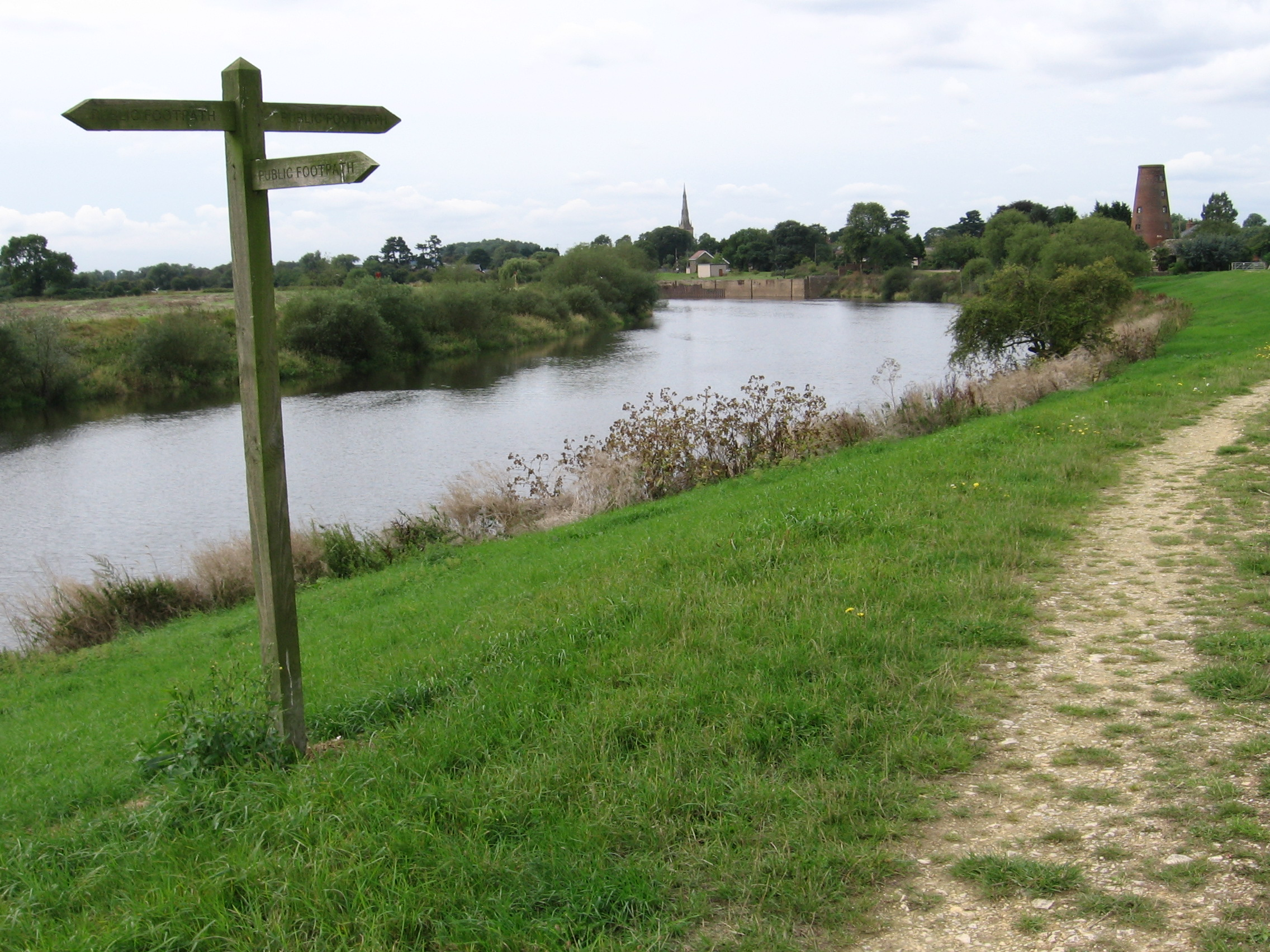
- River Trent, Church Spire and Windmill

- Location within Nottinghamshire
- Interactive map of Carlton-on-Trent
- Area: 1.39 sq mi (3.6 km^{2})
- Population: 230 (2021)
  - Density: 165/sq mi (64/km^{2})
- OS grid reference: SK 795635
  - London: 115 mi (185 km) SSE
- District: Newark and Sherwood
- Shire county: Nottinghamshire
- Region: East Midlands
- Country: England
- Sovereign state: United Kingdom
- Post town: NEWARK
- Postcode district: NG23
- Dialling code: 01636
- Police: Nottinghamshire
- Fire: Nottinghamshire
- Ambulance: East Midlands
- UK Parliament: Newark
- Website: Carlton-on-Trent parish council website

Carlton-on-Trent is a small village and civil parish in England, located between the River Trent and the A1 road near Newark-on-Trent in Nottinghamshire. The population of the civil parish was 228 at the 2001 census, increasing only marginally to 229 at the 2011 census and similarly to 230 at the 2021 census.

The village forms part of the Newark and Sherwood district, it is served by a parish council.

The village has several entries in the Domesday Book, mainly for the year 1086 relating to the Records of the Exchequer, and its related bodies, with those of the Office of First Fruits and Tenths, and the Court of Augmentations. Associated names for these entries include The Earl Tosti and the Man of Rodger De Bully.

Carlton Mill was a six-storey brick tower windmill built before 1821. The tower is still standing, as a shell without floors, to a height of 60 feet.

== Notable people ==
- Edward Riddell (1845–1898), first-class cricketer

== See also ==
- Listed buildings in Carlton-on-Trent
