= William Weir (architect) =

Scottish architect

William Weir (20 September 1865 – 8 July 1950) was a Scottish architect who specialised in the repair of ancient structures.

William Weir

Weir left school at sixteen to become a pupil of Edinburgh architect Archibald MacPherson, while also attending the Edinburgh School of Art. He moved to London at nineteen to work in the studios of first Leonard Stokes and then Arts and Crafts pioneer Philip Webb.

Weir set up independent practice in 1900 and was admitted as a Licentiate member of the Royal Institute of British Architects in 1911.

William Weir is best known for overseeing repairs to historic buildings including Dartington Hall, Tattershall Castle and Bodiam Castle. His work spanned more than forty British counties and more than 300 buildings, including scores of small town and country churches. He collaborated with many of the leading figures of the Arts and Crafts Movement such as William Morris, Ernest Gimson, Norman Jewson and Detmar Blow.

Weir's work at Dartington Hall, near Totnes, Devon, consisted of the restoration of seriously depressed manor house buildings of about 1388. The buildings consist of the three storey west range of the courtyard, where he removed external stairways to the upper floors and internalised all the vertical circulation. He re-planned the accommodation internally, including installing plumbing, heating and electrical wiring. The east range is similar in arrangement but may not have had external staircases. Weir put an oak hammerbeam roof on the Great Hall and renovated doors and windows. The profile of the beams was gleaned from the shadowy remains on the plaster walls of the exact dimensions of the roof trusses. The spacing of trusses was established by the window spacing below. The kitchens were cleaned up and provided with new hammerbeam roofs clad externally in local slate.

From his mid-thirties Weir was a committed campaigner for the Society for the Protection of Ancient Buildings, founded by Webb and Morris to promote the repair (rather than restoration) of ancient buildings. An SPAB annual report in the 1920s said Weir had "perhaps been more closely connected with [the society] than any other individual architect."
