= Nottingham Corporation Tramways =

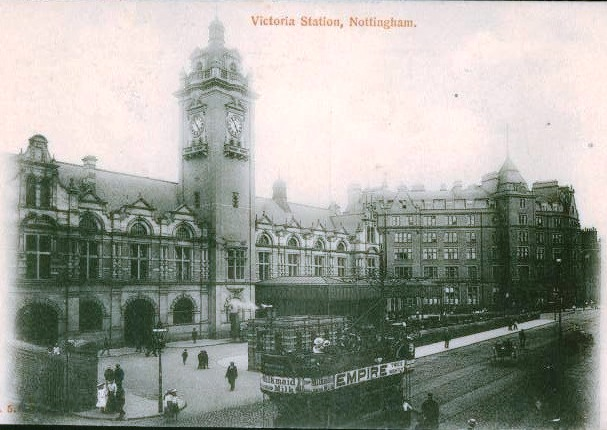
- Tram passing Nottingham Victoria Railway Station

Operation
- Locale: Nottingham
- Open: 1 January 1901
- Close: 5 September 1936
- Status: Closed

Infrastructure
- Track gauge: 1,435 mm (4 ft 8 1/2 in)
- Propulsion system: Electric

Statistics
- Route length: 25.9 miles (41.7 km)

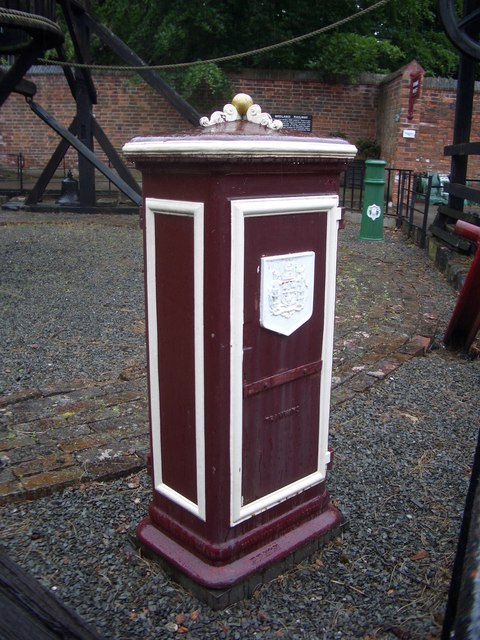
Nottingham Corporation Tramways junction box at Nottingham Industrial Museum

Nottingham Corporation Tramways was formed when Nottingham Corporation took over the Nottingham and District Tramways Company Limited, which had operated a horse and steam tram service from 1877.

== Nottingham Corporation Tramways ==
=== 1898 – Planning ===
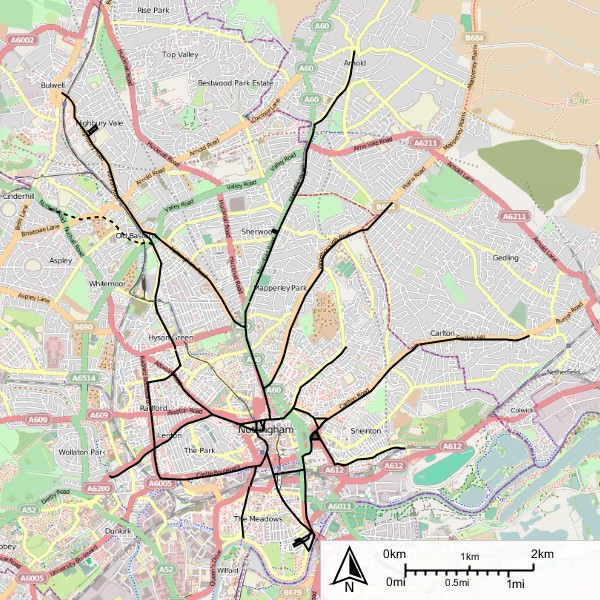
Map of the greatest extent of Nottingham Corporation Tramways

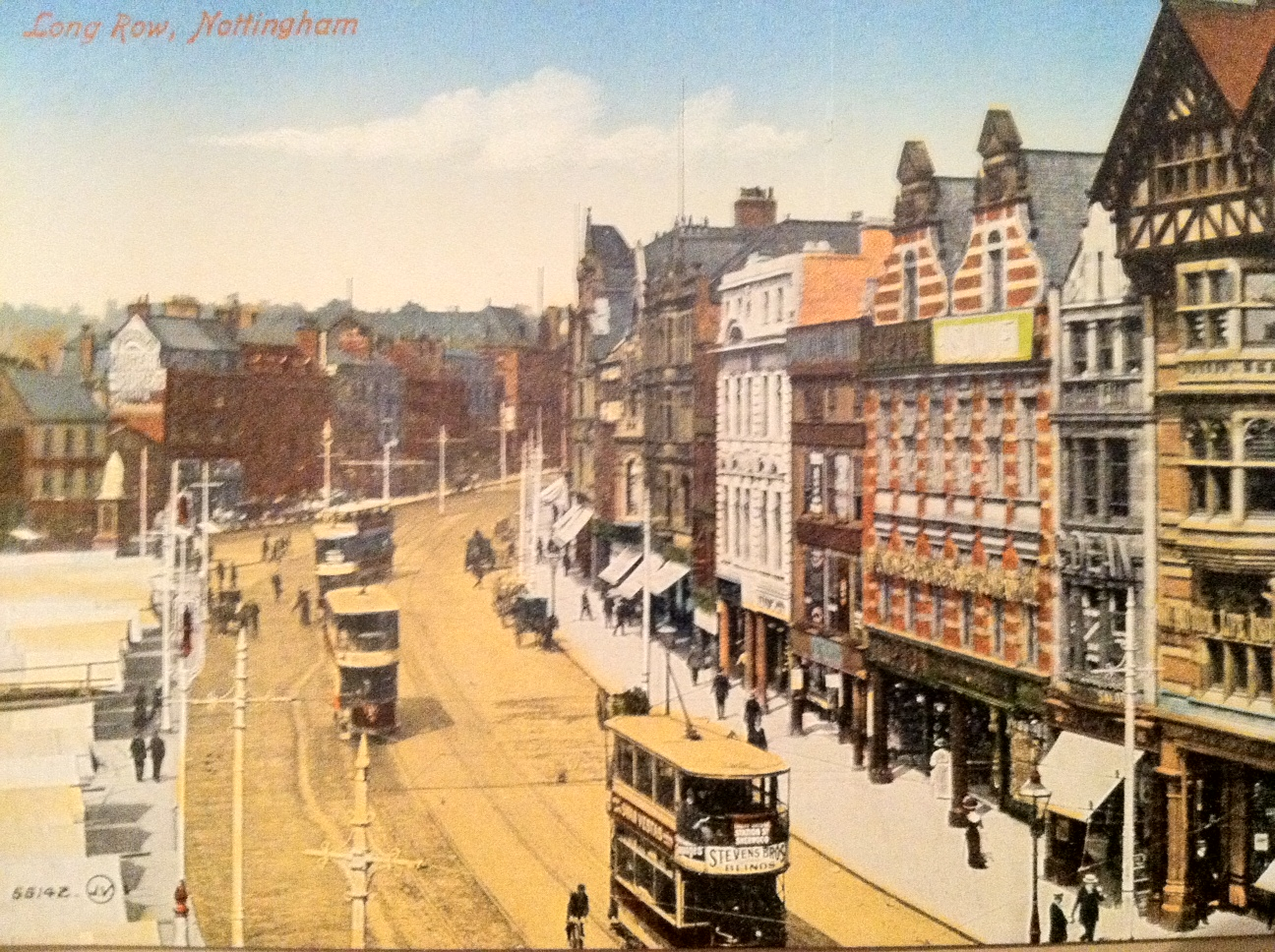
Long Row, Nottingham

In the early part of the year a deputation from Nottingham Corporation visited the cable-operated tramway system at Edinburgh and the overhead electric systems at Bristol and Dover, with the result that on 28 March the Tramways Committee recommended to the city council that the proposed electric tramways should be operated on the overhead electric system. At an estimated cost of £425,000 (equivalent to £47,800,000 in 2025),, electric tramways were proposed as follows:

1. Market Place to Trent Bridge via Arkwright Street.
2. From tramway 1 via Greyfriar Gate or Canal Street, continuing via Castle Boulevard, Lenton Boulevard, Radford Boulevard and Gregory Boulevard to Mansfield Road.
3. From tramway 2 via Wilford Road and the Victoria Embankment to Trent Bridge.
4. Market Place to Winchester Street, Sherwood, via King Street/Queen Street, Milton Street and Mansfield Road.
5. From tramway 4 via Woodborough Road to Mapperley, Porchester Road.
6. Along Parliament Street, what is now King Edward Street, St Ann's Well Road and The Wells Road to Woodborough Road.
7. Market Place to Bulwell Market Place via Chapel Bar, Derby Road, Alfreton Road, Radford Road and Vernon Road.
8. Upper Parliament Street and Market Street.

Powers for these were granted in the Nottingham Corporation Act 1899.

Certain fare reductions were made during March and, as a result, the bus service connecting the Basford tram service with Bulwell was curtailed at Bulwell Market Place. Suggestions for a bus service to Sneinton were turned down, but in October, following further representations, a service was instituted between Thurland Street, near the Market Place, and Carlton Road Brickyard via Pelham Street, Hockley and Sneinton Street. Six buses were purchased second-hand from Glasgow for this service. The service immediately attracted competition and three privately owned buses commenced operation over the route within a few days of its inception.

On 1 February, J. Aldworth commenced office as Tramways Manager, a position he was to hold for 30 years. Previously he had been Manager of the Douglas, Isle of Man, Tramways, and he succeeded A. Baker on the latter being appointed Chief Officer of the London County Council Tramways.

A further investigation into car design, type of traction and the method of current collection was made by the City Engineer, Arthur Brown, and the Electrical Engineer during a visit to New York and Boston. They confirmed that the overhead electric system would have to be used, although the conduit current collection system was preferable. Tenders were invited from Westinghouse and Dick, Kerr & Co. for cars, and that of Dick, Kerr & Co. for 12 cars was accepted.

Four buses were purchased for £130 (equivalent to £15,000 in 2025) each to replace old ones operating on the Carlton Road and Musters Road services.

=== 1900 – first electric services ===
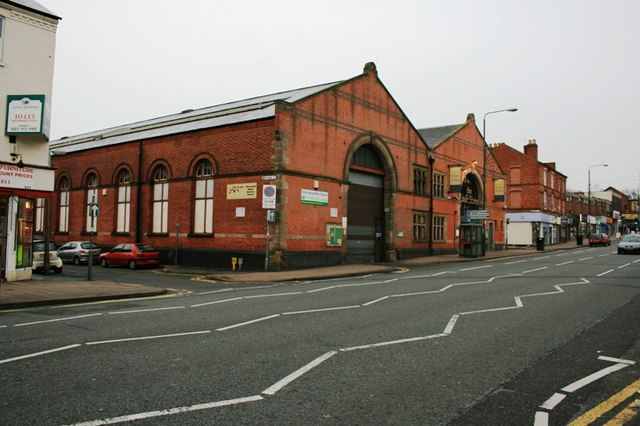
Sherwood depot

Dick, Kerr & Co. informed the department in January that unless the cars were ordered at once it would not be able to supply them before 1902 and then only at a higher price, and consequently an order was placed for 25. The relaying of the Carrington route with heavier rails (107 lb to the yard girder rails laid on six inches of concrete) and the extension to Winchester Street, Sherwood, began on 1 June. Work on the Sherwood Depot had commenced some weeks previously.

In May, horse-drawn omnibuses were withdrawn from the St Peter's Square to Musters Road service and placed on a new service between St Peter's Square and Lenton Boulevard, the fare being 2d. Five months later the service was extended to the Radford Boulevard/Hartley Road junction at Radford. Negotiations were opened for the purchase of the ten omnibuses of a Mr. Mann but these negotiations fell through, and two new ones were purchased from James Hudson of London for the opening of a service to Sneinton.

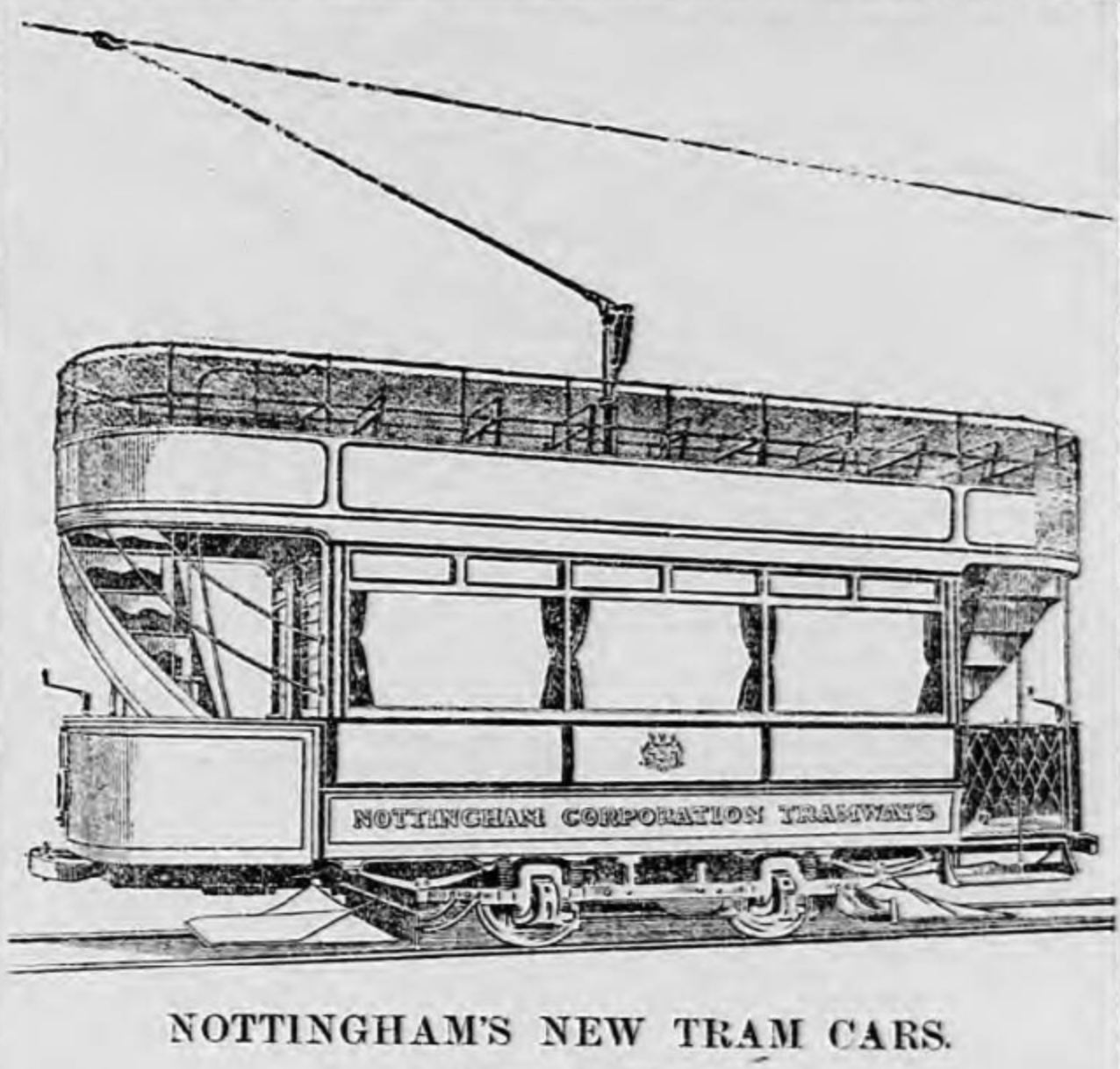
Nottingham's New Tram Cars, from Nottingham Evening Post of 17 October 1900

In October, the first nine electric trams arrived in Nottingham and were assembled at Sherwood Depot. By November, only one, no. 4, was completed, and this made its trial run on 17 November loaded with three tons of sand to represent the weight of a full load of passengers; the journey into Nottingham was quite successful, but trouble was experienced on its return when climbing Queen Street.

The destination indicator on the cars was a square ended box that pivoted on its ends, one side being painted "Sherwood" the other "Market Place". It is believed that subsequently some cars had "Basford" and "Bulwell" painted on the other sides.

The delay in completing the cars was so great that in December a notice had to be served on Dick, Kerr to complete them within seven days and, as a result, the work was done. In the meantime an order had been placed with Westinghouse for ten cars for the Trent Bridge section and, shortly afterwards, orders were placed for a further ten cars and ten bogie cars. B.T.H. were awarded contracts for six cars and six bogie cars, all to be delivered by the end of May.

1900 also saw the discontinuance of the prepaid discount tickets, and the first year of non-operation on Christmas Day.

From September, horse drivers and conductors were awarded five days' holiday per annum and alternate Sundays off duty, and electric car drivers received 5½d. per hour (equivalent to £2.43 in 2025) for a six-day week averaging 62 hours, with an increase to 6d. per hour (equivalent to £2.66 in 2025) after the first year; electric car conductors were awarded 4d. per hour, increasing to 4½d. after the first year, and to 5d. after the second.

=== 1901 – expansion ===
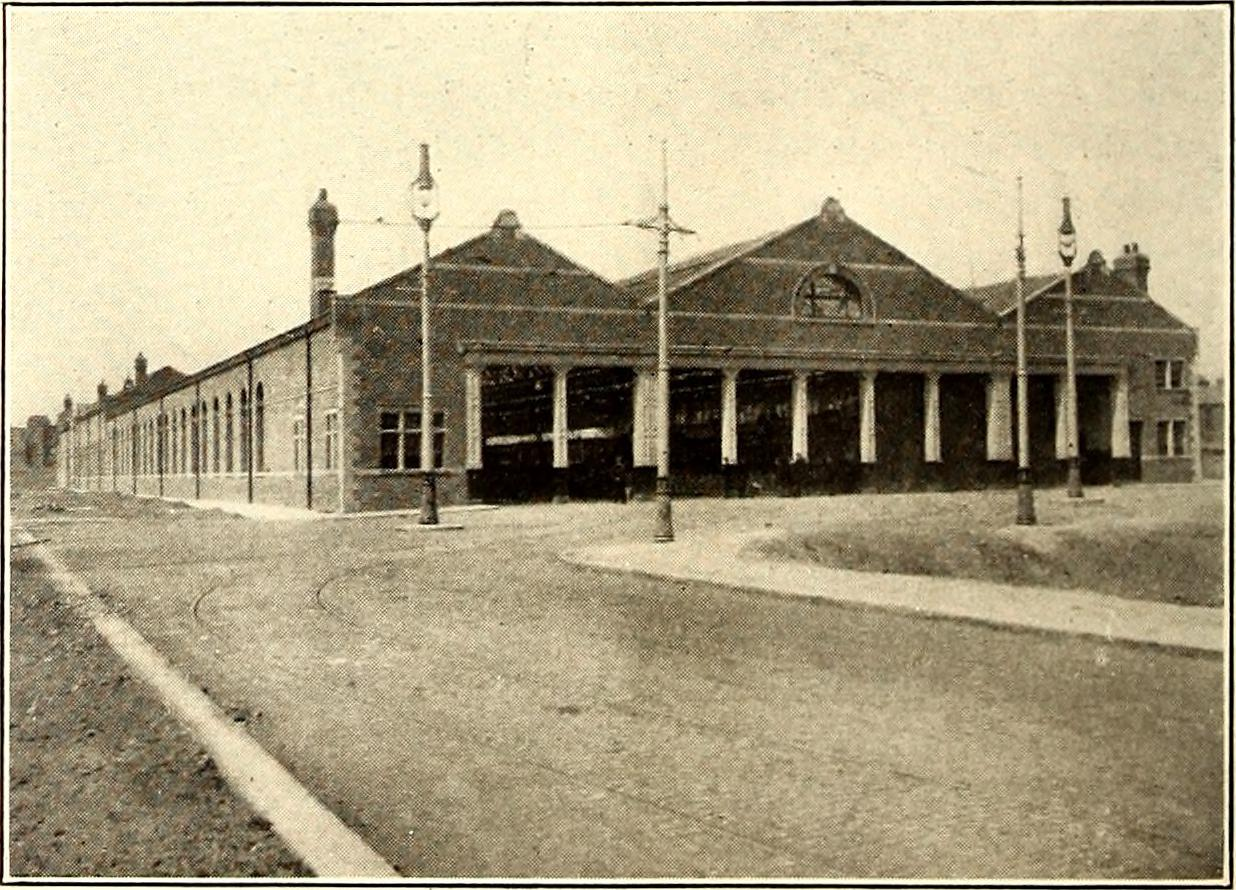
The depot at Bulwell

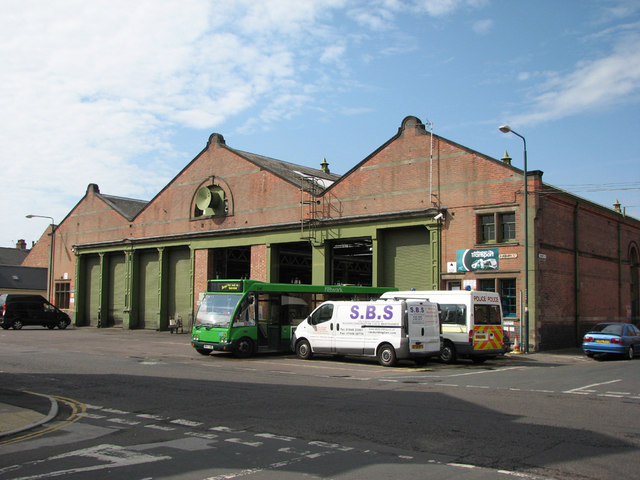
Trent Bridge Tram depot opened on 14 September 1901

Following the sanctioning of the Sherwood route by the Board of Trade on 16 December 1900, a service commenced on 1 January, workmen then being transferred to the laying of the track on the Bulwell section, starting from the outer terminus. This service was a great success from the start, a five-minute frequency increasing to three minutes at peak periods, and the fare for the journey of just over two miles was 2d.

A request for a connecting omnibus service from St Andrew's Church to Porchester Road at Mapperley until the tram service was opened was not granted.

By 23 April, new lines had been laid down Wheeler Gate, connecting for the first time the northern and southern sections, while work had commenced on relaying the Trent Bridge and Station Street sections. At this time a new electric line was laid from Bulwell as far as Gregory Boulevard at Hyson Green, which was some distance nearer the city than the Old Basford horse tram terminus. Omnibuses provided a service connecting with the horse trams while the old rails were pulled up, thus continuing the service to Basford, and on 17 April horse trams commenced operating from Gregory Boulevard to Bulwell Market over the new rails. As further new rails were laid, so the Bulwell end of the service expanded, while the Nottingham end grew shorter. On completion of this work and the depot at Bulwell in June, a through horse tram service was inaugurated on 29 June. This did not last long, for electric cars superseded the horse trams on 23 July, a week after the Board of Trade inspection, the through fare being 3d., with intermediate 1d. and 2d. fares. Electricity at this time was 1½d. per Board of Trade Unit.

Some delay was being experienced in obtaining new trams due to the large orders in hand from all over the country, and it was thought that the start of the electric car service to Bulwell would have to be postponed. Fortunately, 16 cars numbered 10 to 25, identical with the first cars except for the three-board type indicators, arrived in July, number 13 making a trial trip to Bulwell on 8 July.

On Saturdays all 25 cars were needed in service and short workings of the Bulwell service were operated between the Market Place and Hyson Green, and to the old horsecar terminus at Church Street, Basford; the service was well patronised, overcrowding being commonplace. The receipts for the Bulwell services for the first week in August were £1,115 (equivalent to £118,491 in 2025) compared with £318 (equivalent to £33,794 in 2025) the previous year.

At a city council meeting in May, new electric routes were proposed to Arnold, Hucknall, Carlton, Kimberley, Beeston, Stapleford and to other places in the county, but it was agreed not to construct outside the city boundary for the time being. In July it was decided to obtain powers for the building of the Hartley Road section.

By August 1901 the Arkwright Street and Station Street relaying was well under way, together with the building of a new depot at Trent Bridge, comprising 11 roads with accommodation for 80 cars. For a short period the Trent Bridge horse tram service was cut into two parts while the Midland Railway strengthened their bridge under Carrington Street; the bridge over the adjacent canal was rebuilt at the same time. A further 32 cars of the original type were delivered, but with 2x35 h.p. motors instead of 2x25 h.p. motors.

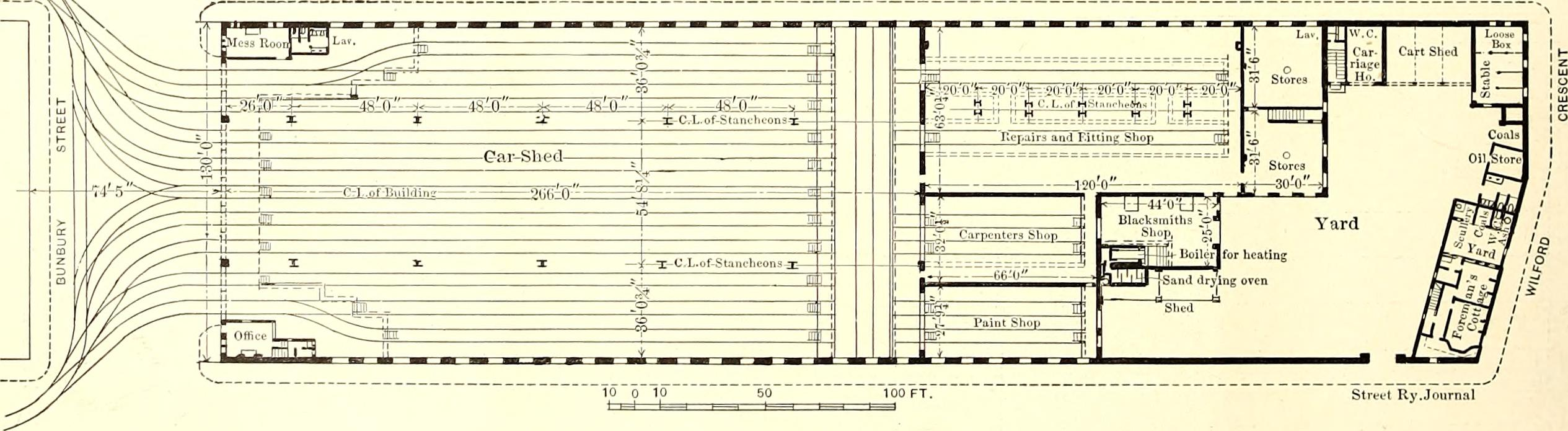
The layout of the depot at Trent Bridge

The council meeting held in September brought forth many new tramway proposals, of which the following were adopted: the conversion of the Forest Road line to electric traction (this had been left out of the original Bill), a line along Victoria Embankment from Trent Bridge to Wilford Bridge, and a line to Sneinton.

The Nottingham Corporation Act 1902 gave powers for the Forest Road line and for a number of short lengths of tramway, principally in the Market Place, to link up constructed or authorised tramways. It also gave powers for the corporation to operate motor omnibuses in connection with any tramway either during a period when it was impracticable to operate tramcars or as extensions. The layout in the Market Place caused much argument, and one suggestion was for a gyratory system, single line, that every car would have to negotiate when passing through the Market Place.

Owing to a decrease in the number of passengers carried, it was found necessary at this time to curtail the Sherwood Rise omnibus service to operate between Basford and Mansfield Road, and, in October, vehicles were transferred from this service to operate on services to Sneinton and Carlton Road.

September also saw two further batches of new trains arrive. The first numbered 58 to 67, were ordered from the British Electric Tram Car Company, but were built by G.F. Milnes & Co., of Hadley, Shropshire. They were open-topped cars with reversed stairs, had 21E trucks, B.T.H. controllers and 2x30 h.p. Westinghouse motors. The second batch, numbered 68 to 77, were open-topped reversed-stair cars with Brill 22E maximum-traction bogies; the bodies were built by G. F. Milnes, the controllers were B.T.H. and they had 2x30 h.p. Westinghouse motors.

Trent Bridge Depot was completed by 14 September, with lines leading to it along Turney Street and Pyatt Street, and while the relaying was taking place junctions were put in at Trent Bridge and Station Street for the London Road line, although the Bill for this had not yet gone before Parliament.

A start was made in October on the construction of the St Ann's Well Road section, this being the first new electric line, the others having all been either conversions of, or extensions to, horse tram routes. Authorisation was given for the route to be continued to Mapperley, via The Wells Road, but, for the time being only as far as Coppice Road (now Ransom Road) was to be built. The construction of this line brought forth a protest from Bamford's, the omnibus proprietors, alleging loss of receipts. Earlier in the year, shortly after the opening of the first electric car route, the council had been asked if they would consider the purchase of Mann's Omnibus, Horse and Carriage Company Limited, but this was not proceeded with.

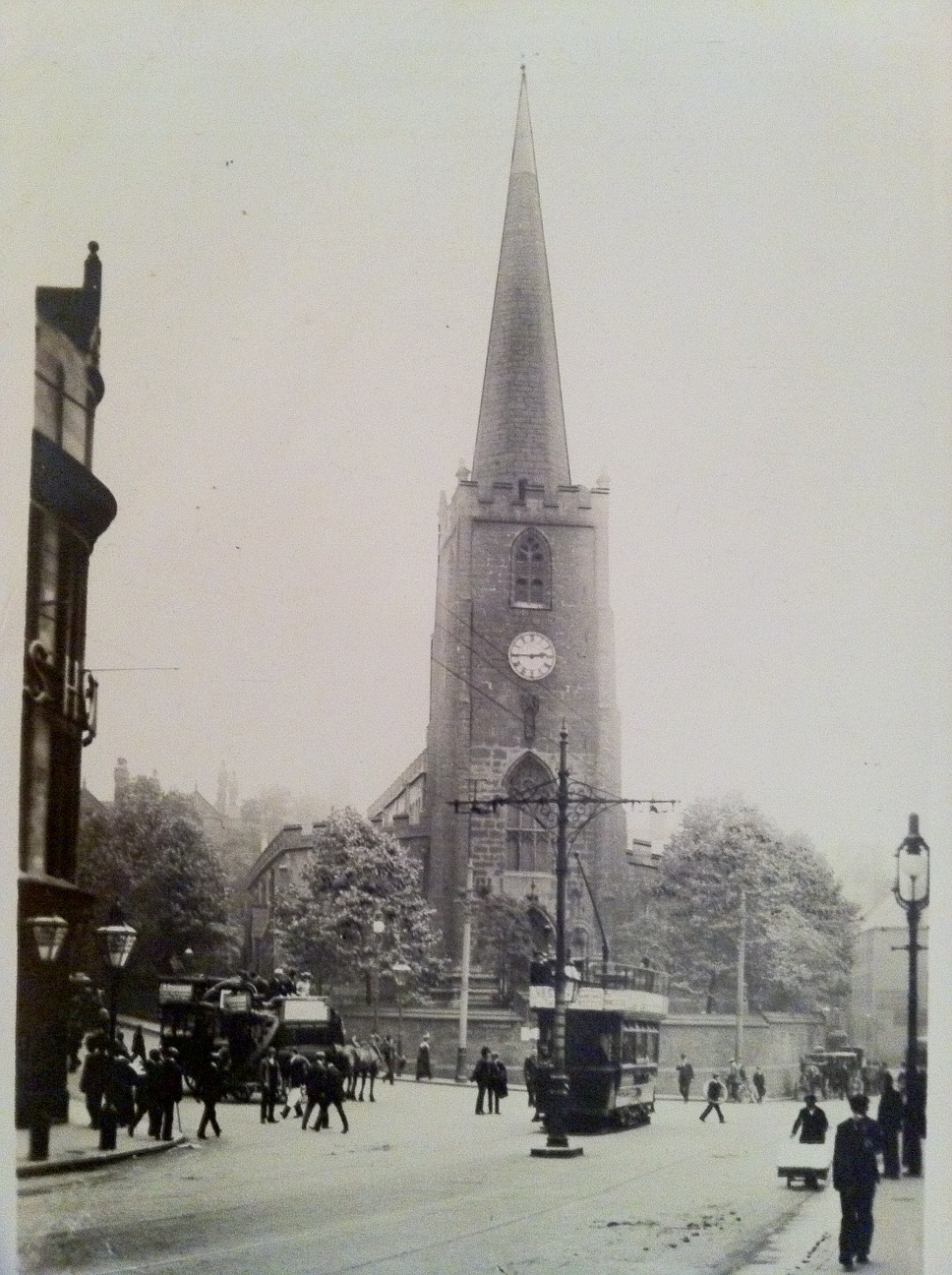
Tram on Wheeler Gate by St. Peter's Church, Nottingham circa 1901

The Trent Bridge and Station Street sections were inspected and passed on 15 October, public service commencing on 21 October. The Station Street service was a continuation of the Sherwood service via the Market Place, and was the first cross-city service, but the Trent Bridge cars ran only to the Market Place, with cars every three minutes, increased to two minutes at peak times. Six cars were fitted with Tideswell's automatic lifeguards as an experiment about this time.

A public notice in the local press on 11 October contained a most ambitious proposal for a light railway between Nottingham and Derby, via Long Eaton and Draycott, together with a line from Long Eaton to Alfreton, via Stapleford, Ilkeston, Heanor and Ripley. At the same time Stapleford Rural District Council was endeavouring to persuade Nottingham Corporation to extend its electric tramways to Stapleford.

A month later another ambitious light railway proposal was put forward for a "Nottingham Suburban Light Railway", with routes to Carlton, Arnold, Hucknall and Ilkeston. Coupled with this was a scheme sponsored by Sir Bache Cunard (of liner fame) for a "Derby and Nottingham Light Railway" operating mainly on reserved track, via Beeston and Long Eaton. Owing to great opposition by the Midland Railway, both of these schemes were turned down by the Light Railway Commissioners in the following February.

In the meantime, a start was made on the construction of the route to Mapperley, via Woodborough Road.

Initially the power for the electric tramway was provided by an existing power station in Talbot Street, but the demands of the tramway required additional power. The first new power station was erected at the junction of St Ann’s Well Road and Millstone Lane. It comprised eight boilers and a chimney of 220 feet (67 m). This was under construction in December 1901 and opened shortly afterwards. As of 2022 this building is home to Depot Climbing Nottingham.

=== 1902 – New services to Lenton, St Ann's and Mapperley ===
Various suggestions were again put forward as to the layout in the Market Place, all being greatly objected to by the stallholders. One was for a line in front of the Exchange and along South Parade; another was for two large turning circles similar to those that had just been constructed at the Pier Head in Liverpool. Although both these projects had a lot of support, they were abandoned.

The Westinghouse bogie cars, nos. 68 to 77, were good riders but extremely slow, so in January number 77 was sent away and retrucked with Brill 27G trucks, receiving 4x30 h.p. Westinghouse motors at the same time, thus doubling its motive power. As a result of the improvement created, the whole class was treated similarly during the next two months.

On 12 February a trial run was made along the St Ann's Well Road section; it was inspected on 20 February and the next day public service commenced with a five-minute service to and from the Market Place. In consequence, Bamford's omnibus service was withdrawn, but after negotiations he agreed to take over the Carlton Road and the Sneinton services, together with four buses and twelve horses, but this number was later halved, only Carlton Road being involved. The horse-drawn services at that time were suffering increasing losses and it was decided to cease their operation.

The Forest Road horse tram service was discontinued on 30 April and not replaced. Cars numbered 33 and 34, which were the two surviving ones on this service, were sold to Leicester Corporation, who operated them for a further two years. Mann was approached to see if he would take over the Basford and Old Lenton services, but he was apparently not interested; the remainder of the horses and vehicles, comprising 11 buses, one old brake, one old trap, one old dray, one old cart and 60 horses, were sold for £1,335 to John Commons, who agreed to operate the Sneinton, Old Radford and Old Lenton omnibus services at existing times and fares. He further contracted for one year, commencing on 1 May, for the use of the Muskham Street stables and depot.

For the year ending 31 March, the first full year of electric car operation, a profit of £19,029 was made, of which £12,000 was contributed to the relief of the rates. Sixteen new cars were ordered from Dick, Kerr.

A trial trip to Mapperley was made on 1 May on car 57. Apparently it was a very hot day and the driver of the car said that much sand was needed to overcome the stickiness of the tar, which had melted and overflowed onto the rails from between the setts. The steepest gradient of the section was 1 in 11. Major Pringle, the Board of Trade inspector, duly inspected the approved route on 6 May and public service commenced a week later, on 13 May. This service operated via the Market Place to Trent Bridge every 12 minutes, alternating with a short working between Alexandra Park and Trent Bridge every 12 minutes. The fare between the Market Place and Mapperley was 2d., with intermediate 1d. stages. At first there was a stop on the outward journey at Cranmer Street, but this was discontinued early in 1903 because of the difficulty of restarting the cars, the hill being at its steepest at this point.

The next section of electric tramway to be completed was the Nottingham Road route, and a trial run over this section was made in car 61 on 17 June. Major Pringle was again the inspector, on 2 July, and public service commenced on 7 July, a through service being provided via the Market Place to Station Street; the fare from the Market Place was 2d., with 1d. intermediate stages.

Three further lots of cars were obtained, all being open-topped vehicles with reversed stairs. The first batch was numbered 78 to 83, built by G. F. Milnes, mounted on 21E trucks, with B.T.H. equipment and 2×30 h.p. B.T.H. motors. The second batch was also built by Milnes, but these were bogie cars mounted on 22E maximum-traction trucks, also with B.T.H. equipment and 2×30 h.p. motors; they were numbered 84 to 89 and were known as the "pony wheel bogies". The third batch was really part of the same order as cars numbered 26 to 57, being similar in every respect. At the same time two works cars were obtained; they were no. 1, a water sprinkler and line clearer, and no. 2, a snowplough. Both of these had 21E trucks and 2x35 h.p. Dick, Kerr motors.

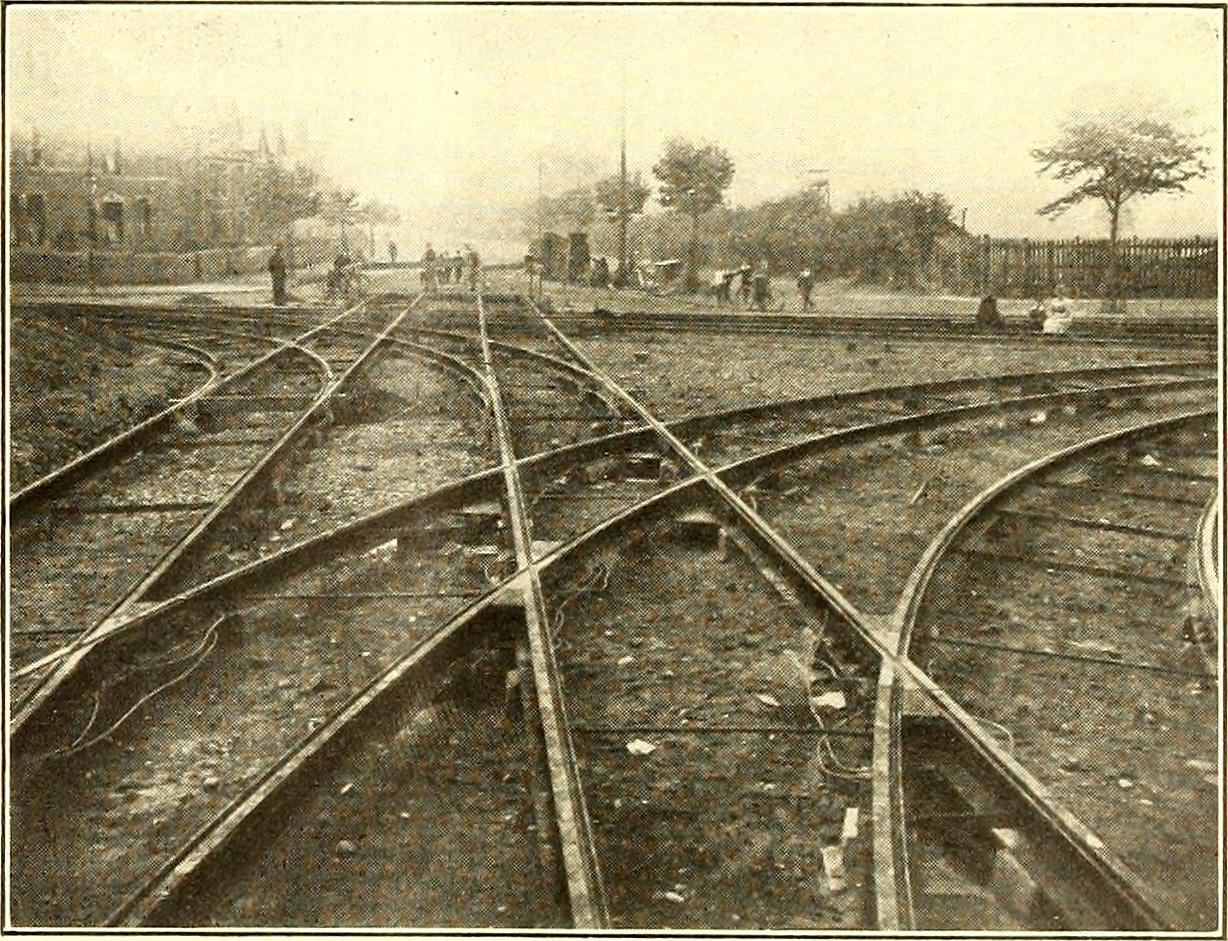
Installing the intersection at the junction of Lenton Boulevard and Derby Road. View looking south west.

In the meanwhile, work was in progress on the Lenton route, and a junction was put in at Derby Road for a proposed route to Beeston, via Derby Road and Adams Hill. Later, on 1 September, work started on the Wilford Road route.

Following a trial run over the Lenton route on 11 September, Major Pringle made an inspection on behalf of the Board of Trade on 26 September and public service commenced on 30 September. The service between Nottingham Road and Station Street was withdrawn and the cars ran from Nottingham Road, through the Market Place, and along the new section via Castle Boulevard, Lenton Boulevard and Radford Boulevard to the junction with Hartley Road. As both Greyfriar Gate and Canal Street were single line, the outward route to Lenton was via Greyfriar Gate and the inward route via Canal Street and Carrington Street.

There was a good deal of complaint at the time about the use of centre traction poles in the middle of the road, as they were alleged to be the cause of most of the traffic congestion.

Further routes were proposed at the September council meeting, including Bath Street, Carlton Road, Manvers Street, Colwick Road and Sneinton Boulevard, but only four routes, London Road, Hartley Road, Market Street and Forest Road, were applied for. In anticipation of these proposals being carried out, double junctions were laid at each end of Forest Road.

The trial run along Wilford Road took place on 31 October. The line was inspected by Major Pringle on 7 November, public service commencing the next day. Through working was inaugurated to St Ann's Well Road, but on 10 December this practice ceased, both services terminating in the Market Place.

An act of Parliament was obtained for the four short routes applied for, and an immediate start was made on the Market Street and Hartley Road sections. The construction of a line on Market Street was intended to remove congestion on Chapel Bar by making it a oneway working, and that on Hartley Road to link up Lenton Boulevard with Alfreton Road. The cost of laying the track on Market Street, including the complicated layout at the junction with Long Row, was £6,575, while Hartley Road cost £7,600.

On 17 November, the Bulwell and Trent Bridge services were joined, short working being introduced between the Market Place and Church Street, Basford, and between the Market Place and Hyson Green. It was decided to fit all cars with Tideswell life guards as a result of the success of those fitted earlier in the year.

The end of the year saw the withdrawal of free passes for members of all the council's committees.

=== 1903 – Introduction of colour-coding ===
During March the decision was taken to operate alternate cars on the Nottingham Road service only as far as Haydn Road, a practice that ceased in November of the following year.

An offer of £100 per annum was received from a syndicate for the carrying parcels on the cars, but although this offer was improved upon it was declined.

The beginning of the summer found certain service alterations taking place. A through service was provided from St Ann's Well Road to Trent Bridge for workmen during the early morning at a fare of 1d., while on summer Sundays Sherwood cars were extended to Trent Bridge.

At this time the London County Council were expanding their electric tramways, and a request received from Dick, Kerr to borrow a number of motormen from Nottingham to drive their cars before they were handed over to the London County Council was granted.

On 11 May the Nottinghamshire and Derbyshire Tramways Act 1903 was passed. This gave their trams running powers over Nottingham Corporation metals to Arnold, Beeston, Carlton and Ripley, extensions beyond the corporation routes to Sherwood, Lenton, Sneinton and Basford respectively. The Beeston line ran from the corporation line on Lenton Boulevard by way of Church Street, Gregory Street, Abbey Street and Beeston Road, continuing over fields on which University Boulevard was subsequently constructed, thence along Fletcher Road, Humber Road, High Road, Beeston Square and Chilwell Road to the Beeston boundary. The Carlton line ran via Canton Road, Carlton Hill and Main Street West to Newgate Street, while the Arnold line followed Mansfield Road, Daybrook Square, Nottingham Road and Front Street to Spout Lane (later Coppice Road). The final line proposed was from the projected line to Ripley, along Nuthall Road, thence over the railway crossing at Bobbers Mill, continuing via Alfreton Road to Bentinck Road junction, at which point it joined the existing Corporation lines.

Trial runs over the Market Street and Hartley Road sections were made on 20 July. They were duly inspected Major Pringle the next day and one-way working was brought into operation on 27 July, cars entering Market Place via Chapel Bar and leaving via Market Street The whole of the intricate layout at the bottom of Market Street was either relaid or new at this time.

The Hartley Road section completed what was known the "Boulevard Circle" and circular services commenced 30 July. Cars from Nottingham Road ran round the inner rails (Radford and Lenton) and thence back to Nottingham Road, and the St Ann's Well Road cars ran round the outer rails (Lenton and Radford), returning to St Ann's Well Road. Both operated on a six-minute frequency.

A system of coloured lights was used at night on the cars in order to distinguish the various services, as it was impossible to read the destination boards because they were not illuminated.

The colours were:

Sherwood Station Street – red
Mapperley Trent Bridge – yellow
St Ann’s Well Road Boulevards – green
Nottingham Road Boulevards – blue
Wilford Road Market Place – green
Bulwell Trent Bridge – red
Basford Market Place – white

These colours were illuminated by a light in the lower saloon immediately behind the offside bulkhead, through which there was a circular hole. The arrangement consisted of three coloured lenses on arms, which were pivoted, and by putting the lens or lenses in front of the hole the requisite light could be obtained. The side and front destination boards were painted as follows:

Sherwood Station Street – white on red
Mapperley Trent Bridge – blue on yellow
St Ann’s Well Road Boulevards – green on white
Nottingham Road Boulevards – white on blue
Wilford Road Market Place – white on green
Bulwell Trent Bridge – red on white
Basford Market Place – white on black

Following an application by residents in Sherwood for a fare reduction by extending the length of one stage, a general review of fares and stages was made, but as the average length of a 1d. stage was 1.42 miles no alterations were deemed to be necessary.

=== 1904 – Maximum speed increases to 12 m.p.h. ===
This year saw welding of rail joints for the first time, on 8 January. The Thermit process was used and its introduction followed a visit by a deputation sent to Glasgow to inspect this process.

At the February council meeting, great opposition was raised to the proposed construction of a line along Forest Road at an estimated cost of £13,000, and so the scheme was dropped. One good thing which came out of this meeting was the approval for top-covering two trams experimentally, at a cost of £85 each. Cars 33 and 94 made their appearance on 9 March with Bellamy-type roofs. This type of roof was the idea of C. R. Bellamy, the manager of Liverpool Corporation Tramways, and consisted of a box-like structure over the main saloon, without covers over the canopies at each end. On the whole they were well received and increased receipts were taken on the cars, with the result that similar modifications to further cars, believed to be four in number, were made.

Towards the end of 1903 an application had been made to the Board of Trade to revise speed limits. The findings were notified during March, a maximum speed of 12 m.p.h. being approved.

A further report on fares was made by the manager, this time on the question of cheap early facilities. He was against the issue of certain workmen's returns on account of the difficulties experienced on other systems. Consequently, return tickets at single fare where the latter exceeded 2d. were introduced.

In April, the curves at the corner of Parliament Street and Queen Street were relaid with normal rail, the extremely high check rail being removed as it was a source of danger to cyclists and other road users.

At the April council meeting proposals were made for routes in the Sneinton area, and two were adopted, one via Bath Street and Manvers Street to Colwick Road, and the other to Trent Bridge via London Road. These were incorporated in the Nottingham Corporation Act 1905. The Colwick Road route was an amended version of that previously arranged via Sneinton Road and Sneinton Hollows to Colwick Road. Owing to the extremely narrow streets in the Sneinton area, Bath Street had to be widened, and it was necessary to encroach on the cemetery to achieve this, the bodies being interred elsewhere. On Manvers Street 65 houses had to be pulled down, the main reason for this being Aldworth's strong objection to single lines with passing loops. Nearly two years were to elapse before these two routes came into being.

In May, the conductors' maximum wage was increased from 5¾d. to 6d. an hour.

At the June council meeting the question of operating along Forest Road was again raised, and this time it was finally rejected.

More peak-hour cars were put on between the Market Place and Hyson Green, together with other short workings. One councillor suggested that a clock be installed at Trent Bridge, to put an end to the present haphazard arrangement of guessing the time, and thus secure more regular running. The motion was adopted.

A proposal was accepted that the Basford terminus should be moved from its present position at Church Street to Lincoln Street, put into operation in February 1906.

Another motion carried at the meeting was for trams to have full topcovers instead of the Bellamy type. Car 8 was the first car to be so treated and all the Bellamy-type roofed cars were fully topcovered by 1908.

In July, agreement was reached for children under three years of age to be carried free of charge, while from three until their tenth birthday they would be carried at half the adult fare where this exceeded 1d.

A proposal was made to apply to Parliament for legal powers to construct a line along Canton Road, but as a similar scheme had been included in the Nottinghamshire and Derbyshire Tramways Company Bill, this was amended to a proposal to construct connecting lines comprising a single line along Handel Street and curves into Canton Road from Bath Street.

Powers were also sought at this time for the operation of motorbuses, and, in November, the Brush Traction Electric Engineering Company of Loughborough was approached to see if it were willing to operate two of its motorbuses in Nottingham for a trial period of three months. This it declined to do.

In November, Hucknall Urban District Council suggested the construction of lines from Hucknall to link with the Nottingham lines at Bulwell, but nothing further was heard of the proposal.

=== 1905 ===
The opening of the new Midland Railway Station on Carrington Street led to the old one on Station Street being closed, with the consequent loss of much tramway traffic on Station Street. The Great Northern Railway had already vacated their London Road Station for the more commodious Victoria Station in 1902, so the service of cars between Sherwood and Station Street was reduced, only alternate cars running along it, the others being directed along Arkwright Street to Trent Bridge.

More cars received top covers as they went into the Works for major overhaul; the Manager said that they were being top covered in Trent Bridge Works at the cost of £60 per car (equivalent to £6,308 in 2025). Previously, when undertaken by an outside firm, the cost had been £80 per car (equivalent to £8,410 in 2025). The existing iron guards fitted to 32 cars were replaced by Tideswell's patent life guards.

Representations were made for the carriage of parcels on the cars, but this was not agreed to, nor was the request by various church authorities that tram services on Sunday mornings should be suspended.

In November, agreement was given for the replacement of existing ticket punches by a type that would register more accurately.

The Nottingham Corporation Act 1905 repealed the 1902 act relating to the running of motor omnibuses, but gave generally similar powers in its place, including the use of animal or mechanical power, the latter including battery-driven vehicles.

=== 1906 ===
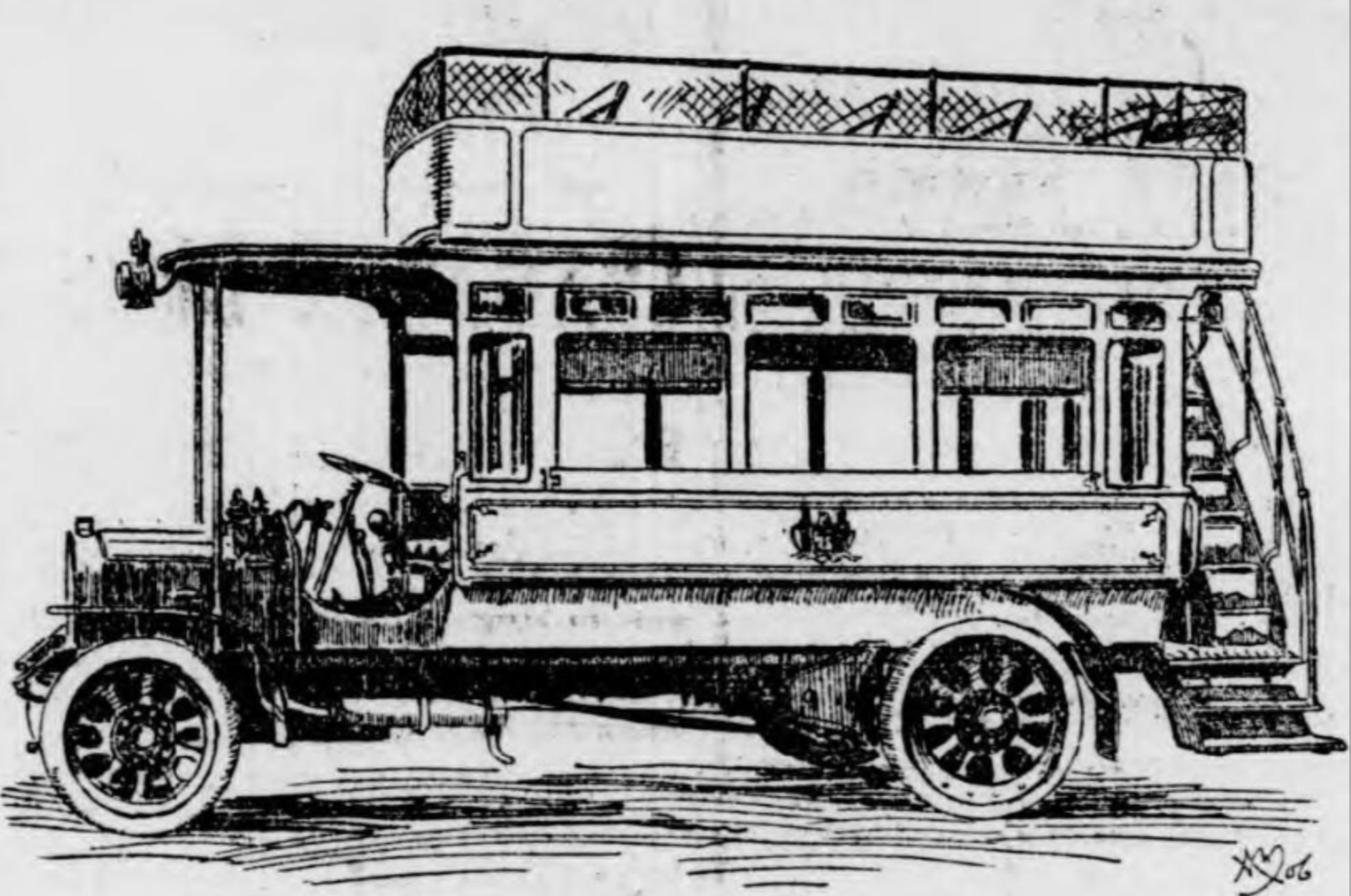
Motor bus by Thorneycroft and Company, ordered by Nottingham Corporation Tramways in 1906

During the previous year inquiries had been made of other municipalities as to their experience in the operation of motor buses, principally with a view to motorbus operation on the Carlton Road service, as Bamford was under no obligation to continue his service of omnibuses. As a result, three Thorneycroft double-deckers were ordered for early delivery following Bamford's withdrawal earlier in the year. Bamford had agreed to take over the tenancy of the Muskham Street stables from 25 March in succession to Common's Nottingham Carriage Company, which had gone into liquidation, but, following the refusal of the West Bridgford Urban District Council to grant licences for operation in their area, Bamford was released from his agreement.

On 26 March the motorbus service between the Market Place and the Crown Hotel, Carlton Road commenced operation. Two vehicles were required for the normal operation of the service, the third one being kept in reserve at the depot built on spare land adjoining Trent Bridge Depot. At first the service was operated Monday to Saturday only, but it was shortly afterwards increased to daily operation; time and a quarter was agreed upon for Sunday work. It was also agreed that after 12 months' service each employee should be granted six days' paid holiday.

The question of traction poles in the centre of the road came before the April committee meeting, as apparently they were becoming troublesome. It was decided to replace them by side poles and brackets, or side poles and span wires, as the opportunity occurred.

At the June council meeting, the fitting of new and more powerful motors was approved for cars 1 to 25, as, with their weaker motors, they frequently lost time and hindered the cars behind. 35 h.p. motors were obtained from Dick, Kerr and the 25 h.p. ones were returned in part payment.

The laying of track for the Colwick Road service along Bath Street, Manvers Street and Colwick Road, together with that for the London Road service, via Pennyfoot Street, Plumptre Square and London Road to Trent Bridge, commenced on 22 August 1906. Grooved wire was used for the overhead line.

=== 1907 – New services to Colwick Road and Wilford Road ===
The first trial car was run over both the above routes on 6 March. Major Pringle inspected them on behalf of the Board of Trade on 13 March and, following the official opening of the Colwick Road section the next day, a service commenced between the Market Place and Colwick Road during the afternoon. The London Road route opened the following day, 15 March, this route being linked up with the one to Wilford Road. At the same time the Sherwood Station Street service was extended via London Road and Pennyfoot Street to Colwick Road. A week later the Colwick Road and Basford services were linked together.

New cars were purchased from Milnes Voss for these extensions, numbered 106 to 115, and they entered service on 28 March. These vehicles were a new departure for Nottingham, having normal staircases and top-covered bodies. The trucks were Mountain and Gibson 2IEM type, having M&G equipment and controllers. In addition to the usual slipper brake, hand brake and rheostatic brake, they had a magnetic runback brake. All had with wooden block slipper brakes, as were several of the earlier cars, and a fitter had to be kept in the Market Place fitting new blocks every two or three journeys for they quickly wore out, particularly on the Mapperley service.

The drivers liked these wooden brake blocks, saying that they gave a good purchase on the rail, but this class of car on the whole was greatly disliked and, shortly afterwards, the wooden blocks were replaced by cast-iron ones.

The Hockley portion of the motorbus route had been causing some difficulty and in March the service was altered to operate between Milton Street – Parliament Street junction and Thorneywood Lane junction on Carlton Road, via Parliament Street and Bath Street.

In April 1907, barely a month after it had started, the Station Street to Colwick Road service was discontinued, and the cars from the Sherwood to Station Street route continued via London Road to Trent Bridge. This meant that all cars from Sherwood ran to Trent Bridge, alternating via Arkwright Street and via London Road. At about this time the terminal line at Trent Bridge was moved from the centre of the road to the kerbside outside Hickling's Cafe, and a new terminal line was put in for the London Road cars. For the first four or five weeks of running all London Road cars had to use the existing Trent Bridge terminus, causing much congestion.

Colwick Road residents objected greatly to the loss of their Station Street service, so a circular one was introduced from Colwick Road to Colwick Road, via Station Street, the Market Place and Bath Street, alternate cars going different ways. This service also proved unremunerative and was withdrawn in October.

Fares at this period averaged 1.6 miles for 1d.

Top covering of cars proceeded at a steady rate. By May 1906, 24 cars had been dealt with and work on a further 12 was in hand. A year later, in June 1907, 12 more were fitted. In November, the fitting of a sanding device on all cars at a cost of 55/- per car (equivalent to £290 in 2025) was agreed upon.

The centre poles on Derby Road were replaced by side poles and span construction at a cost of £350-£375; Milton Street was similarly treated later in the year. This work was extended to include Mansfield Road, Castle Boulevard and Lenton Boulevard early in 1908, these schemes costing some £1,547 (equivalent to £161,000 in 2025).

=== 1908 ===
Agreement was reached with the Nottinghamshire and Derbyshire Tramways Company for the construction of a line within the city from Cinderhill to connect with the existing Corporation lines at Basford, and in return the company were to transfer powers for their lines within the city to the corporation. In April a bill was passed through Parliament authorising the corporation to take over the powers for three of the company's routes, namely, to Beeston, Arnold (a continuation of the Sherwood route) and Carlton.

The Carlton route, as sanctioned to the company, was for single line with passing loops, a type of construction not favoured by the corporation, and during the construction of the various routes within the city, endeavours had always been made to have property demolished in order to widen the roadways, making them suitable for double track. A new Bill was therefore introduced by the corporation to authorise a double line to Carlton, but owing to the dissolution of Parliament it was not passed until 1910.

Only a few days after their introduction in March 1906, the motorbuses had started to give considerable mechanical trouble; split pins dropped out of the steering gear and out of the wheels, while blocked petrol supply pipes were a continual source of delay. Some repairs were carried out by the drivers, but usually the fitter employed on this work would bring out the third bus as a replacement. As time went by the vehicles became more troublesome and often the service had to be maintained by one bus because mechanical work was being carried out on the other two. It was not unusual for one bus to go out two or three hours late to enter service, and on one occasion the crew of one vehicle waited five hours after a breakdown for the second bus in service to work its last journey and tow them in.

In April, the committee were informed that considerable expenditure was needed to keep these vehicles in service and that it was not possible to maintain them satisfactorily, whereupon it was decided to ask Seldon Brothers, Wentworth's, and W. Bamford if any of them would be willing to provide omnibuses for the service, pending construction of the tramway. Bamford agreed to the proposal that he should operate between the top of King Street and the Crown Inn on Carlton Road, via Coalpit Lane (later Cranbrook Street), on a 20-minute frequency at a fixed charge of 9d. per mile; receipts were collected by a Corporation conductor, but the driver was provided by Bamford's. The last day of motorbus operation was 15 June. After withdrawal, two of the vehicles were converted into tower waggons.

A further ten cars, numbered 116 to 125, were obtained during the year and during their life proved popular with the crews. They were top-covered, with normal stairs, and bodies built by the United Electric Car Company of Preston. They were fitted to Brill 21 E trucks and had two 40 h.p. Dick, Kerr motors with Dick, Kerr controllers and equipment, and B.T.H. magnetic slipper brakes. In May, one of these, no. 121, was demonstrated to the committee, showing the action of the "run back" preventer and of the combined magnetic and mechanical track brake. At a later date this car was involved in an incident. It was foggy at the time, and both driver and conductor alighted near the top of Derby Road to find their whereabouts. On returning to their car they found that it had run away backwards down the hill to Gregory Street, where it collided with another car, knocking the latter into some gardens.

In August the removal of the centre poles along Alfreton Road was agreed to and, on account of heavy losses, the Carlton Road omnibus service was reduced to a half-hourly frequency.

=== 1909 ===
Little development took place during this year. The top covering of cars continued and, by October, 72 out of 125 cars had been so fitted. The covers cost just over £80 each and at this period were being bought from the United Electric Car Company of Preston.

Until 1909 the fare for children under 12 was for two children to travel with one adult ticket or for one child to ride two adult stages. This system had come in for a certain amount of criticism, the outcome of which was the introduction of children's tickets in January. Children under 15 years of age were supplied with books of 30 tickets, each book costing 1/3d. Each ticket was available for one adult 1d. stage and had to be handed to the conductor in exchange for a section ticket.

A suggestion was made by the Public Parks Committee that the success of the proposed recreation ground and golf, course at Bulwell Hall Estate would depend on the extension of the Bulwell tramway service to the entrance to the Estate. This proposal was found to be costly, as increased generating equipment would be required, and the idea was not proceeded with.

In November, alterations to wages and working conditions took place. Spare conductors were granted 1/ per day, provided that they attended at the depot and were not required. A proposed reduction in working hours per week from 63 to 56 for six days was turned down by a ballot of the men. Cleaners' pay was increased from 5½d. to 6d. an hour and the hours reduced from 9½ to 9 each night for a six-night week.

=== 1910 – Carlton Road relaid ===
A change in the supplier of tickets took place during April, following a request for quotations from a number of printers. The new contractors were the C.A.S. Punch and Ticket Company Limited of London and this firm supplied the bulk of the tickets for 20 years.

The Nottingham Corporation Act 1910 authorised the borrowing of money in order to purchase a further ten cars for use on increased services and on the new Carlton Road service. Before ordering, a visit was made to West Ham to inspect a new type of car in service there. During the visit a Johannesburg gentleman placed at the party's disposal a motor omnibus for demonstration.

Notts. County's new football ground was opened in August and, in order to assist in operating cars to and from the ground, a siding line to hold either eight bogie or ten four-wheel cars was constructed.

On 31 August a start was made on laying the Carlton Road track to the revised specifications, this being completed up to Thorneywood Lane (now Porchester Road) by early December. Major Pringle inspected it on 16 December at 12.30 p.m. and at 1.30 p.m. a regular service was running to and from the Market Place. This track contained an interlaced section of approximately 200 yards. On the same day a fifteen-minute service was instituted between the Midland Station and Colwick Road; some three years later this was linked with the Carlton service. The inauguration of the tramcar service resulted in the withdrawal of the omnibus service operated by Bamford on behalf of the corporation.

Requests were continually being made for various fare alterations, and these resulted in the decision in December to introduce 1½d., 2½d., and 3½d. fares. Following an experiment with a new type of punch, 300 were hired from the Ticket Punch and Register Company Limited of London at 9/- per annum.

=== 1911 – Fleet increases to 100 vehicles ===
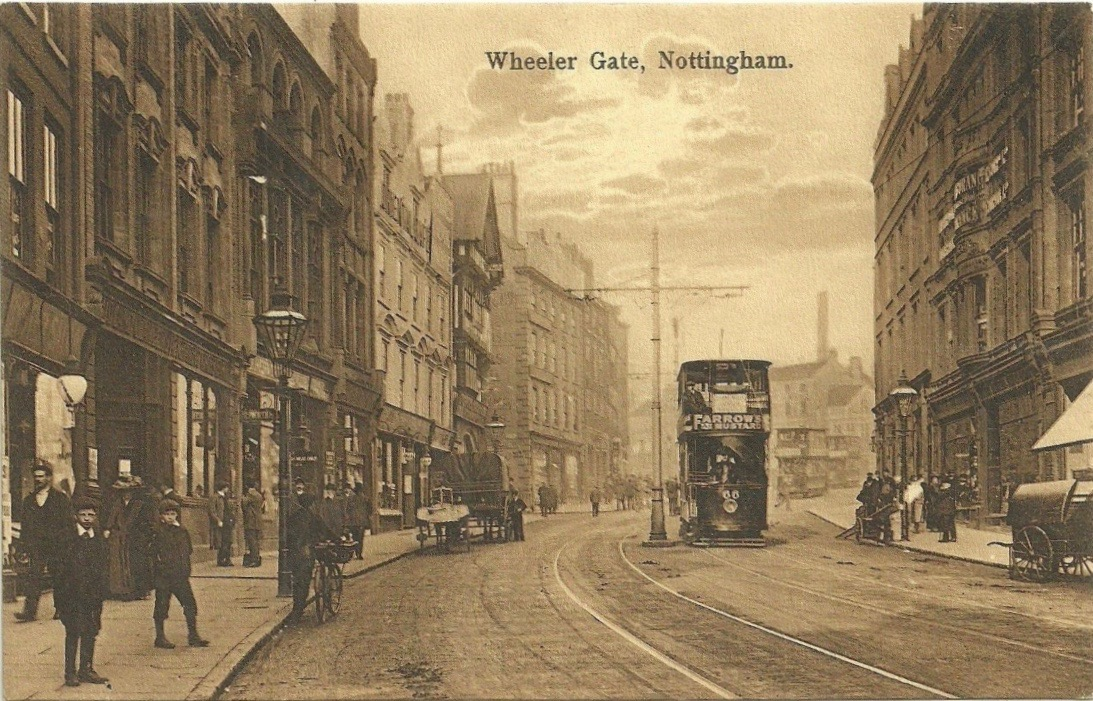
Nottingham Corporation Tramways car 66 descending Wheeler Gate, ca. 1910

The top covering of cars was carried out continuously between June 1910 and March 1911, a further 10 cars being so treated, bringing the total to 100. 14 more top covers were then purchased, four for bogies and ten for single-truck cars. Eight sets of magnetic brakes were also ordered to replace the mechanical type on the 1907 cars.

Owing to an increase in electricity consumption by the cars the Manager recommended that meters should be fitted to each one. The offer of a Birmingham firm to supply these was accepted, on condition that if the consumption had not decreased by at least 500 units at the end of the first year, the meters would be removed and the cost refunded. A subsequent agreement reduced the period to six months following the conclusion of a maintenance agreement between the corporation and the firm. During the trial period consumption did decrease, following which a sum was set aside to be shared between those drivers and their conductors who used least current on their cars.

The 126 to 135 batch of cars came in December. They were top-covered cars with normal stairs, built by the United Electric Car Company at their Preston works. They had six side windows in the lower saloon and three in the upper saloon, two 40 h.p. Dick, Kerr 9.A.2 interpole motors and Dick, Kerr controllers and equipment.

To celebrate the coronation of King George V and Queen Mary on 22 July a decorated and illuminated tramcar was run.

=== 1912 ===
In February E. L. Fleetwood of London requested a licence to operate motorbuses between St Peter's Square and West Bridgford, but the granting of this was deferred pending consideration of the introduction of a joint service between the Market Place and West Bridgford. It was, however, decided that as there was sufficient vehicular traffic already using Arkwright Street and a frequent tramcar service operating as far as Trent Bridge, the licence should be refused, although the corporation had no objection to a service between West Bridgford and the city side of Trent Bridge.

Bulk purchase scholars' tickets were withdrawn about March and replaced by a concession allowing children under 14 years of age to be carried over a 1d. adult stage for ½d.

After visiting Birmingham to see drivers' screens in use on the cars, six Nottingham vehicles were similarly treated. The reequipment of twenty older cars also took place, Dick, Kerr interpole motors being used.

In November, service numbers replaced colours on destinations, this being the outcome of a visit several months earlier to see similar destination number boxes in use at Liverpool.

The services were numbered:

1. Sherwood Trent Bridge.
2. Mapperley Trent Bridge.
3. Bulwell Trent Bridge.
4. Basford Colwick Road.
5. Nottingham Road Radford and Lenton.
6. St Ann’s Well Road Lenton and Radford.
7. Wilford Road London Road.
8. Carlton Road Market Place.

In September, orders were placed for top-covers for a further 12 standard cars, thus completing the topcovering of all regular service cars. The "pony wheel" bogie class never received top-covers.

No. 76 appeared late in this year with a totally enclosed top deck, there being no bulkheads. This car had no service number holders and the number "3" was painted at each end of the upper deck. These enclosed ends were not popular with the conductors for, when leaning out of the rather narrow end sliding windows to see that all passengers had boarded or alighted, their hats were knocked off unless they had taken the precaution to remove them first.

A further innovation was the fixing of transparencies on gas lamp glasses to denote stopping places.

=== 1913 ===
The 1913 Nottingham Corporation Bill proposed tramway extensions along Derby Road, via Hucknall Road to Bagthorpe Hospital, along Sneinton Road to Sneinton Dale, and from Bulwell Market to Bulwell Hall Park, together with various motorbus and trolley vehicle routes. The principal motorbus routes were in West Bridgford, i.e., via Trent Boulevard to Adbolton Grove, and a circular route via Musters Road, Chaworth Road and Loughborough Road. Others were between the tramcar terminus at Sherwood, continuing via Daybrook Square to Arnold, and along Carlton Road o Newgate Street, both of these being routes for which tramway powers had been taken over from the Nottinghamshire and Derbyshire Tramways Company. Suggestions were made that powers would probably also be required for other feeder services to tramways, such as from Mansfield Road, via Gregory Boulevard and Alfreton Road to Bentinck Road, along Forest Road, along Hucknall Road to the Bagthorpe Workhouse, via Sneinton Road to Sneinton Dale, between Bulwell Market Place and Bulwell Hall Park, and from the Mapperley tramway terminus to Spout Lane (now Coppice Road).

The subsequent act of Parliament gave general powers for motorbus operation within the city boundary.

Trolleybus powers were sought for a route from the Market Place, via Arkwright Street to Trent Bridge, and thence along the two routes proposed for motorbus operation in West Bridgford. Owing to opposition from the West Bridgford Urban District Council, the latter clause was deleted, but powers for trolleybuses were granted, including the section of route between the Market Place and Trent Bridge. The vehicles were restricted to a maximum laden weight of five tons, powers being given to enable provisional orders to be applied for on any route required.

West Bridgford Urban District Council then promoted their own Bill to operate motorbuses, but endeavoured to make a satisfactory agreement with the corporation to operate the services; eventually, after lengthy negotiations, West Bridgford commenced operation on their own account in January the following year.

The construction of the Nottinghamshire and Derbyshire Tramways Company's Ripley route began in May 1913, and it was opened in several sections, all outside the city. The section between Church Street Basford, and Cinderhill was constructed by the corporation and, after inspection by Major Pringle on 1 January 1914, through services to Ripley started. This section of the line included the only reserved track in Nottingham, ballasted sleeper track about ¼ mile long cutting off the corner between Nuthall Road and Stockhill Lane. The only corporation cars to run over this track, so far as can be ascertained, were two test cars and the inspection car and, later, about 1919, one of the Westinghouse bogie cars borrowed by the tramway company in order to try out a car of this type on their line. It is thought that this car was no. 77: the car ran all the way to Ripley, probably the only Nottingham car to do so.

Corporation tickets were issued on the company's trams between the Nottingham terminus on Parliament Street and Cinderhill, rebooking being necessary at the latter point on journeys either way. The company issued a special colliers' ld. ticket, available to colliers going to and from work in their "pit clothes", irrespective of distance. One passenger answering to this description boarded a company car on Alpine Street and asked for his ld. ticket, wanting to go to Nuthall. This placed the conductor in a quandary as he had no corresponding ticket for the corporation, but being an obliging person, he issued a ld. joint ticket which was marked "Parcel or Perambulator"! The said passenger was most insulted by this and informed the conductor so in language not too polite. When the conductor said that he could not do anything about it, the passenger's ire was so roused that he punched the conductor on the nose. Litigation ensued.

The experiment with the Birmingham type screen proved so successful that in October it was agreed to fit a further 40 suitable cars with this type, the remaining 25 to be fitted with the best kind obtainable.

An extension of the Carlton Road route from the old terminus at Thorneywood Lane to Standhill Road was commenced in the September.

=== 1914 – Extension to Carlton and along Derby Road ===
In addition to his inspection of the Cinderhill section on 1 January, Major Pringle also included the Carlton extension. Services on the latter commenced on 5 January, cars running alternately to the Market Place or to Colwick Road, via Station Street. Following the Council meeting in January, an immediate start was made with the line down the other side of Carlton Hill into Carlton. The Derby Road and Arnold extensions followed.

Construction of the Derby Road section commenced on 4 May and, at the same time a start was made on the relaying the track on Derby Road from the top (now Canning Circus) to Chapel Bar.

The Carlton section opened throughout on 14 June the cars continuing to operate alternately to the Market Place or to Colwick Road. A short working was introduced between the Market Place and Standhill Road Loop (as it was called on the timetables and on the tickets) this service shortly afterwards being allocated the letter A.

In April, quotations were received from the Daimler Company for the supply of motorbuses. An order was placed with them for two single-deckers of the 40 h.p. type fitted with Dodson 25-seat (plus three next to the driver) clerestory-roof single-deck bodies. These were to provide a service between the Derby Road tramway at Gregory Street and Dunkirk, with a l½d. through transfer ticket.

Until this time transfer tickets had not been issued, but fare revisions introduced about December 1914 included this facility. Certain reductions in workmen's fares also took place.

In May, work was completed on rebuilding the bodies of three cars, and a considerable number of others required to be fitted with steel braces. As this type of work fully committed the coachbuilders at the Works for some time, orders were placed with the United Electric Car Company for six new car bodies and with Dick, Kerr for new electrical equipment to be fitted to the six oldest cars requiring these bodies.

Two batches of new cars were obtained for the extensions built or being built, Carlton, Derby Road and Arnold. The first were numbered 136 to 145; these had vestibuled bodies with four windows on each side built by the United Electric Car Company Limited. They were mounted on Brill 21E wide wing trucks, had 2x40 h.p. Dick, Kerr motors, Dick, Kerr equipment with D.B.I. controllers and, besides the usual brakes (hand, rheostatic and runback), they had Cole, Marchint and Morley air slipper brakes. These cars were 64-seaters.

The second batch, numbered 146 to 155, had similar bodies built by the Brush Electrical Engineering Company Limited of Loughborough, mounted on Brush-built P.22 trucks and with identical equipment to the U.E.C. cars, except for 146, which had a B.T.H electromagnetic brake instead of the air slipper type. All these cars were delivered with roller blind indicators, and gradually, but with no small objection from the travelling public, this type of indicator was fitted to practically all the remaining cars.

The first car to be fitted with a new U.E.C. lower saloon was no. 16 and this appeared in service during the summer, the remaining rebuilt cars appearing shortly afterward. The fitting of top covers to these earlier cars had caused the original lower saloon frames to bow owing to the extra weight. These new saloons had normal staircases, while the existing equipment was replaced by the new Dick, Kerr 40 h.p. motors and D.B.I. controllers. The position of the track wheel was altered, and roller blind indicators were fitted.

On 25 September, the Derby Road route was complete and inspected by Major Druit. The route was pronounced be in order and a ten-minute service numbered 9 to and from the Market Place, inward via Chapel Bar and outward via Market Street was inaugurated the same day.

Construction of the Arnold extension beyond Winchester Street was then in hand and at the same time the whole of Mansfield Road between Gregory Boulevard and Sherwood Depot was relaid. Despite the outbreak of World War I, this work was completed in early December, being inspected by Major Druit on 29 December. Public service commenced on 1 January 1915.

=== 1915 – First women employed as conductresses ===
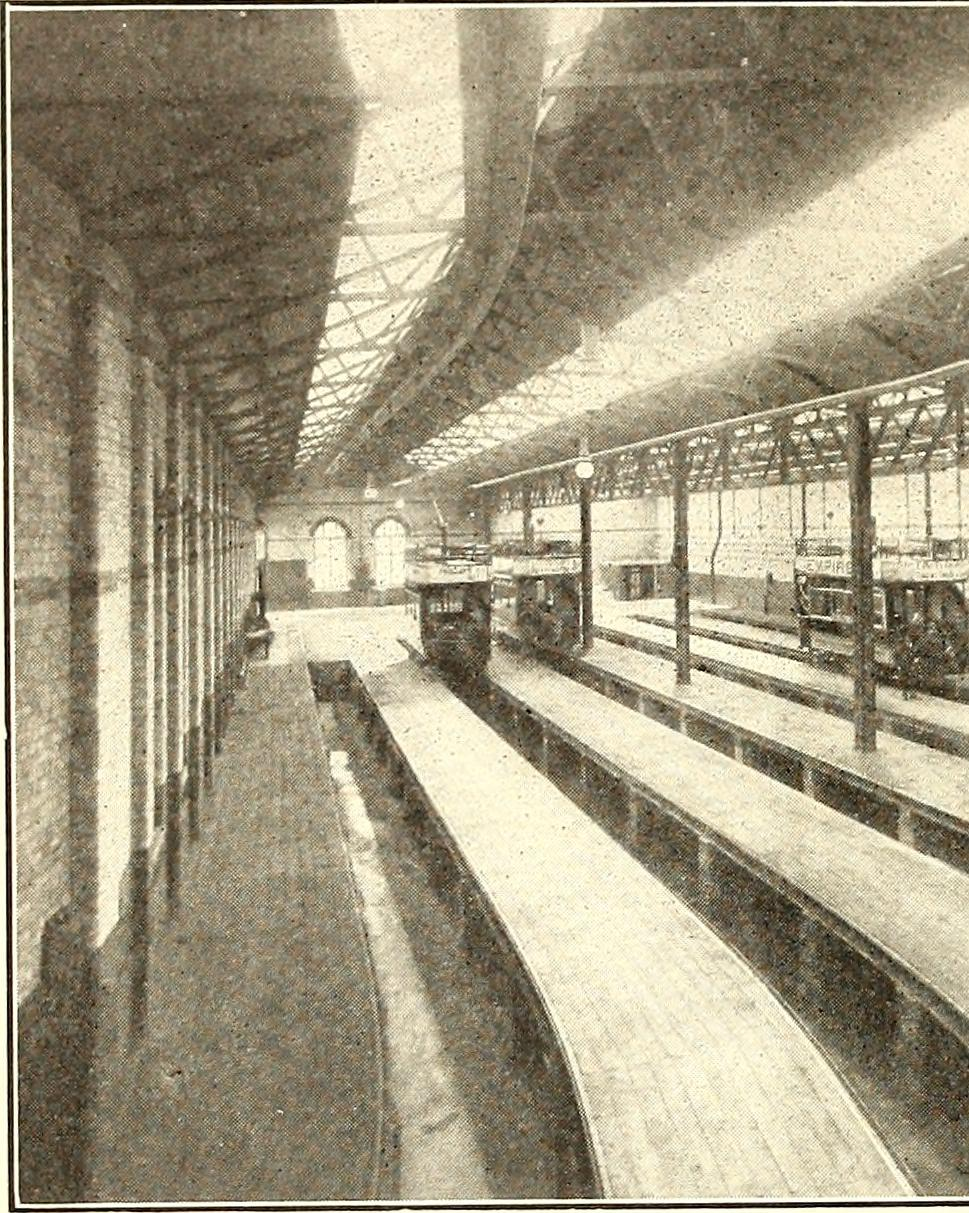
The interior of Bulwell Depot

This new service was also numbered 9, being linked with the Derby Road section and thus providing the longest run the city, all over new track. Previously, Arnold had been served by a bus service operated by John Bradhury, whose call for compensation failed. By this time many of the motormen and conductors had enlisted, so in order to operate a satisfactory service to Arnold it was necessary to reduce the frequency of the service along Wilford Road. This depleted service lasted for some 16 months.

In March, a driver dropped dead at Bulwell Depot just before he was due to take a car out. Consequently, all drivers were required to be medically examined periodically. A further noteworthy incident at Bulwell at this time occurred when an officer stationed at Bulwell Hall commandeered a tramcar standing at Bulwell Market Place to take 17 men to Victoria Station. This created quite a stir, for if such occasions occurred frequently the service would be thrown into disorder. From this time soldiers were carried at half fare, a later concession being the issue of prepaid ½d. and 1d. passes to wounded soldiers.

Owing to the war and consequent lack of materials, it was impossible to construct the tramways to Beeston as originally intended. Much of the proposed route, which was to have been along a private right of way on approximately the line of University Boulevard, had been pegged out. A three-year extension of powers to build the line was granted.

During the summer, blinds were fitted over the ends of all cars with normal staircases, so that when it rained or the sun shone directly into the driver's eyes he could pull down this blind and gain a little protection. These blinds were fitted because of complaints from drivers that they had no protection at all from the weather on cars of this type, whereas they did gain a little protection on those fitted with reversed stairs.

The number of men enlisting increased considerably, their places being taken by women employed as conductresses, the first starting about October 1915. Some 18 months later a visit was made by the Manager and others to Glasgow to see women working as tramcar drivers. They formed the opinion that this was not desirable in Nottingham. Track replacements took place during the year on the Arkwright Street, Bulwell and Mapperley sections, while the centre poles were replaced by side poles and span wires on Parliament Street and King Edward Street.

By October, traffic had fallen off considerably during the evening, the service being terminated at 11 p.m. Six months later this was amended to 10.30 p.m. because of air raid dangers, and, in October 1916, to 10 p.m.

Despite the war, the Royal Show was held at Wollaton Park in 1915, special cars being operated on the Derby Road service at a fare of 3d.

=== 1916 ===
This year marked the introduction of the 5/- change money for conductors; at first this was issued only to full service conductors.

Following the Zeppelin raid on Nottingham, a form of blackout blind was fitted to the cars, while revised Board of Trade regulations in June necessitated the fitting of side lifeguards. A further six tramcar bodies were ordered at this time from the United Electric Car Company Limited as replacements, followed by six more in October.

=== 1917 ===
Many wounded soldiers were sent to the Corporation hospital at Bagthorpe and the necessity arose for some sort of service to be provided. The production of motorbuses by the Daimler Company had ceased as far as the order placed with them in 1915 was concerned, so an approach was made to Barton Brothers of Beeston to see if they would provide a service. This they declined to do because of the labour shortage, and there the matter rested.

By May it had become apparent that there was no alternative but to revise fares to meet the increased cost of operation and particularly that of labour. The availability of workmen's fares was altered to cease after 7 a.m., but the time had to be amended shortly afterwards to 7.30 a.m. All transfer facilities were abolished after 20 May; the half-fare limit for children was altered from under 15 to under 12, and other half-fare concessions were abolished, except those for wounded soldiers. Shortly afterwards, workmen's return fares were also withdrawn. In September, lost property charges were introduced of 2d. for articles claimed within the month, plus 1d. for each additional month thereafter.

The cost to the Department for separation allowances to dependants of persons in the Forces was £400 (equivalent to £24,000 in 2025) per week at this time.

=== 1918 ===
Labour costs rose considerably during the latter part of the war, and a further wage award by the Committee on Production, together with increased cost of materials, made it necessary to consider further fare increases. The first scheme in March consisted of children's fares being made half adult fares and an alteration to ordinary stages, with no alteration to workmen's fares; this scheme was amended in April to revert to the old stages, with children's fares fixed at half the adult fare, with a 1d. minimum fare rising to 1½d. over a 2½d. and 3d. adult stage, and to 2d. over a 3½d. and 4d. stage. Ordinary fares of 1d. and 1½d. were increased by ½d. and all fares of 2d. and over were increased by 1d., the 1½d. minimum taking effect from Sunday 14 April.

War Weapons Week was held from 15 to 20 July, and a few cars decorated for use as mobile National Savings booths were parked at the principal termini or loop lines.

As a means of reducing current consumption in order to conserve coal supplies, the number of stopping places was reduced in July, followed by the starting of Sunday services at 2 p.m. instead of at 10 a.m.

November saw the end of hostilities and a further wage increase.

=== 1919 ===
A children's fare of ½d. was introduced on 8 January over the adult 1½d. stage. In June 1917, an order was placed with Dick, Kerr for 35 car equipments for delivery when circumstances permitted. These were to replace the small motors supplied on the earlier cars, and early in 1919 Dick, Kerr intimated that they would be able to execute the order during the year. A further 12 bodies were ordered from Dick, Kerr for replacement purposes, together with two top covers to complete the top covering of all service cars.

New tramcars were required to meet the increase in traffic and an order was placed with the English Electric Company Limited (successors to Dick, Kerr) for 25 cars.

Later running, until 11 p.m., was agreed upon in May. Two months later, the issue of free passes to disabled ex-servicemen was restricted to those who were unable to walk freely.

In October 1919 an amended route to Beeston was proposed, incorporating an extension of this route to Chilwell. This was to include two portions of reserved track, one approximately two miles long between Nottingham and Beeston, and the other, just over a mile long, between Beeston and Chilwell. A further proposal was for the extension of the Bulwell line to Hucknall. These proposals were carried by the council, with only one dissension.

Both these lines were incorporated in a bill before Parliament in 1920. In the resulting Nottingham Corporation Act 1920 (10 & 11 Geo. 5. c. lxvi), the Beeston and Chilwell line being passed, and the Hucknall line being passed subject to the completion of certain road works. Hucknall Urban District Council, the highway authority, objected to the line terminating in Hucknall Market Place; they were anxious for its extension to Annesley, but the corporation was unwilling to do this because of the sparseness of the population between the two districts.

=== 1920 ===
Motorbuses were considered as an alternative to the proposed tramways to Beeston and Hucknall and powers for these two routes were granted under section 18 of the Nottingham Corporation Act 1920. This act further enabled the corporation to run motorbuses on any route outside the city, provided that consent was obtained from the Minister of Transport and the local authority concerned. The first vehicles inaugurated a service to Bagthorpe, from the Bulwell tramway at its junction with the Lenton service at Bentinck Road, Radford, on 17 May, operating via Gregory Boulevard; it thus provided a link between Mansfield Road and Alfreton Road, broken since the withdrawal of the Forest Road horse-tram service.

The new cars were numbered 156 to 180. Two were promised for December 1919, and two for each succeeding month, but owing to various strikes no cars arrived until May, when ten arrived, all without brakes: apparently the brake manufacturers were still on strike. Many complaints were coming in that there were insufficient cars on each service and the manager stated that he had 27 cars off the road awaiting spares. A member of the council inquired as to when the newly arrived cars would be working, and when told about the brakes remarked about running a non-stop service.

Many improvements took place at Trent Bridge at this time, and in June 1920 an automatic trolley pole reverser was installed. This did not remain in use long, as the principal terminus was shortly afterwards removed to the end of Victoria Embankment, a new kerbside loading line being put in at the same time. The old terminus by the bridge approach remained in use for football and other specials. A new single-track line was laid along the Embankment and Bathley Street to Trent Bridge Depot, the entrance to the depot was altered, and a new shed to hold 25 cars was built on the opposite side of Turney Street.

At the council meeting in June, £41,000 (equivalent to £1,584,400 in 2025) was allocated for new car bodies and trucks, and from then on it was the policy to have the lower saloon ends of the cars vestibuled. That meant that, with a few minor variations, there were to be two types of standard car, with either three or four side windows, but there were numerous variations. As cars came in for major repairs, they received a new lower saloon: if the lower saloon was in good condition it was vestibuled locally by a firm of body builders near Trent Bridge, Henry Street and Company Limited, whose works occupied part of the property forming the former horse-tram sheds on Muskham Street. The locally vestibuled types were easily recognisable by the red lights above the driver's head, which on these were of plain red glass, the ones on the new saloons being fluted; and the small side windows behind the stairs next to the saloon, which were divided into two, with small upper panes and large lower ones, the new ones having one complete pane. These overhauls were extremely thorough and by the time the car took the road it was equivalent to a new vehicle.

Experiments were tried in fitting carbon skids for current collection instead of trolley wheels, and five cars were experimentally fitted: these were reputed to be nos. 74, 121, 136, 147 and 160; the last three definitely had skids. A bow collector was suggested, but as the skids were not considered a success, nothing further was done about this, and these cars later had wheels refitted.

During this year, £33,000 (equivalent to £1,275,200 in 2025) was spent on track, and in order to keep costs down all facing point turnouts had a dummy tongue on one side: in the case of trailing points, both sides had dummy tongues. As far as can be ascertained, Nottingham was unique in having a complete system with these types of points. When a car had to take a two-dummy trailing junction in the facing direction, dextrous placing of a point iron in the track was required to make the car go in the required direction.

Considerable difficulty was encountered in the Market Place at peak times in the control of the crowds, and a system of queuing was considered, visits being made to Leeds, Bradford and Sheffield to see similar systems there.

Previously, on race cars to Colwick ordinary fares had been charged, but in October the fare was fixed at 6d. (equivalent to £0.97 in 2025).

=== 1921 ===
During May, the coal strike had its effect on services; cars ceased at the end of the evening peak hour on Mondays to Fridays and at 7.30 p.m. on Saturdays. There was no service on Sundays. Motorbuses were taken off the Bagthorpe and Dunkirk services in the evenings, two being run over the tram route to Bulwell and one to Sherwood. On 9 July normal running was resumed.

The council passed a resolution in June suggesting the operation of a fleet of motorbuses. This was followed by Barton Brothers of Beeston offering their business as a going concern, an offer that was turned down.

Short workings were introduced to Thorneywood Lane (now Porchester Road) on the Carlton service about this time to meet increased traffic; they were extended to Standhill Road in October 1922.

A complaint brought to the attention of the Notts. and Derbyshire Tramways Company in September was rather unusual, for it concerned the practice of certain drivers in running two cars in the same direction over the outward and the inward tracks between Church Street and Cinderhill.

=== 1922 ===
The Nottinghamshire and Derbyshire Tramways Company were experiencing considerable competition from buses at this period, and reduced fares were introduced for visitors to Nottingham on the Wednesday and Saturday market days, with a consequent reduction in the amount payable to the corporation.

=== 1923 ===
In August 1922 the question of running either tramcars or motorbuses to Beeston was raised and consideration given to their operation along University Boulevard. The trustees of Sir Jesse Boot intimated that they could not agree to the laying of a tramway along the boulevard, and consequently motorbuses were decided upon

In June a further ten car body saloons were ordered from the English Electric Company, together with 20 D.B. lK3B controllers.

Requests were continually being made by various departments and organisations to put work in hand to relieve unemployment and, in October, permission was given to go ahead with the relaying of Castle Boulevard and Lenton Boulevard as far as Derby Road, and along Sherwood Rise and Nottingham Road. The first section was relaid, but work on the other was deferred pending a report on the advisability of adopting this route for trolleybuses.

Important fare concessions were given during the year. Following the withdrawal of 2d. workmen's fares on 11 January, a 2d. transfer was introduced on 1 February and finally the 1d. adult fare on trams was reintroduced on Sunday, 21 October.

=== 1924 ===
On 10 January, a deputation visited Birmingham to inspect the trolleybus system, following which a recommendation was made to introduce this system in place of all single-line tramways in the city. A provisional order was obtained to convert the Nottingham Road, Wilford Road and Wells Road sections. A limit of nine tons gross weight was imposed by the Ministry on these vehicles.

Tram stops had been marked by a series of bands painted round the poles, but early in 1924 stops in the city centre were indicated by metal plates attached to the poles.

On 10 June workmen's fares were made available until 8 a.m., an extension of half an hour, following the resumption of these fares on 10 March.

=== 1925 ===
Merit stars that carried a gratuity not exceeding 2/- per week were introduced in 1925 for employees with not less than 25 years' service.

For some time approaches had been made to the Electricity Committee suggesting that they reduce the charges for current, and reductions took place in July.

Another subject continually being raised was the formation of queues by intending passengers. Powers to enforce this had been granted in the Nottingham Corporation Act 1920, but nothing further was done in the matter until June, when experiments with a queuing system were decided upon.

On 17 August an additional motorbus service was commenced from Clinton Street to Sneinton Dale. The decision to operate followed an application by a local operator to run a similar service. A 30-minute headway was operated at off-peak periods, increased to 15 minutes at peak periods. In September, an alternative service to Beeston was instituted via University Boulevard. In view of the operation of motorbuses along Hucknall Lane and to Beeston, powers in respect of tramway operation along these routes were allowed to lapse.

The extension of the tramway to Westdale Lane was granted at the same time and the work put in hand, while the short extension of the Derby Road section to Wollaton Park Lodge Gates and trolleybus powers for Wells Road and Wilford Road were granted.

By July a loss of £30 per week (equivalent to £1,576.91 in 2025) was being incurred on the Nottinghamshire and Derbyshire Tramways Company's working, and in October it was agreed that the fare between Parliament Street and Cinderhill be reduced from 3½d. to 2d., the corporation to receive half this amount, as before.

=== 1926 – New depot at Carter Gate ===
On 1 January, the 25th anniversary of the electric tramway system, reduced fares came into operation.

A start was made in April on building the new depot at Carter Gate (Parliament Street), with accommodation for buses, trams and trolleybuses. Trams were given eight roads, all with pits, the capacity being 80 cars. A most complicated layout of track leading to the depot was put in at same time, the intention being to build a single line for one-way traffic inward to the Market Place along Lower Parliament Street and Hockley, via Victoria Street and South Parade, the outward route, also single line and one-way traffic via Long Row and Pelham Street to Hockley. Hockley was a narrow thoroughfare that had been widened towards its junction with Lower Parliament Street, but, owing to the corporation being unable to obtain a property higher up the street at a reasonable price, the whole scheme was later abandoned, although not before much track and pointwork had been laid. The double turnout at the bottom of Hockley had been in position for approximately six months when it was removed together with the short length of track leading to it, no car ever having run over it. Lines built in connection with the depot were along Southwell Road, with a three-way junction at Manvers Street, another three-way junction at Lower Parliament Street, and then along Lower Parliament Street to within 30 yards of Pennyfoot Street. There were trailing points from both lines into Stanhope Street, where the depot entrances were. A single line ran along Stanhope Street, with trailing junctions both ways into Manvers Street.

The extension from the city boundary on Woodborough Road to Westdale Lane, the third portion to be constructed outside the city, opened for traffic on 7 June.

During 1925, Barton Bros. started a service from Sandiacre via the city to Redhill and Arnold and to meet this competition the tram short working to Winchester Street at Sherwood was extended to Villiers Road and the working to Villiers Road extended to Daybrook early in 1926.

On 11 March the transfer ticket system between tram services was extended to cover transfers between Sherwood trams and Bagthorpe buses. This proved satisfactory and further facilities were introduced. The fares on inward journeys on motorbuses operating services over roads common with trams were reduced to the tram level on 26 June.

Suggestions had been made that the city's colours of green and red should be used as a livery on the vehicles, and after Railless Ltd. had forwarded a panel showing a proposed green livery, the suggestion was adopted that motorbuses and the projected trolleybuses be painted green and cream.

Green with red piping was adopted for uniforms shortly afterwards.

The British General Strike of 1926 caused disruption in the services, all services being suspended on and from 4 May. On 7 May, an emergency subcommittee of the Transport Committee met to consider the position and resolved that all employees should be instructed to report for duty on Monday, 10 May, failing which they had to return their uniform.

On Monday 10 May 14 buses manned by volunteer crews were in service and on the next day this total was increased to 23, while Wednesday found 26 buses in operation.

A meeting of the Tramways Emergency Sub-Committee was held on Wednesday 12 May, at which it was reported that the General Strike had been called off. It was resolved that all employees who had been on strike should apply for reengagement, giving an undertaking not to withdraw their services except after giving proper notice. On the following day 14 tramcars and 26 motorbuses were in service, full normal service being resumed on Friday 14 May. The volunteers who drove these buses during the strike period were given permanent employment if they so desired.

The strike delayed the construction of the Carter Gate depot and also delivery of the trolleybuses, for the manufacturers were unable to obtain certain parts. In the meantime, facilities were afforded for the garaging of motorbuses at the City Engineer's premises at Eastcroft.

A loss was still being made on the inter-running with the Nottinghamshire and Derbyshire Tramways Company, but, as the company had no practical suggestions to make, the matter was left in abeyance.

Delivery of 20 new cars commenced later in the year; they were built by the English Electric Company of Preston, having 2x40 h.p. Dick, Kerr motors, Dick, Kerr controllers and equipment, and Brush P.22 trucks. They were totally enclosed, and the last 15 had leather upholstered seats on both decks. Five of the cars, nos. 185, 188, 189, 195 and 200, had roller bearings.

Late in 1926 Sunday morning services were reduced for the first time in peacetime.

=== 1927 – The last extension and the first closure ===
1 January marked a reduction in fares, this time the introduction of a 2d. maximum between the Market Place and any tram terminus. This reduction was primarily to compete with the rival bus services to some of the outer termini.

The no. 8 tram service from Carlton was altered to operate via the Market Place and then round the Radford and Lenton circle. The remainder of the service, between the Market Place and Colwick Road via Station Street, was partially curtailed and replaced by a new un-numbered service between Colwick Road and Station Street, via Pennyfoot Street.

The last extension of the tramway took place on 16 April, when the Derby Road route was extended from Gregory Street to Wollaton Park Gates, just over a quarter of a mile in length. This was inspected by Lt. Col. G. L. Hall on 19 May. The terminus was on a private track to the north side of the gate.

Maximum tramway route mileage, 25.9 miles, existed for only a short while, from 7 June 1926, the date of the Mapperley extension, to 10 April 1927, when the Nottingham Road service was taken off. The Wollaton Park extension started a week after the first tram route was taken over by trolleybuses operating on the new Nottingham trolleybus system.

=== 1928 – Changes in the Market Square ===
The opening of the Arnold and West Bridgford motorbus services resulted in a reduction in the frequency of the tram service between Arnold and Trent Bridge, while the frequent Sherwood to Trent Bridge service was altered to run between Arnold and Wollaton Park.

The rebuilding of the Council House and alterations to the Market Square resulted in the tram lines being moved to give more road space on the north side.

During this year the Nottinghamshire and Derbyshire Traction Act 1928 (18 & 19 Geo. 5. c. xciii) enabled the abandonment of that tramway system, the introduction of trolleybuses in their stead, and to change the company's name to Nottinghamshire and Derbyshire Traction Company. The corporation agreed not to oppose the bill, the company expressing willingness to pay the corporation the cost of constructing and removing the Cinderhill tramway.

The corporation then applied for trolleybus powers over the route in 1929, agreeing that when trolleybuses were introduced the corporation would take all the receipts and allow the company a certain amount in return for working expenses. Subsequently, the company intimated that they were desirous of substituting motorbuses instead, but later withdrew this.

As the Wilford Road tram track needed repair, trolleybuses were again considered for this road and in September, following a report from the manager regarding the whole of the services and types of traction, the decision was made to replace the single-line tram lines along Wells Road and Wilford Road with trolleybuses, and to apply for powers in the 1929 parliamentary session to operate, in one direction, via George Street, Victoria Street and South Parade. It was also agreed that when further motorbuses were required, vehicles of larger capacity would be purchased in order to give a better service and improved peak hour facilities.

J. Aldworth, the manager, retired on 31 December, his place being taken on 1 January 1929, by W. G. Marks, formerly Manager of Chesterfield Corporation Transport and, before that, Deputy Manager of Rotherham Corporation Tramways. Others on the short list for the position were W. Boot, Rolling Stock Superintendent at Nottingham, and R. Hoggard, the Manager of Lincoln Corporation Transport. Hoggard was subsequently appointed to fill Marks' former position at Chesterfield.

Carter Gate (renamed Parliament Street) depot and offices opened on 2 December, Trent Bridge depot becoming a workshop.

== Nottingham Corporation Passenger Transport Department ==
=== 1929 ===
The appointment of Marks as General Manager was followed by a lengthy period of development and expansion, indicated by a change of designation to "Nottingham Corporation Passenger Transport Department".

Delay to Nottingham cars was being caused by Nottinghamshire and Derbyshire Tramways Company cars loading produce at the Parliament Street terminus, so henceforth they continued along to Sneinton Market to load.

The operation of special trams and motorbuses to meet railway excursion trains commenced on 3 March, with a fare of 6d. for adults (equivalent to £1.37 in 2025) and 3d. for children (equivalent to £0.69 in 2025).

=== 1930 ===
The operation of a motorbus service to Arnold, which started during the previous September at a fare of 2d., quickly had its effect on the services of Barton Bros., who withdrew on 3 November 1929, and J. Bloomfield, who operated three buses over a similar route. This resulted in the purchase of Bloomfield's business by the corporation, the through fare immediately being raised to 3d. This, together with the opening of the Wells Road Wilford Road trolleybus service on 20 March, brought about tramcar working alterations. The frequency of the Arnold to Trent Bridge service was reduced, while alternate cars ran only between Villiers Road, Sherwood, and Trent Bridge. Cars previously running to Villiers Road were altered to serve Lenton and Radford, the London Road service being linked with that to Wollaton Park.

Following experiments with Forest City type electrically operated points on the tram track at Woodborough Road and a set made by the Equipment and Engineering Company at the Queen Victoria Statue, a further eight of Forest City manufacture were purchased, enabling the release of 20-point boys.

The Nottingham Corporation Bill of 1930 contained ambitious proposals for trolleybus operation which, had they been granted and put into full operation, would have required some 200 vehicles. These proposals covered the conversion of tram routes, together with extensions and linking services. The extensions comprised sectors from Carlton, via Station Road and Conway Road, returning via Burton Road and Main Street with a connection along Manor Road, via Main Street, Gedling Road and Westdale Lane to Mapperley; from Mapperley, along Plains Road to Spring Lane and via Woodthorpe Drive to Mansfield Road; via Sneinton Dale, Cardale Road, Thorneywood Lane, Porchester Road to Mapperley; in Arnold, via Mellors Road, Redhill Road, Mansfield Road to Daybrook Square; from Bulwell Market to the City boundary at Bulwell Hall Estate; along Ilkeston Road, Middleton Boulevard and Derby Road; via University Boulevard, Broadgate to Beeston; Queens Road and Chilwell bypass to Attenborough. A second route to Beeston was via Derby Road and Wollaton Road, together with a branch along Woodside Road, Lenton Abbey Estate.

University Boulevard was deleted on account of legal difficulties encountered in the terms of Lord Trent's bequest of the land for the Boulevard. Although all the proposed routes were passed by the House of Commons, those not served by tramcars outside the city boundary were deleted by the House of Lords because of strong opposition by Nottinghamshire County Council and the Trent Motor Traction Company Limited. The remainder were passed, the Nottingham Corporation Act 1930 imposing a 12-ton weight limit on the vehicles. The additional routes granted comprised those along Sneinton Dale, Cardale Road and Porchester Road to Woodborough Road; Canal Street, round Castle Boulevard, Lenton Boulevard, Radford Boulevard and Gregory Boulevard, thence via Mansfield Road, Huntingdon Street and Lower Parliament Street to Canal Street; along Derby Road and Woodside Road to the City boundary; Abbey Bridge to Greenfield Street at Lenton. A loan of £781,000 (equivalent to £44,137,000 in 2025) was authorised in connection with the conversion. It was intended that eventually the Aspley Estate should be looped from Cinderhill and that there should be an outer circle via Valley Road and Western Boulevard.

=== 1931 – First tramcars sold ===
A promise had been made to Carlton Urban District Council that the Carlton tramway service would be the first to be converted to trolleybus operation. It was intended to connect this service with the Wollaton Park section by introducing trolleybuses in place of motorbuses via Ilkeston Road, continuing round Middleton Boulevard to Derby Road and returning via the Derby Road tram route to the city.

In June, the tramway along Derby Road was cut back to the city side of the railway bridge while the bridge was rebuilt and widened, the motorbus service via Ilkeston Road to Wollaton Park being extended in August to Wollaton Park gates on Derby Road to cover the curtailment. The tram service was not reinstated for, on 29 November a circular trolleybus service was opened, the city terminus being at the Central Market.

Despite the introduction of trolleybuses on the Nottingham Road, Wells Road and Wilford Road services, the strength of the tram fleet remained at 200 until May, when nine old cars were sold for £20 10s. 0d. each

=== 1932 – Lenton and Sherwood services curtailed ===
Due to difficulties with the turning arrangements at Carlton, the conversion of this route was not completed until March, and Lt. Col. Anderson inspected the route on 18 March, the last tram ran on 19 March, and trolleybuses commenced operation the next day. The service was linked with the route to Wollaton Park, and a turning circle was erected at Scalford Drive on Middleton Boulevard to enable vehicles to turn from Derby Road.

On 15 May later services were introduced over the principal routes, some being extended to 11.20 p.m. This was followed on 5 September by the curtailment of off-peak tram services to Lenton and Sherwood. The Sherwood curtailment resulted in a saving of £2,500 per annum. A further saving was made by removing tram track on Derby Road beyond Canning Circus for use in repair work elsewhere.

=== 1933 – More trams sold ===
In February, a decision was made to go ahead at the earliest opportunity with the conversion of the Bulwell tramcar service to trolleybus operation, and an extension of the route to Bulwell Hall Estate. Before any action was taken, however, the Colwick Road route and both routes to Trent Bridge were included in the scheme, together with two routes not served by trams, i.e. Huntingdon Street, and Nuthall Road, between Bentinck Road and Stockhill Lane.

Although no tramway abandonment had taken place since 1932, some 30 trams were considered as surplus to requirements in November, but the only price offered was £13 per car, so they were dismantled by the Department, the bodies and scrap metal being sold separately.

=== 1934 ===
The conversion of the Bulwell and Arkwright Street routes to trolleybus operation was well in hand, together with the extension to Bulwell Hall Estate, and trolleybus services over these routes came into operation on Sunday 13 May.

The conversion would have left one tram route in the west of the city, the Lenton and Radford service, which it had been intended to convert to trolleybuses before the Bulwell section. However, Gunn recommended its conversion to motorbuses to coincide with the Bulwell trolleybus conversion and this took place on 13 May. New oil-engined motorbuses were operated on this service, numbered 26, while the Monday to Friday peak hour tram service 27 between the Midland Station and Colwick Road was converted to petrol bus operation.

=== 1935 ===
In April, the committee accepted the manager's recommendation that the Mapperley tram service should be converted to motorbus operation, and it was hoped that this would happen before August. However, the matter was delayed on account of an 8d. increase in the tax on fuel oil. Proposals for this conversion were brought before the city council, who approved, by a small majority, the use of motorbuses instead of trolleybuses. In November it was similarly agreed to convert the Arnold tramway.

After the closing of the Colwick Road and the London Road tramways, the tramcar fleet was reduced to 40 cars.

Six of the trucks from surplus cars were disposed of to Buenos Aires.

== Nottingham City Transport ==
=== 1936 – The end of tramcar operation in Nottingham ===
The name of the undertaking was changed from Nottingham Corporation Passenger Transport Department to Nottingham City Transport.

On 9 January officials went for a trial run over the Mapperley via Woodborough Road route in one of the new motorbuses destined to displace the trams on 2 February.

Conversion work on some new buses entailed the alteration of Sherwood Depot to accommodate motorbuses, the remaining trams being transferred to Parliament Street.

Some seven months later, on 6 September, the remaining tram service to Arnold was replaced by motorbuses. This ended the era of the tram in Nottingham. Twelve trams and one railgrinder were sold for only £17 l0s. 0d. each (equivalent to £1,069 in 2025) as a result of the first conversion. The remaining trams were sold after September, many of the 1927 cars to Aberdeen Corporation Tramways, where they worked for a further 15 years.

A debt of £65,000 (equivalent to £3,971,800 in 2025) remained on the tramway system, this being repaid at the rate of £24,000 (equivalent to £1,466,500 in 2025) per annum.

== Surviving relics ==
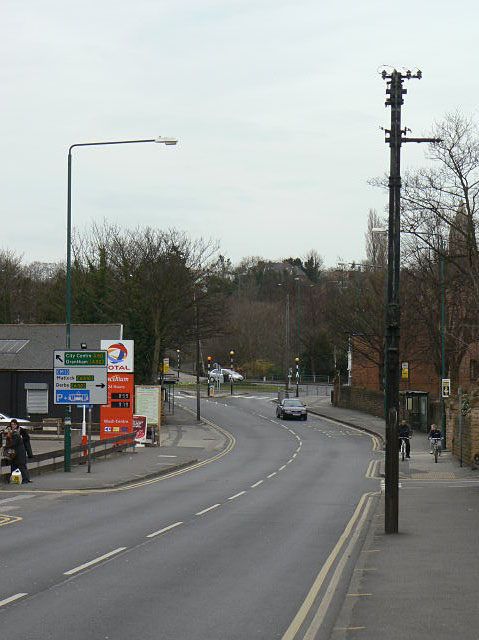
Cable pole on Sherwood Rise

- One cable pole halfway up the Sherwood hill on Mansfield Road.
- Tram track in Parliament Street depot and an inscribed stone panel reading "Nottingham Corporation Tramways 1926".
- Tram track buried under the tarmac surface of Upper Parliament Street, exposed when NET Line 1 was constructed, and outside the Victoria Shopping Centre in 2006 when the road was re-surfaced.
- Lower deck of open-top tramcar No. 45 (built in 1901) cosmetically restored for display together with three unrestored trams in store at Clay Cross, all part of the National Tramway Museum Collection.
- Sherwood Depot still remains. Part of the building has been converted into a play centre and a J.D. Wetherspoons public house ("The Samuel Hall"), with the remaining half of the building being a bus depot for CT4N (formerly Nottingham Community Transport)
- Trent Bridge and Parliament Street Depots remain in use as bus depots for Nottingham City Transport.
- In October 2015 a set of points was unearthed underneath Station Street.
