= Wheeler Gate, Nottingham =

Street in Nottingham, England

Wheeler Gate
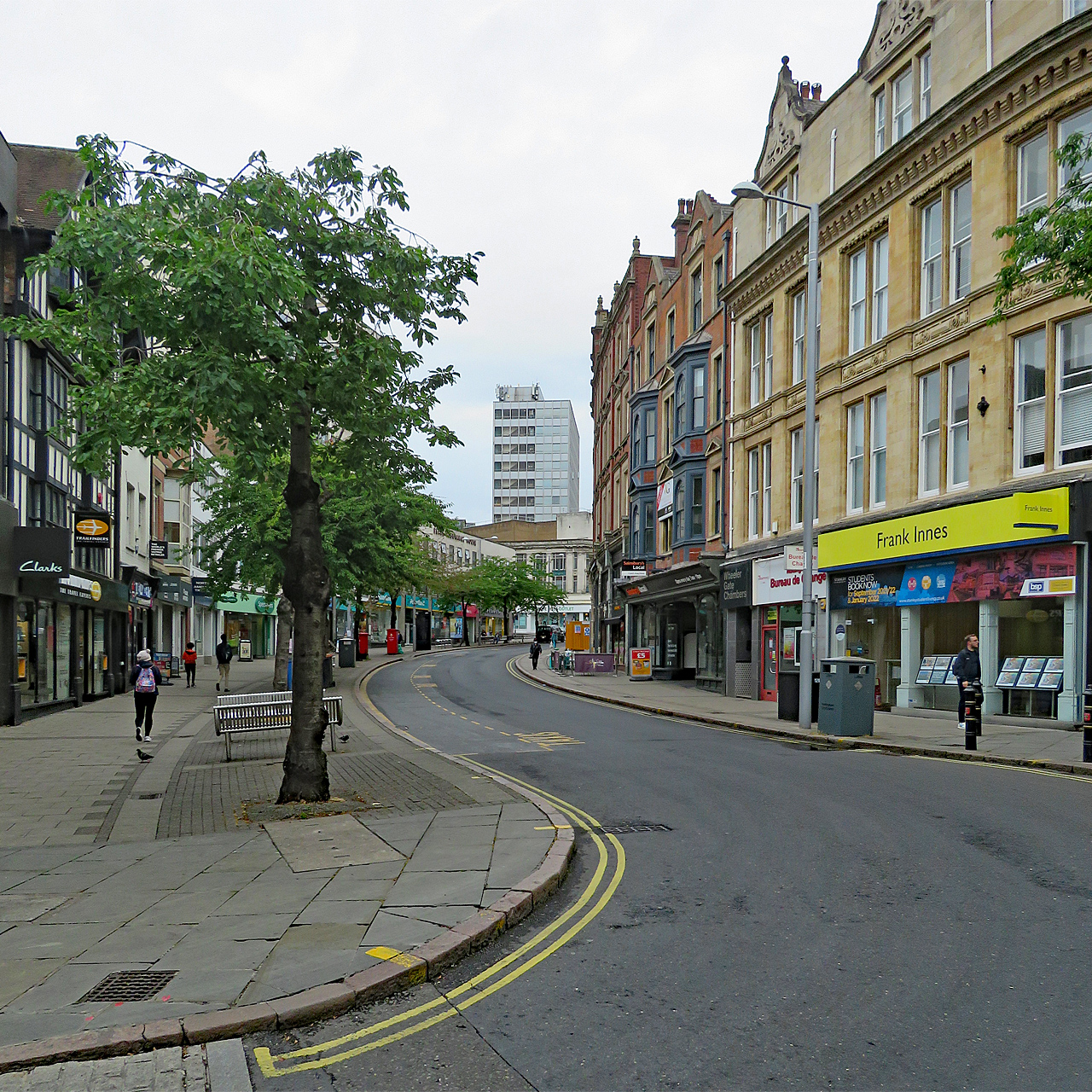
- A view

- Location within Nottingham
- Maintained by: Nottingham City Council
- Coordinates: 52.9525°N 1.1501°W

Wheeler Gate is a street in Nottingham City Centre between Old Market Square and St Peter’s Square.

== History ==
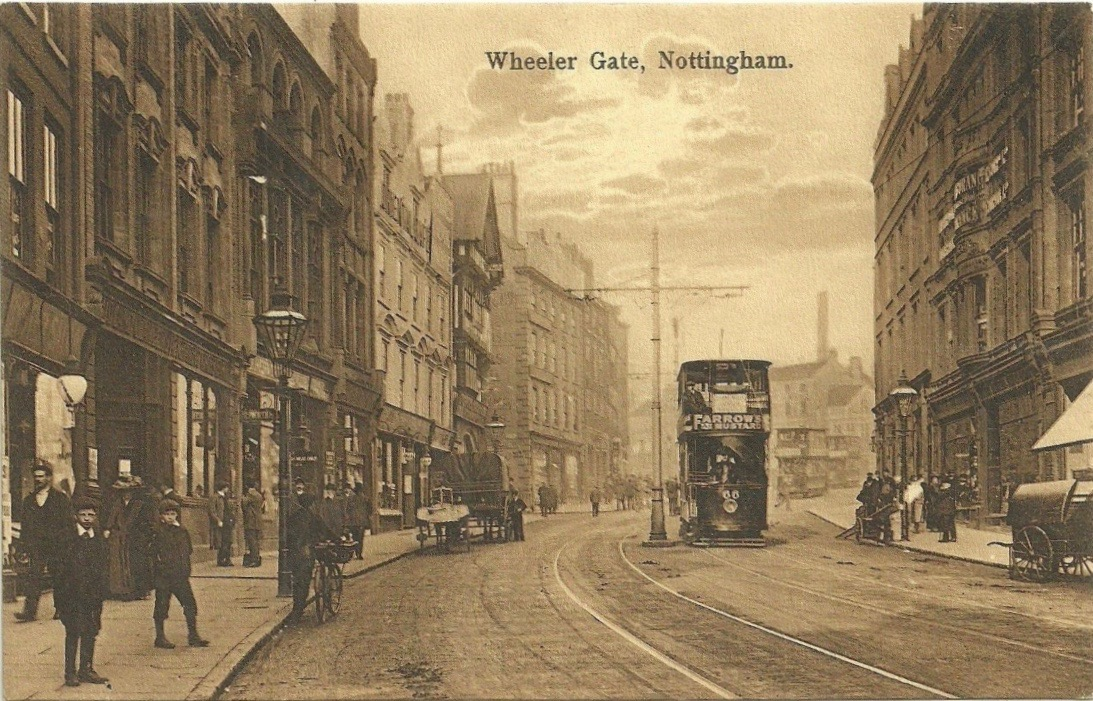
Nottingham Corporation Tramways car 66 descending Wheeler Gate, ca. 1910

In 1313 the street is referred to as Baxter Gate but shortly afterwards became known as Wheeler Gate, or Wheel Wright Gate, as the location of the wheel makers.

It was 25 feet (7.6 m) wide at its narrowest point just below the Reindeer Inn, so the Town Council under took a project to widen it in 1885 to a uniform 60 feet (18 m) with the buildings on the eastern side being completely replaced. The roadway was 40 feet (12 m) wide with pavements on each side of 10 feet (3.0 m) width.

In 1900, the conversion of the horse drawn tramway to electric power and extensions to the system built by the Nottingham Corporation Tramways included a double track route from St Peter’s Square along Wheeler Gate to join other tram lines in the Market Square.

== Notable buildings ==
=== North east side ===
- 1, 3 and 5, Cavendish Buildings by John Howitt 1894. Grade II listed.
- 9 to 23 Premier House by John Howitt ca. 1900 Grade II listed.
- 25 to 29 by Robert Evans for E. Swann Grade II listed. (Sisson and Parker’s bookshop, Sainsbury in 2017)

=== South west side ===
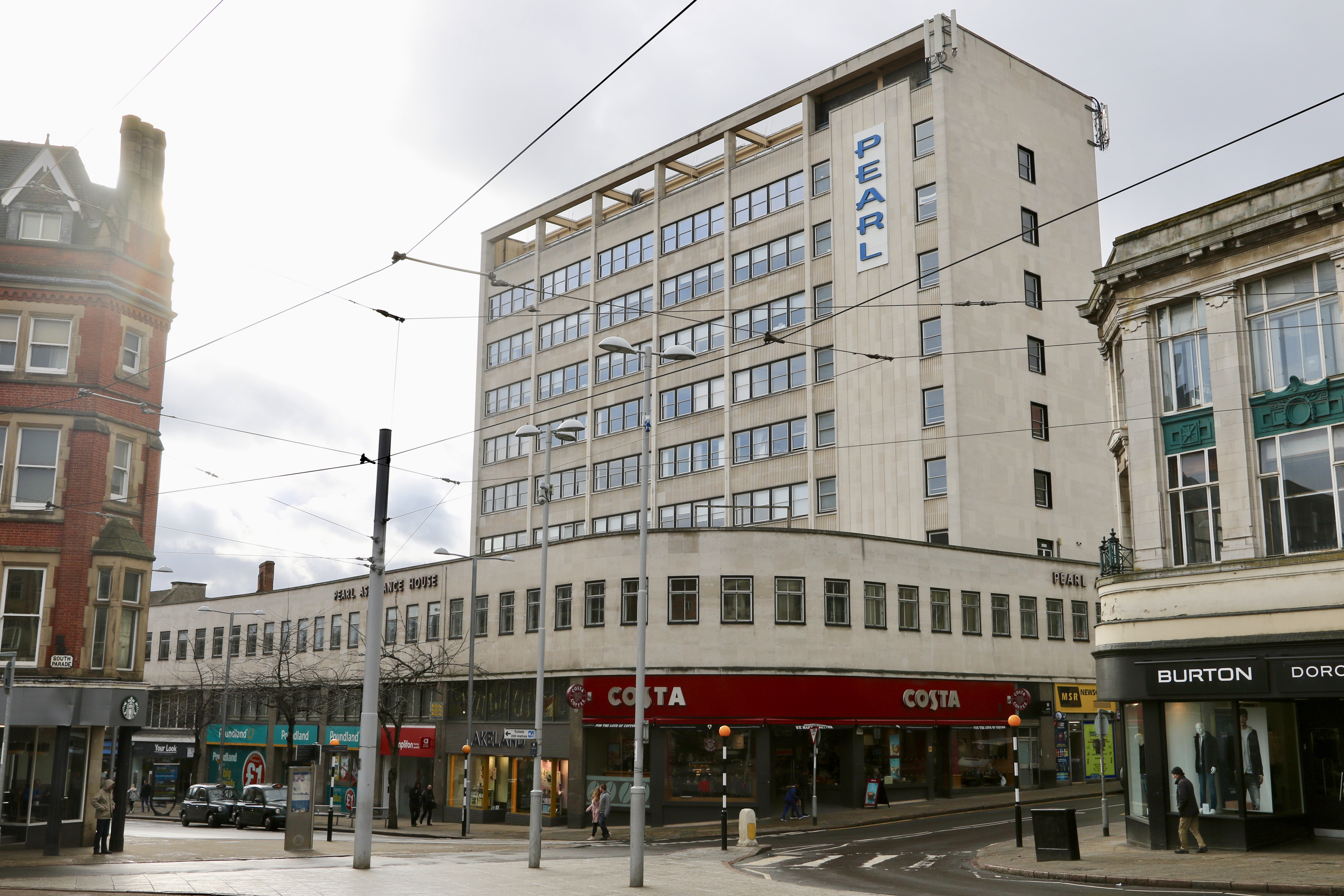
Pearl Assurance house by Evans, Cartwright and Woollatt 1960-62

- 2-16 Pearl Assurance House by Evans, Cartwright and Woollatt 1960-62
- 18 Eldon Chambers. Remodelled in 1868 by Robert Evans, Grade II listed.
- 34 to 36 Morley’s Cafe, half-timbered by John Armitage 1908 (Trailfinders Travel Agents in 2017)
