= John Armitage (architect) =

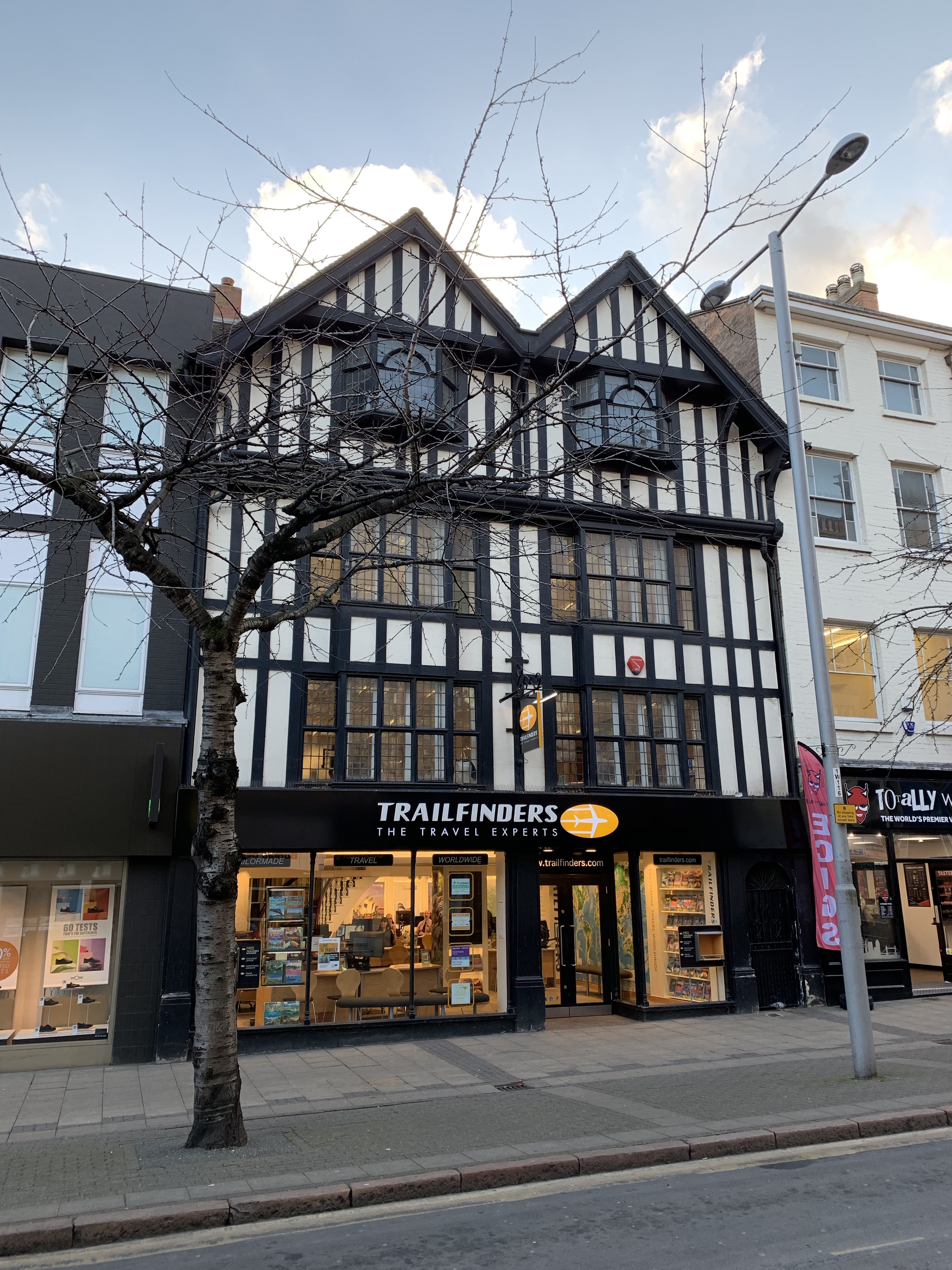
Morley's Cafe on Wheeler Gate, Nottingham 1908

John Armitage (9 May 1874 – 1 November 1953) was an English architect based in Nottingham and London.

== Career ==
He was born in 1874 in Nottingham, the son of Samuel Fox Armitage (1830–1914) and Joanna Jarrett (1836–1922). He was educated at Bootham School, York, and then apprecenticed to Arthur Brewill and Basil Baily.

He commenced independent practice in Nottingham in 1898 and opened an office in Westminster in 1900. From 1902 to 1904 he took Francis Giesler Newton as an articled pupil, and from 1903 to 1904 he took William Barnet Wyllie.

On 16 March 1904, he was initiated into the Cordwainer Ward Lodge and was recorded as being resident in Broad Sanctuary, London.

He is recorded as living in Nottingham in the 1901 and 1911 censuses.

He married Olga Ramsey (1878–1941), daughter of farmer Robert Ramsey, on 1 July 1907 in St Barnabas' Church, Pimlico.

He died in 1953 in Surrey.

== Notable works ==
- Electrical company works, Berwick upon Tweed, 1903 (now demolished)
- Morley’s Cafe, 34 to 36 Wheeler Gate, Nottingham 1908
