= Samuel Dutton Walker =

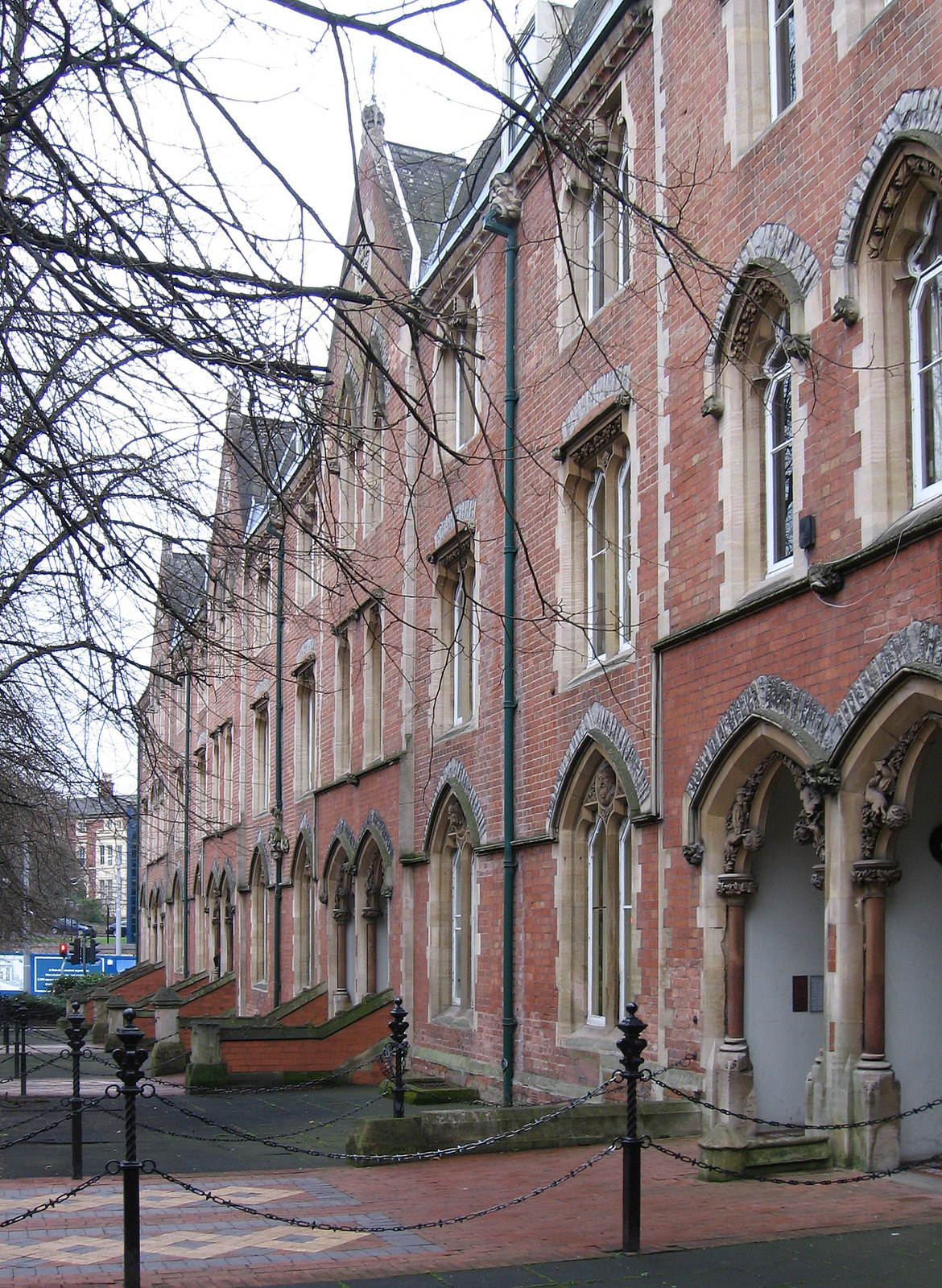
Terrace Royal, Clarendon Street, Nottingham 1863

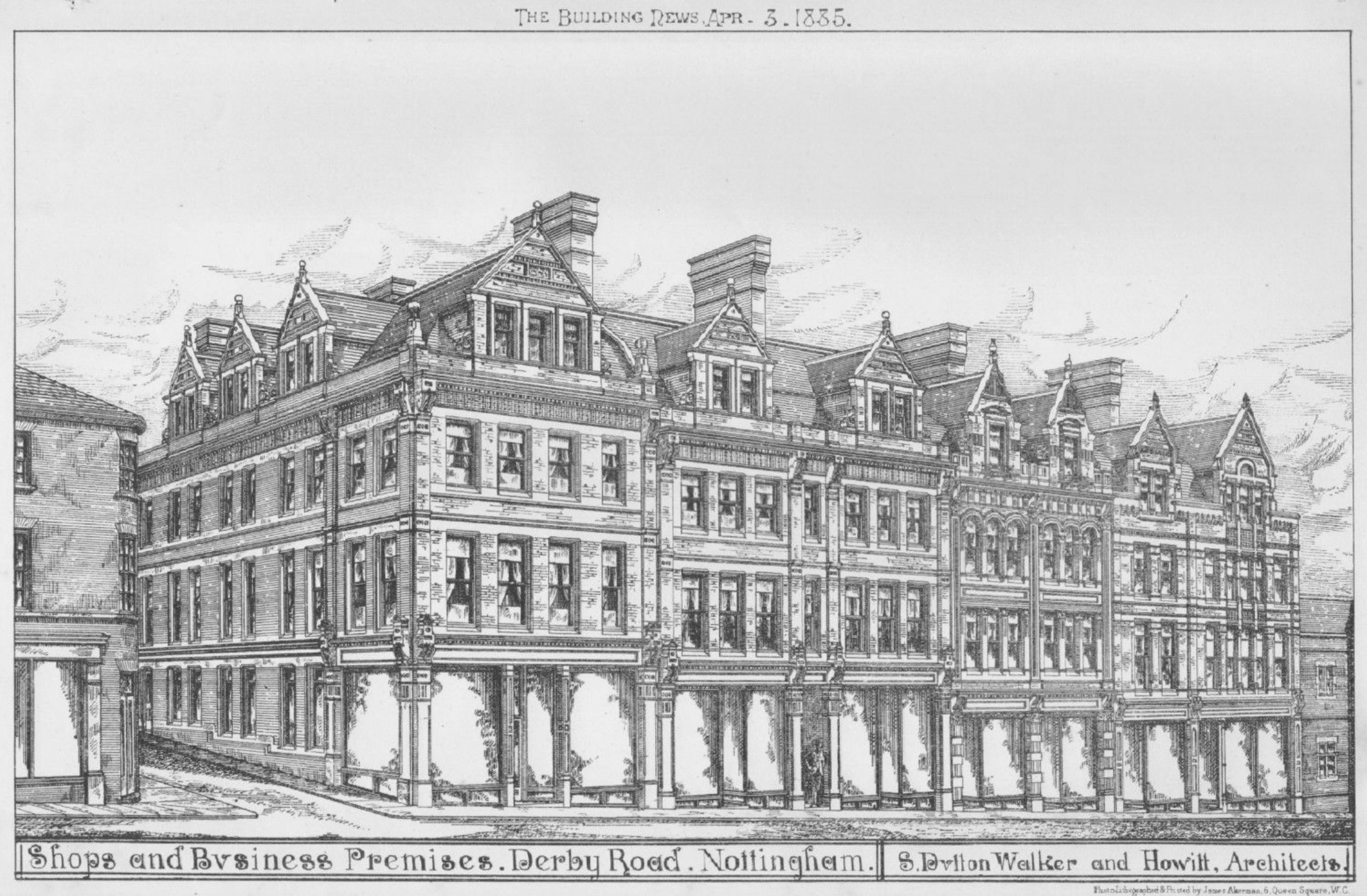
48-60 Derby Road, from The Building News, 3 April 1885

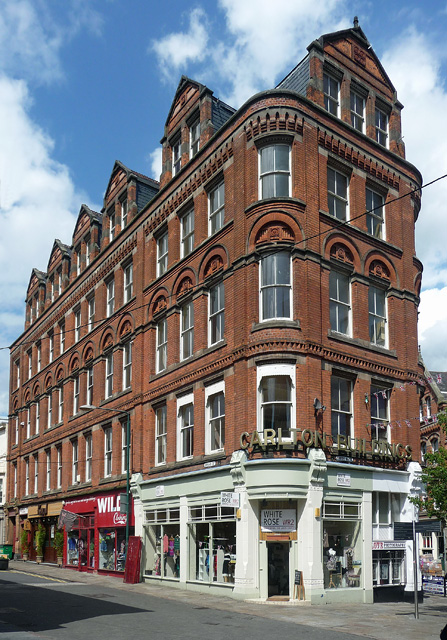
Carlton Buildings, Heathcote Street, Nottingham 1881

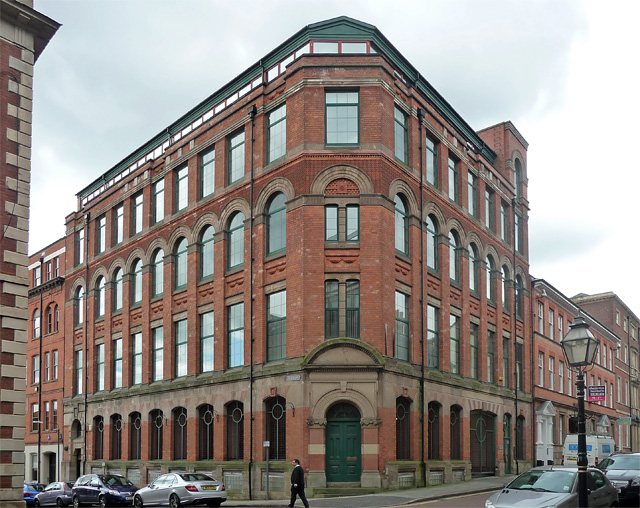
Warehouse, Castle Gate/Stanford Street, Nottingham 1880

Samuel Dutton Walker (1833 – 15 June 1885) F.S.A. was an architect based in Nottingham.

== History ==
He was born in 1833, the son of George Frederick Walker. His brother Herbert Walker also became an architect in Nottingham.

On 23 January 1862 he married Elizabeth Rebekah Oldershaw at St James' Church, Standard Hill.

Two of his pupils, Arthur Brewill and Arthur George Marshall went on to have successful careers as architects in the Nottingham area. His younger brother Herbert Walker studied with him from 1860 to 1866. In 1879 he went into partnership with John Howitt, as Walker and Howitt, and this partnership lasted until Walker's death in 1885. They established themselves in a practice in Severn Chambers, 10 Middle Pavement, Nottingham.

He was involved with the Nottingham School of Art and two scholarships were founded through his connection with it, one which enabled the holder to study church architecture abroad.

He died on 15 June 1885 and left an estate valued at £13,945 2s. 2d. (equivalent to £1,902,600 in 2023).

== Works ==
- Terrace Royal, Clarendon Street, Nottingham 1863 (with A. Wilson)
- Methodist Chapel, Great Freeman Street, Nottingham 1863
- Royal Albert Orphanage, Henwick, Worcester. 1868 (with William Watkins)
- Sutton Fields House, Kegworth 1875-76
- Ashley House, Park Drive, The Park Estate, Nottingham 1877
- Hide, fat and skin warehouse, Eastcroft Depot, London Road, Nottingham 1878-79
- 48-60 Derby Road 1878–83, now Regent Court apartments (with Howitt)
- 34 Market Street, Nottingham 1879
- Heathcode Buildings, 9-19 Goose Gate, Nottingham 1879-81 (with Howitt)
- Warehouse, Castle Gate/Stanford Street, Nottingham 1880 (with Howitt)
- Nottingham School of Art 1881 new roof
- Dixon and Bowles Warehouse, Haymarket, Leicester 1881.
- Carlton Buildings, Heathcote Street, Nottingham 1881 (with Howitt)
- King John's Arcade, Bridlesmith Gate 1882 with John Howitt
- 15-17 Broad Street, Nottingham 1883-84
- 34 Broad Street, Nottingham 1883-84(with Howitt)
- Organ case, Friar Lane Congregational Chapel, Nottingham 1884
- Nottingham Savings Bank, Clayton's Yard, Nottingham 1884-85 extension of the banking room, new boardroom, consulting room and strongroom.
