= Severn's Building =

Building in Castle Road, City of Nottingham, Nottinghamshire, England

Coordinates: 52°56′59.51″N 1°9′11.16″W

Severn’s Building
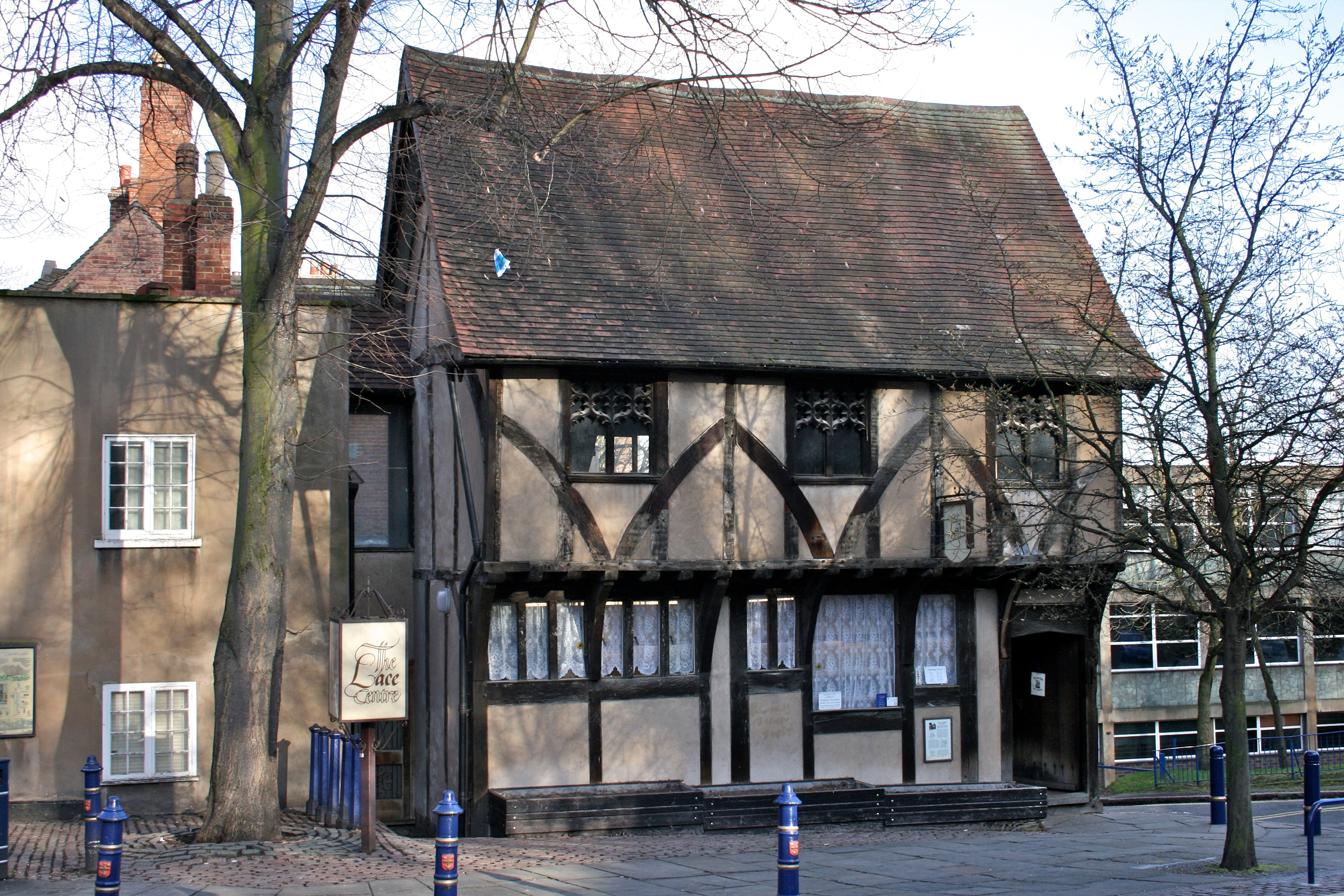

- Location within Nottingham

General information
- Location: Castle Road, Nottingham
- Estimated completion: 1450
- Client: Vacant
- Owner: Nottingham City Council

Design and construction
- Designations: Grade II listed

Severn's Building is a Grade II listed building dating from the 15th century in the English city of Nottingham. Originally located in the city's Middle Pavement, it was relocated to the junction of Castle Road and Castle Gate around 1970.

The building has two stories and is timber-framed, with a jettied first floor, rendered nogging, and a plain tile roof.

== History ==
Severn's Building dates from around 1450. It was built as a merchant's house and located on Middle Pavement. When the street was numbered, it became no. 10. From 1879 to 1885 it was the offices of Samuel Dutton Walker and John Howitt, architects. John and James Severn operated a wine and spirit business on Middle Pavement and in 1900 they moved into this building.

The roof of the building's yard was extensively damaged in the Nottingham Blitz. After the Second World War the owners put forwards plans for alterations to the building. It was also under threat as there were plans to widen Middle Pavement.

In 1968 and threatened by the planned development of the Broadmarsh Centre, the building was acquired by Nottingham City Council and dismantled by F.W.B. Charles. It was reassembled on Castle Road by 1970. Between 1980 and 2009, the building was used as a lace museum and shop.

The building was put up for sale by the city council in 2012. In 2013, Severn's Building was sold, along with a number of other buildings on Castle Gate that formerly housed a costume museum, to a local developer. In June 2022 the building was again placed on the market with a valuation of £499,000.

== See also ==
- Listed buildings in Nottingham (Radford and Park ward)
