= John Howitt =

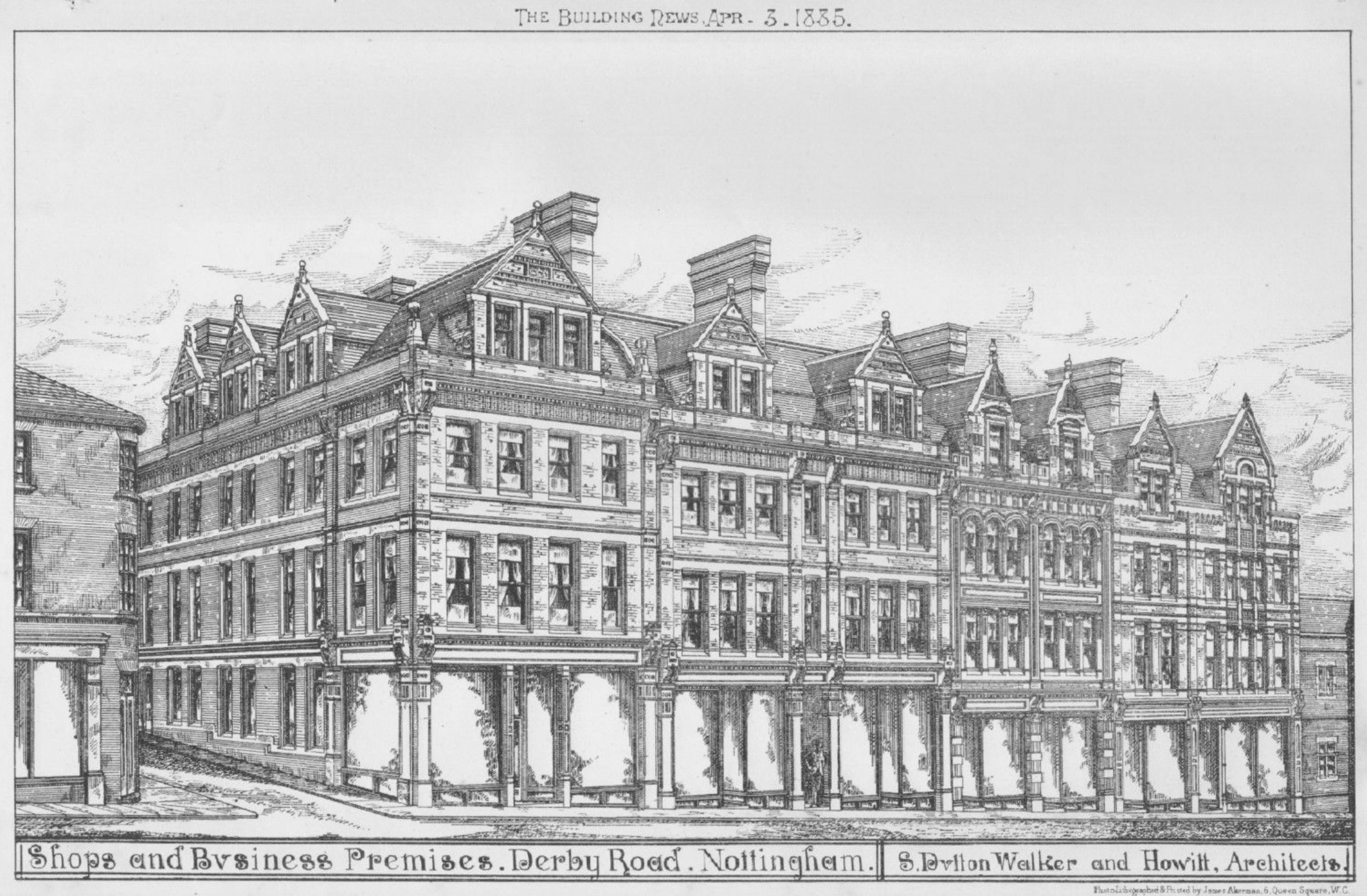
48-60 Derby Road, from The Building News, 3 April 1885

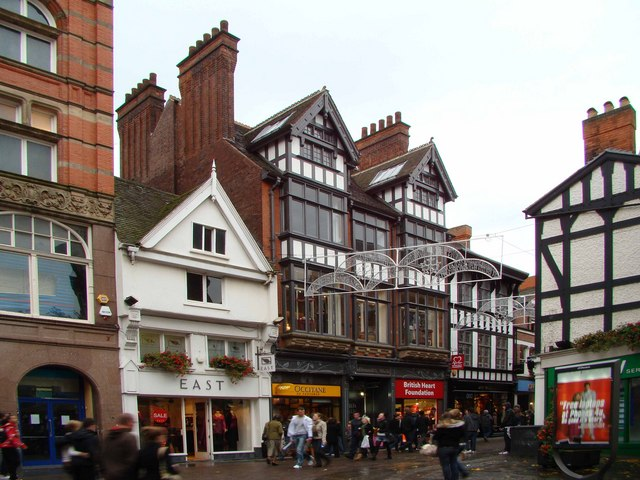
Bridlesmith Walk, Nottingham 1882

John Howitt (6 July 1852 – 9 June 1923) FRIBA was an architect based in Nottingham.

== History ==
He was the son of William Howitt of Underwood. He was educated at Holly Mount School, Nottingham and the Nottingham School of Art.

He was articled to Samuel Dutton Walker of Nottingham in 1867 becoming chief assistant and managing clerk, and from 1879 entered partnership with him as Walker and Howitt up to the time of Walker's death in 1885, based in Severn Chambers, 10 Middle Pavement, Nottingham. He later set himself up in partnership with his son as J. Howitt and Son.

He was elected a Fellow of the Royal Institute of British Architects in 1890 and was president of the Nottingham Architectural Society from 1894-95. He died on 9 June 1923 and left an estate valued at £6,768 (equivalent to £487,600 in 2023).

== Works ==
- Heathcote Buildings, 9-19 Goose Gate, Nottingham 1879-81 (with Walker)
- Warehouse, Stanford Street, Nottingham 1880 (with Walker)
- Carlton Buildings, Heathcote Street, Nottingham 1881 (with Walker)
- King John’s Arcade, Bridlesmith Gate 1882 (now Bridlesmith Walk)
- 15-17 Broad Street, Nottingham 1883-84
- 34 Broad Street, Nottingham 1883-84(with Walker)
- Organ case, Friar Lane Congregational Chapel, Nottingham 1884 (with Walker)
- Nottingham Savings Bank, Clayton’s Yard, Nottingham 1884-85 extension of the banking room, new boardroom, consulting room and strongroom (with Walker)
- Baptist Chapel, Arkwright Street, Nottingham. 1888
- Swann House, Plumptre Place/Duke’s Place, Nottingham 1889
- Nottingham and Nottinghamshire Convalescent Homes, Skegness 1893 (demolished 1980)
- Price House, 37 Stoney Street, Nottingham 1894
- Cavendish Buildings, 1-3 Wheeler Gate, Nottingham 1894
- Premier House, 9-23 Wheeler Gate, Nottingham 1894-95
- Office block, Milton Street/Foreman Street, Nottingham 1903
- Duke’s Place, Plumptre Place, Nottingham 1904-05
- Nottingham Furnishing Company, 115 Upper Parliament Street, Nottingham 1906 (later amalgamated with the Co-operative Building next door)
- No 4, Chapel Bar, Nottingham 1908 (Howitt and Son)
- No 23 Warser Gate, Nottingham 1909-10 (Howitt and Son)
- Warehouse, 13 Houndsgate, Nottingham 1921-22 (Howitt and Son)
- Masonic Hall, Chaucer Street, Nottingham 1928-31.
