= St James' Church, Standard Hill =

St. James' Church, Standard Hill, Nottingham
- St. James' Church, Standard Hill, Nottingham
- 52°57′05″N 1°9′17″W
- OS grid reference: SK 56888 39666
- Country: England
- Denomination: Church of England
- Churchmanship: Evangelical

History
- Dedication: St. James

Architecture
- Architect: William Stretton
- Style: Perpendicular Gothic
- Groundbreaking: 1808
- Completed: 1809
- Construction cost: £13,000
- Closed: 1933
- Demolished: 1935

Administration
- Province: York
- Diocese: Diocese of Southwell
- Parish: Nottingham

St. James' Church, Standard Hill was a Church of England church in Nottingham.

== History ==
In 1807, an Act of Parliament sanctioned the erection of a new church. It was opposed by the three clergy of the existing parishes of Nottingham, but the land was acquired in the extra-parochial district of Standard Hill, over which none of the existing clergy had jurisdiction.

Despite the failure of their opposition, the three clergy succeeded in clogging its usefulness by imposing conditions on it. It had no parish, and marriages could not be celebrated in it during its first years.

The principal backers of this new church were Thomas Hill, Edmund Wright, Richard Eaton and Benjamin Maddock.

In 1808 a cornerstone was laid. The Rev. J. H. Maddock acted as Chaplain. The building proceeded and in 1809 the edifice was consecrated by Edward Venables-Vernon-Harcourt the Archbishop of York.

Shortly afterwards an independent congregation started to meet in the church. They left in 1883 when they opened their own church, Park Hill Congregational Church on Derby Road.

=== Incumbents ===
- 1809 John Burnett Stuart
- 1841 John Charles Coleman
- 1848 Edward Bull (formerly Rector of Pentlow, Essex)
- 1877 John Brown (formerly curate in charge of St James' Church, Boston)
- 1884 Arthur Hamilton Baynes (afterwards senior chaplain to the Archbishop of Canterbury)
- 1888 Alfred Whymper (afterwards vicar of St Paul's Church, George Street, Nottingham)
- 1892 Lawrence Wilkins
- 1902 Bingley Cass (formerly assistant curate of Holy Trinity Church, Woolwich)
- 1916 William Leek Latham (formerly vicar of Sutton-in-Ashfield)
- 1924 Charles Edward Swinerton
- 1928 Herbert Victor Turner (formerly vicar of St Anne's Church, Worksop)
- 1934 Sydney Richards

== Bell ==
The bell in the tower was cast in 1791 by Hedderley for a cotton mill in Broad Marsh.

== Organ ==
The first organ was installed in 1815 by the builder Thomas Elliot. A specification of the organ can be found on the National Pipe Organ Register. Since the closure of the church, some of the pipes from the organ found their way into the new instrument at St. Cyprian's Church, Sneinton.

=== List of organists ===
- Henry Bond 1828 - 1866
- Francis Marshall Ward 1867 - unknown
- Mr. Gregory unknown - 1879
- Herrap Wood 1879 - 1882 (afterwards organist of St Dionysius' Church, Market Harborough)
- James Buckland Lyddon
- William Ryde 1896 - 1901 (formerly organist of Church of the Holy Rood, Edwalton, laterly organist of St Giles Church, West Bridgford)
- Frederick Edward Hollingshead 1901 - 1902 (formerly organist of Uttoxeter Parish Church, afterwards organist of St. Andrew's Church, Walcot, Bath then organist of St. Andrew's Church, Nottingham)

== Closure and demolition ==
The church was demolished in 1935 to make way for an extension to the Nottingham General Hospital. The church congregation moved to a new location in Mapperley Park. The parish was combined with that of St Peter's Church, Nottingham.
