= Great Bowden =

Village in Leicestershire, England

Coordinates: 52°29′31″N 0°54′14″W

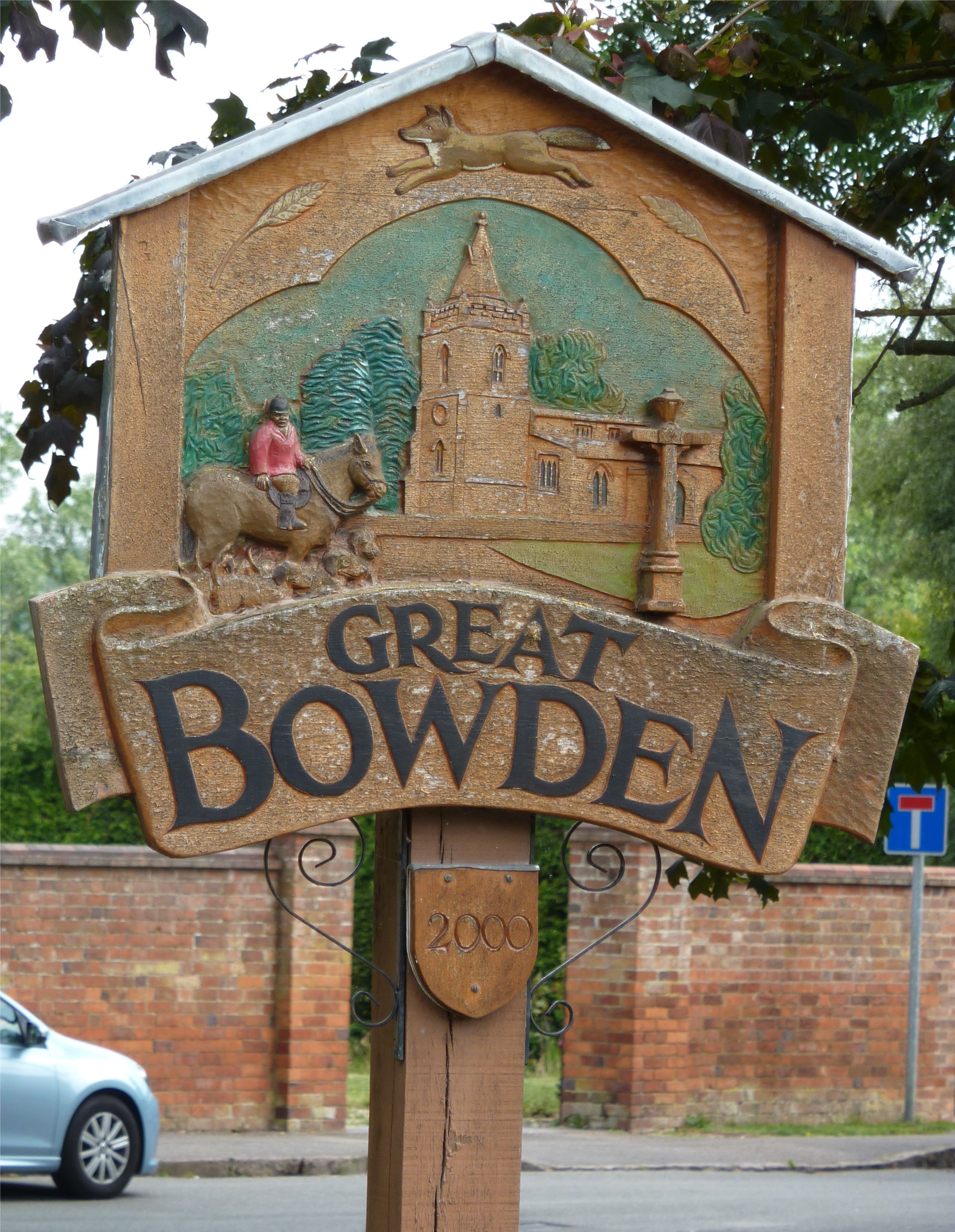
- Great Bowden Village Sign

- Location within Leicestershire
- Population: 1,017 (2011 Census)
- District: Harborough
- Shire county: Leicestershire
- Region: East Midlands
- Country: England
- Sovereign state: United Kingdom
- Post town: MARKET HARBOROUGH
- Postcode district: LE16
- Police: Leicestershire
- Fire: Leicestershire
- Ambulance: East Midlands
- UK Parliament: Harborough, Oadby and Wigston

Great Bowden is a village and civil parish in the Harborough district of Leicestershire, England. It is north-east of and a suburb of Market Harborough, although originally the parish of Great Bowden included Harborough. The population is around 1,000, being measured at the 2011 census as 1,017. Places nearby include Market Harborough, Little Bowden, Sutton Bassett, Foxton and Thorpe Langton.

== Anglo-Saxon origins ==
The village was included in the Domesday Book, under the name 'Bugedone' and was worth 40 shillings per year to the King. 'Bugedone', is a combination of the Old English female personal name 'Bucga' and the word 'dun' (meaning 'a hill, a flat-topped hill, an open upland expanse'). It is one of the older villages in Leicestershire since it has Anglo-Saxon origins (it is older than the much larger market town of Market Harborough, which lies nearby). Great Bowden was the centre of a large soke, which is known to have existed during the time of Edward the Confessor.

== Parish ==
The first mention of a parish church in Great Bowden was in 1220. St Peter and St Paul, the current parish church, includes features from the 13th century, but it was considerably altered in the 15th century. In 1886-87 the building was restored by Talbot Brown and Fisher, architects from Wellingborough. The churchyard contain gravestones that date from the 17th century.

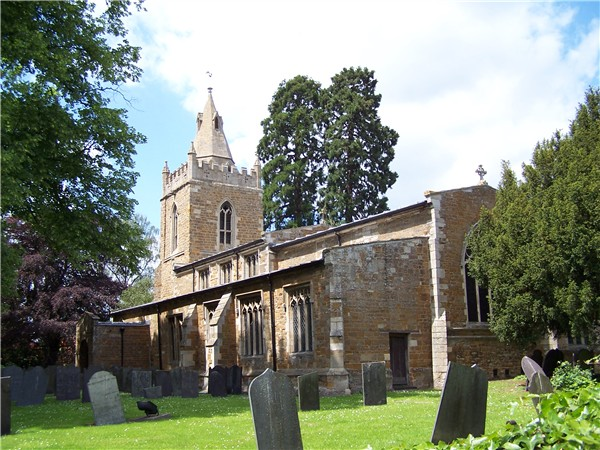
Great Bowden parish church

The Great Bowden parish historically included Market Harborough and parts of St Mary in Arden. In 1613, St Mary in Arden was unified with Market Harborough The chapelry of Market Harborough was made a separate civil parish in 1866.

In 1879 Great Bowden, Market Harborough and Little Bowden were united as a local government district. Such districts were reconstituted as urban districts in 1894. Great Bowden remained a civil parish until 1927, but as an urban parish it had no parish council of its own, instead being administered directly by Market Harborough Urban District Council. The three parishes within the urban district were combined into a single parish of Market Harborough in 1927.

Market Harborough Urban District and civil parish were abolished in 1974 and the area become part of the larger Harborough District. A new parish of Great Bowden, focussed on the village itself, was created in 1995 covering a much smaller area than the historic parish.

== Education ==
The National school was built adjoining the parish church in 1839, and opened on 2 December 1839, In 1930, it became solely a primary school and older children were educated in Market Harborough. The National school building remained in use until the school relocated to Gunnsbrook Close in 1983. On 1 July 2012 the school became an academy.

== Listed buildings ==
There are 73 listed buildings and structures.

== Site of scientific interest ==
Great Bowden Borrowpit is a 2.4-hectare (5.9-acre) site of special scientific interest.
