= Market Harborough Town Hall =

Municipal building in Market Harborough, Leicestershire, England

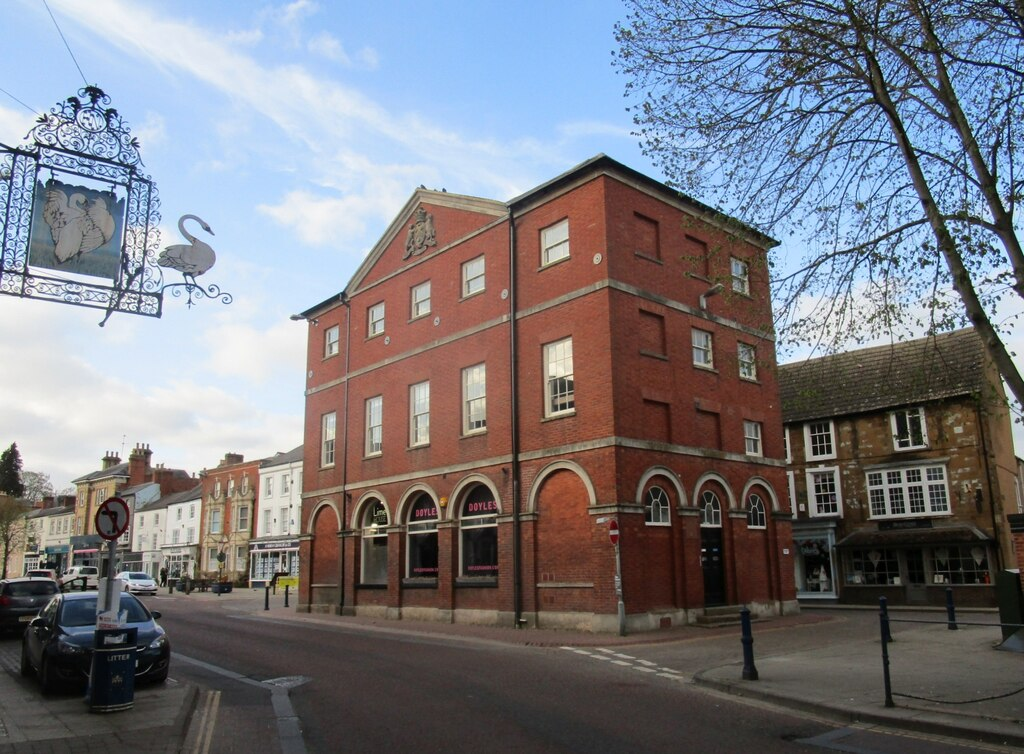
- Market Harborough Town Hall

- Shown in Leicestershire
- 52.4793°N 0.9224°W
- Location: High Street, Market Harborough

History
- Built: 1788

Site notes
- Architectural style: Neoclassical style

Listed Building – Grade II
- Official name: The Town Hall
- Designated: 25 July 1952
- Reference no.: 1074426

Market Harborough Town Hall is an historic building in the High Street in Market Harborough, Leicestershire, England. The building, which originally contained assembly rooms on the upper floors that have subsequently been converted for commercial use, is a Grade II listed building.

== History ==
The town received a royal charter, allowing it to hold markets, from King John in 1204. For many centuries the market took the form of a series of stalls erected in an area which extended from the Square to the High Street, although by the 17th century some of those stalls were of brick construction.

In the 1780s, the lord of the manor, the Earl of Harborough, decided to construct a permanent market building for the benefit of the town. The new building was designed in the neoclassical style, built in red brick with stone dressings and completed in 1788. It was originally arcaded on the ground floor to allow meat markets to be held. The design involved a symmetrical main frontage with five bays facing onto the west side of the High Street: this elevation featured sash windows on the first and second floors under a pediment with a coat of arms of the Earl of Harborough in the tympanum. The north elevation featured Venetian windows on the first and second floors while the south elevation featured windows on three floors above the arcading but most of these windows were blocked. The east elevation, i.e. the back of the building, featured a single sash window which was on the second floor. Internally, the principal rooms were the assembly rooms on the first and second floors.

After significant population growth, partly due to its status as a market town, the area became an urban district with the town hall in 1894. However, the assembly rooms in the town hall were seldom used for civic purposes, particularly after the council established permanent offices on Northampton Road shortly after the First World War. The Symington family, which owned the offices and accompanying estate, known as Brooklands, donated the facilities on Northampton Road to the town, for civic use, in July 1946.

The town hall was later converted to alternative uses with the ground floor being altered for retail use, the first floor becoming commercial offices and the second floor operating as a gentleman's club. The second floor was also later converted for office use and the three office suites created on the upper two floors were all refurbished in autumn 2018.
