= Great Bowden Borrowpit =

UK Site of Special Scientific Interest

Coordinates: 52.501°N 0.906°W

- Site of Special Scientific Interest
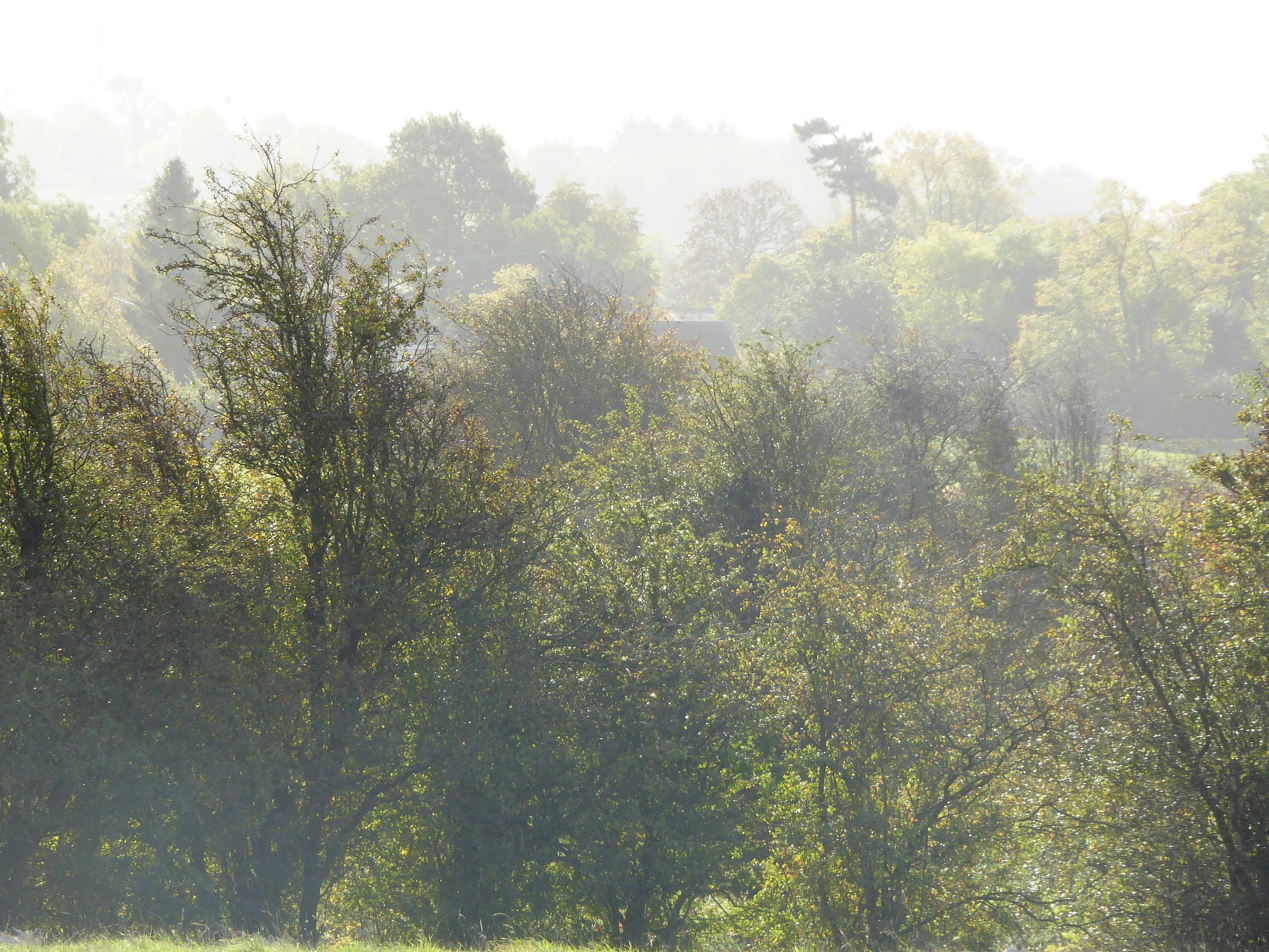
- Location of Great Bowden Borrowpit.
- Area of search: Leicestershire
- Grid reference: SP 743 898
- Interest: Biological
- Area: 2.4 hectares
- Notification date: 1983
- Location map: Magic Map

Great Bowden Borrowpit is a 2.4-hectare (5.9-acre) biological Site of Special Scientific Interest north of Market Harborough in Leicestershire.

This former railway borrow pit has an unusual marsh, dominated by soft rush, tufted hair grass and cottongrass. Other plants include bulrush and bog moss. Snipe feed on the site.

The site is private land with no public access.
