= City War Memorial, Nottingham =

Triumphal arch and war memorial in Nottingham, England

- United Kingdom
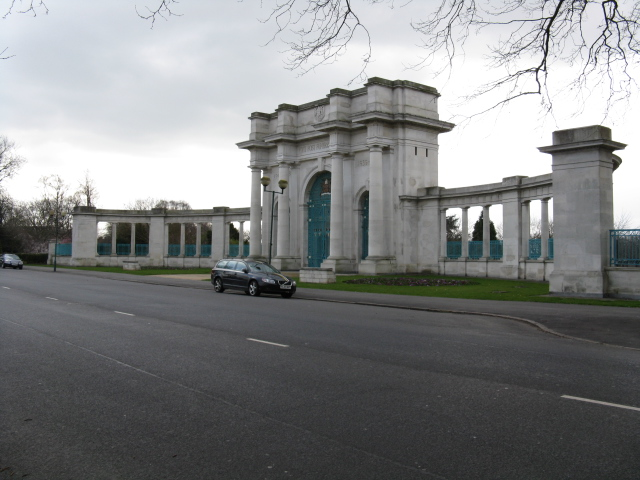
- For Men of Nottingham who died in the First and Second World Wars.
- Unveiled: 11 November 1927
- Location: 52.934492°N 1.140752°W; Nottingham
- Designed by: Thomas Wallis Gordon

The City War Memorial, Nottingham, also known as the Nottingham Municipal War Memorial and the City of Nottingham War Memorial, is the main war memorial for the city of Nottingham in England. It comprises a memorial arch of Portland stone with three openings and wrought iron gates, and stone flanking arcades. It was unveiled in 1927 beside a new park overlooking the River Trent, and became a Grade II listed building in 1972.

== Background ==
The Lord Lieutenant of Nottingham (William Cavendish-Bentinck, 6th Duke of Portland) and the Mayor of Nottingham convened a public meeting in 1919 to discuss proposals for a city war memorial, to commemorate around 40,000 men from Nottinghamshire who served in the British armed forces during the First World War, around 10,000 of whom were killed. Suggestions included building a university, expanding the city's general hospital, an ex-serviceman's organisation, memorial homes, a campanile, a sculpture, or an architectural monument.

A public appeal sought £100,000 for Nottingham General Hospital, of which £90,000 was funded by two people, Sir Jesse Boot and William Goodacre Player, from the local businesses Boots the Chemist and John Player & Sons. A further £20,000 was sought for a monument in Nottingham's Market Square, but by 1920 the proposal shifted after Sir Jesse Boot donated an area of land for the monument on Trentside, to the south of the city centre. Overcoming complaints that the money would be better spent on supporting servicemen and their dependents, the city council announced in October 1922 that the land would become a 36 acres (15 ha) public park with a memorial gateway. The project was estimated to cost £70,000, with £50,000 to be funded by a loan from the Ministry of Health. Further funds came from the Ministry of Labour's Unemployment Grants Committee to engage unemployed men to do some of the work.

The memorial was designed by Thomas Wallis Gordon, Nottingham City Engineer and Surveyor for Nottingham Corporation from 1896 until 1935.

== Description ==
The main structure is a triumphal arch in Classical Revival style, about 14 m (46 ft) high and 18 m (59 ft) wide, with four tall Doric columns, a projecting triglyph above each column, plain frieze, heavy projecting cornice, and deep parapet. The columns frame three openings, each of which has a pair of wrought iron gates and fixed lunette.

The central archway is about 8 m (26 ft) high and 5 m (16 ft) wide, with the city's coat of arms worked into the metalwork lunette above the gates. The smaller side arches are about 6 m (20 ft) high and 2.5 m (8.2 ft) wide. Carved into the stone above the side arches are the dates "1914-1918" (left) and "1939-1945" (right). The frieze above the central arch is inscribed with the Latin motto from the City's coat of arms, "VIVIT POST FUNERA VIRTUS", which may be loosely translated as "virtue outlives death", above which there is a carving of the city's coat of arms on the parapet. The interior walls of the archway have bronze plaques with inscriptions, including one inscribed with the words of tribute that the French Marshal Foch gave to the Sherwood Foresters in 1918.

The arch is flanked to either side by curved stone colonnades of three bays, about 6 m (20 ft) high and 26 m (85 ft) long, with a frieze, cornice and low parapet, with wrought iron railings between the stone columns. The walls on either side extend the overall length to over 70 m (230 ft). As originally built, steps aligned with the central arch led down to the west bank of the River Trent, but the steps were moved after the Second World War. The central arch is still aligned with an ornamental pond in the memorial gardens to the west.

== History ==
The memorial was installed on the east side of a new Memorial Garden (now also grade II listed) to the south of the Meadows, on Victoria Embankment beside the River Trent, facing towards West Bridgford on the opposite bank. The foundation stone was laid by Edward, Prince of Wales (later Edward VIII), on 1 August 1923. After delays attributed to the extensive groundworks, the memorial was unveiled by Edmund Huntsman, Mayor of Nottingham, on 11 November 1927. The service of dedication was carried out by James Gordon, then Vicar of St Mary's Church, Nottingham. The ceremony was attended by a crowd of several thousand people with a parade by the Robin Hood Battalion (7th Battalion, Sherwood Foresters).

The memorial was later adapted to commemorate those people who died in the Second World War. It was listed at Grade II in 1972.

== Great War Memorial ==
A new Great War Memorial was unveiled nearby in 2019 by the Prince Edward, Duke of Kent, with a 5 m (16 ft) high stone monolith surrounded by a raised penannular ring faced with Portland stone and faced with slate panels etched with the names of the 13,501 people from the county of Nottinghamshire who were killed in the First World War, including civilians killed by a Zeppelin raid in 1916, casualties of an explosion at the National Shell Filling Factory, Chilwell in 1918, and soldiers shot at dawn for cowardice or desertion. The Great War Memorial was commissioned by Nottingham City Council and Nottinghamshire County Council, in collaboration with the district and borough councils of Ashfield, Bassetlaw, Broxtowe, Gedling, Mansfield, Newark and Sherwood, and Rushcliffe.

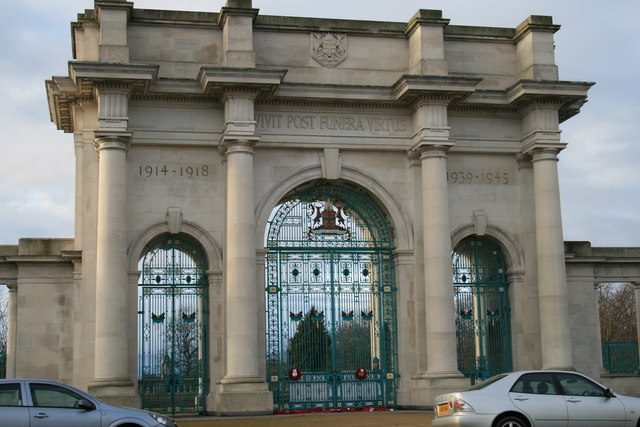

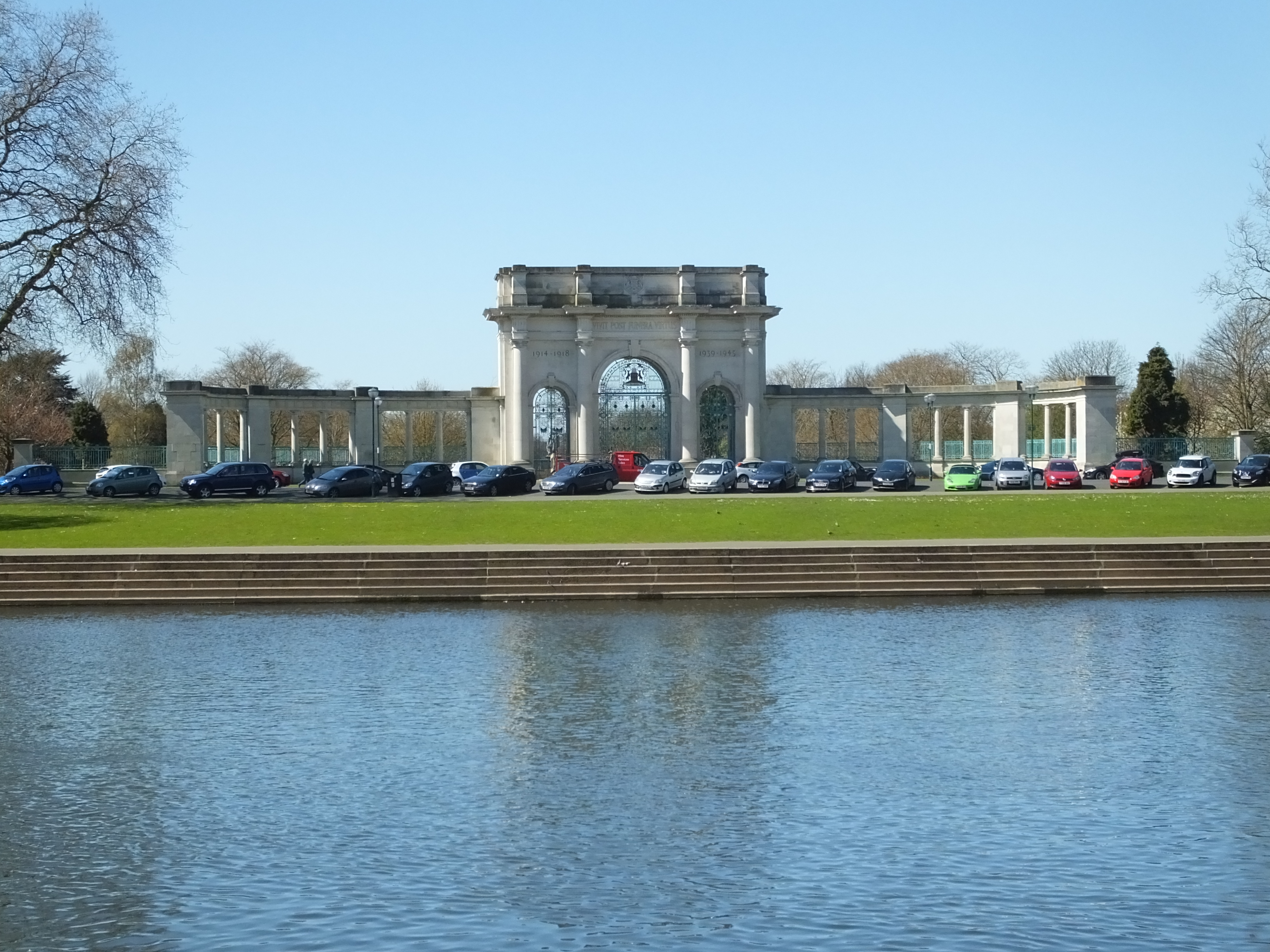

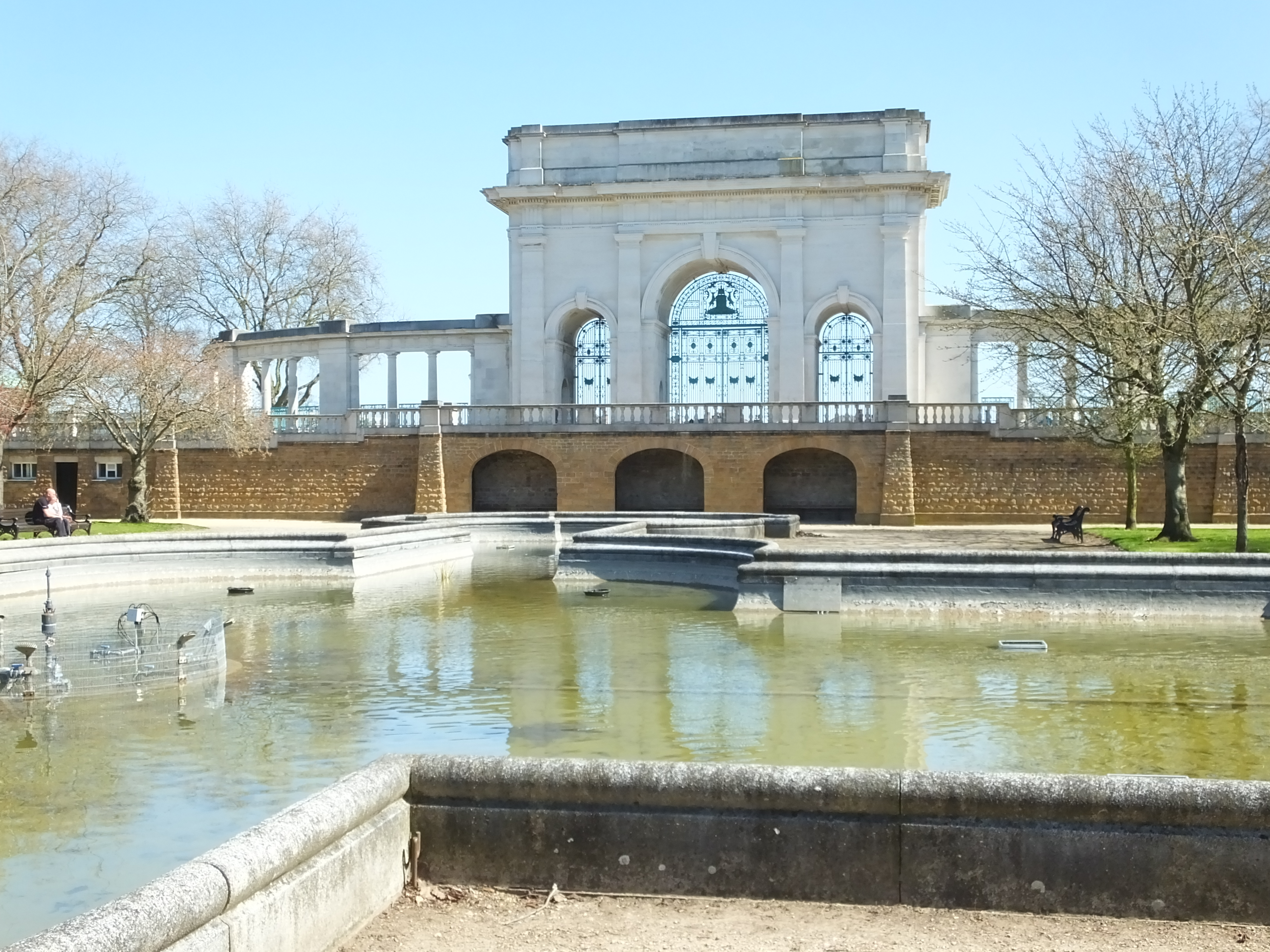

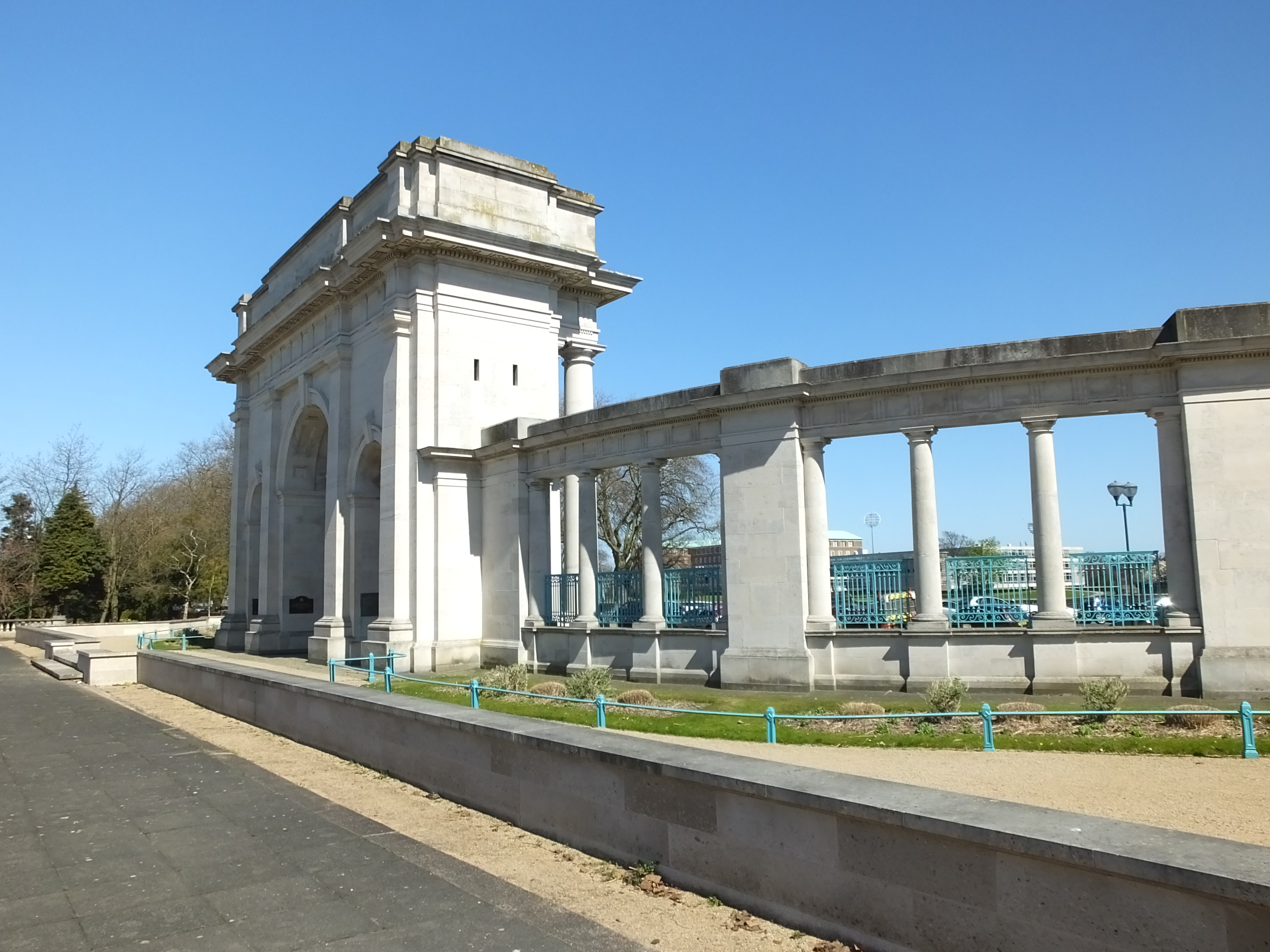

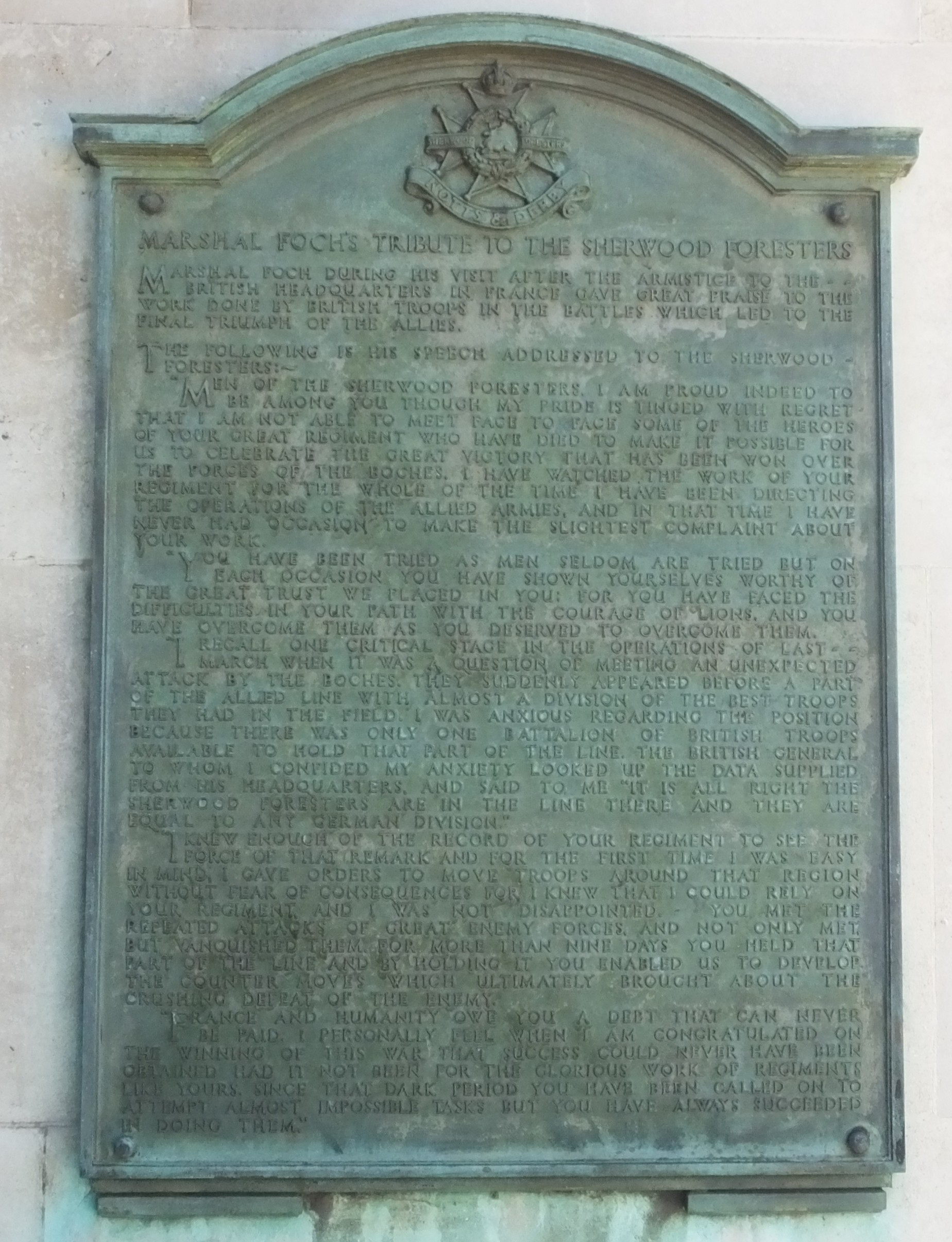

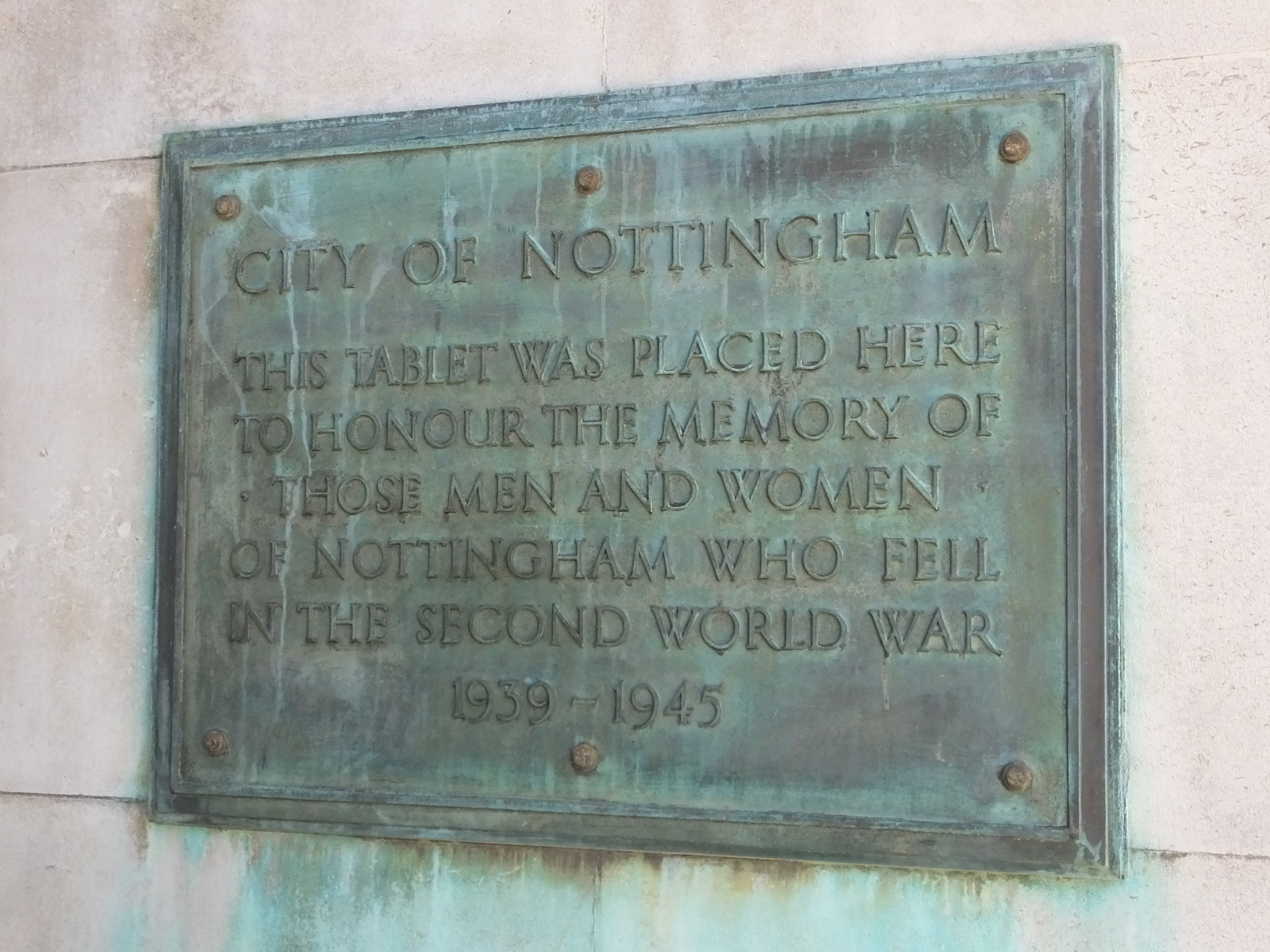

== See also ==
- Listed buildings in West Bridgford
- Arch of Remembrance, another war memorial arch in the nearby city of Leicester
