= St Mary in Arden Church, Market Harborough =

Ruined church in Leicestershire, England

Coordinates: 52°28′50″N 0°54′38″W

St Mary in Arden Church is a ruined church on Bowden Road in Market Harborough, England. Although it was established before the 13th century, the Grade II listed remains are part of the later 17th-century church built on the same site.

== Building ==
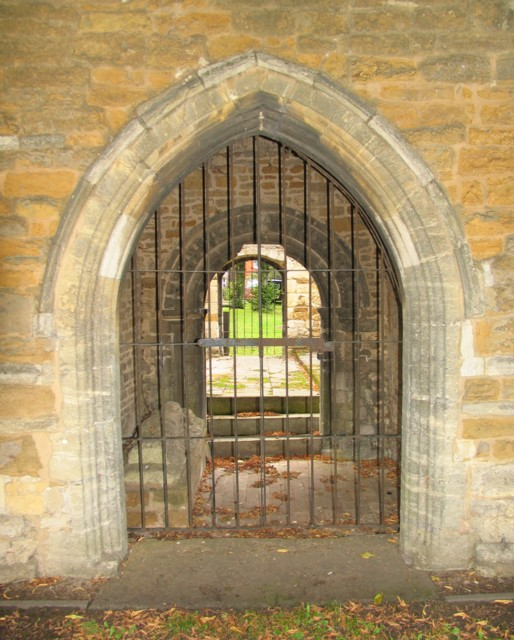
St Mary in Arden - Doorway

St Mary in Arden was first mentioned in records in 1220. In 1617 there were fears that the church steeple would fall, and damage was caused to it by an earthquake in 1625. In 1682, a visitor to the church described it as in ruins. In 1682, four bells from St Mary in Arden were taken to the church at Market Harborough.

The remains now on the site are mainly from the church built in 1693. The stone church has a simple oblong ground plan designed by the architect Henry Dormer. In 1797, the floor was described as being rough and unpaved, with dirty walls and no pews. However, there was stalls placed alongside the north and south walls for mourners. In 1925, the church was re-fitted so it could be used for occasional services. After the Second World War the fittings were dismantled, and in 1950 the lead roof was removed. It was listed Grade II on 25 July 1952.

The remains of the church incorporate Norman beak ornaments in the 12th-century doorway, as well as the church porch built in the 14th century. There are wolves'-head moulds on the interior and a 14th-century effigy of a lady that is broken.

== Burials ==
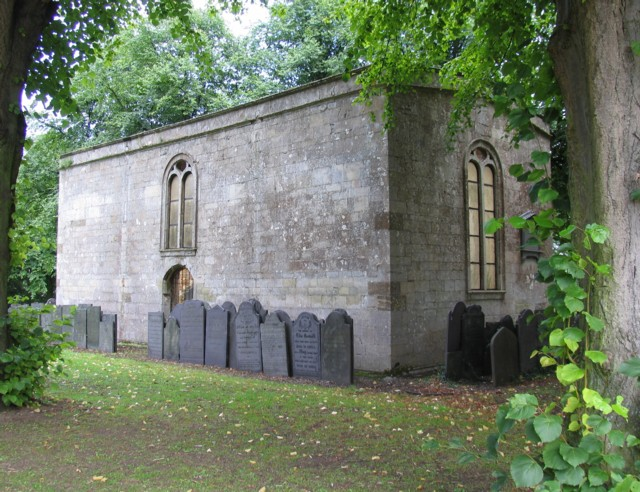
St Mary in Arden

The churchyard was used for burials from at least the mid-15th century. The existing 17th-century gravestones are mainly made from Swithland slate, and the 18th-century gravestones of limestone. The last burial was in 1878.

== Parish of St Mary in Arden ==
The word Arden was associated with Rockingham Forest, Northampton. St Mary in Arden church was not mentioned in the Domesday Book, so it was suggested that its mother church was Great Bowden. The geographical area of St Mary in Arden Parish overlaid the townships of Market Harborough, Leicestershire, and Little Bowden, at that time in Northamptonshire. Additionally, it was also within the two ecclesiastical dioceses of Lincoln and Peterborough. It was financially poor. Some early bequests to the church are recorded in 1403 to 1406, when the testaments of nuns that lived at the nunnery of St. Micheal's, Stamford, left monies for candles and lamps with the request that the congregation pray for their souls. In 1574, the church had a separate curacy. However, due to the misconduct of the curates, in 1613, there was unification with the curacy of Market Harborough, and a single priest from Market Harborough covered both churches. Thereafter, divine service, the sacraments, and marriages predominantly took place in Market Harborough, and only occasionally were divine service and sermons held at St Mary in Arden. In 1614, there were provisions put into place to continue to maintain St Mary in Arden church building.

== Easter Hymn ==
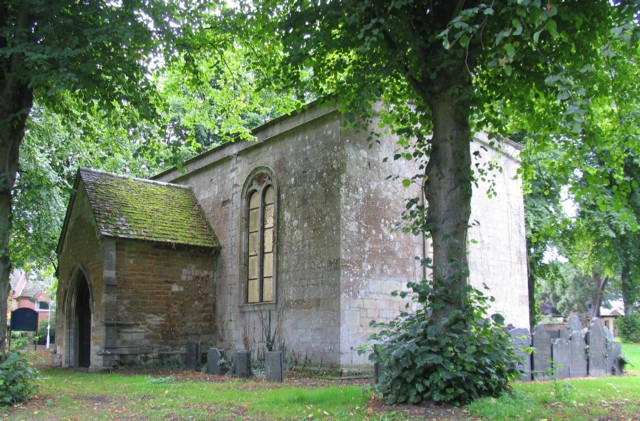
St Mary in Arden

In 1786, William Hubbard left a bequest of one guinea a year for the parish church choristers to sing the Easter Hymn over his grave. On every Easter Sunday, the Market Harborough Parish Church choristers still continue the tradition. The gravestone is 51 inches tall, a simple square stone with an ornate inscription and decoration, sculpted by William Walker of Market Harborough. The gravestone inscription is "This stone is erected in the memory of Ann wife of William Hubbard who departed this life the 22nd of September 1779 in the 60th year of her age. Also of William Hubbard who departed this life the 4th of October 1786 aged 68 years."
