= Thomas Collins (cricketer, born 1895) =

English cricketer

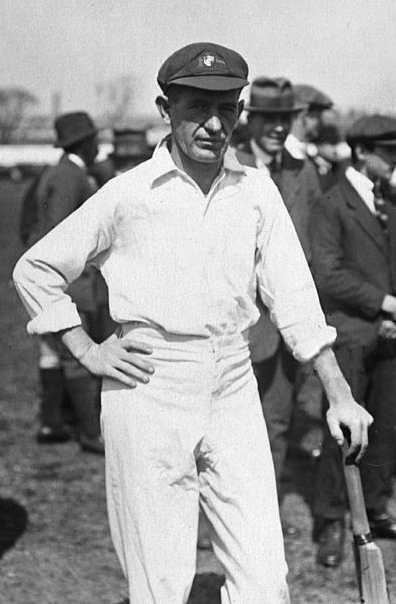

Personal information
- Full name: Thomas Hugh Collins
- Born: 4 March 1895; Nottingham, Nottinghamshire, England
- Died: 19 May 1964 (aged 69); Edwalton, Nottinghamshire, England
- Batting: Left-handed
- Bowling: Left-arm fast-medium Slow left-arm orthodox

Domestic team information
- Years: Team
- 1921: Nottinghamshire
- 1935: Hampshire

Career statistics
Competition	First-class
Matches	4
Runs scored	32
Batting average	5.33
100s/50s	–/–
Top score	13
Balls bowled	126
Wickets	4
Bowling average	20.00
5 wickets in innings	–
10 wickets in match	–
Best bowling	1/17
Catches/stumpings	2/–
- Source: Cricinfo, 30 December 2009

Thomas Hugh Collins (4 March 1895 – 19 May 1964) was an English cricketer.

Collins was born at Nottingham in March 1895. Collins made his debut in first-class cricket for Nottinghamshire against Leicestershire in the 1921 County Championship at Trent Bridge. In this match, he took the wicket of John King with his first delivery in first-class cricket. Following this match, he made a second appearance against Surrey in the County Championship. A gap of fourteen seasons would separate Collins from his next first-class appearances, when he appeared twice for Hampshire in the 1935 County Championship, against Derbyshire and Lancashire. Described by F. S. Ashley-Cooper as a "very promising left-arm fast-medium bowler with a splendid delivery" (though he also bowled slow left-arm orthodox), Collins took 4 wickets at an average of 20.00, with best figures of 1 for 17. He died in May 1964 at Edwalton, Nottinghamshire.
