= Edwalton =

Village in Nottinghamshire, England

Coordinates: 52.912°N 1.112°W

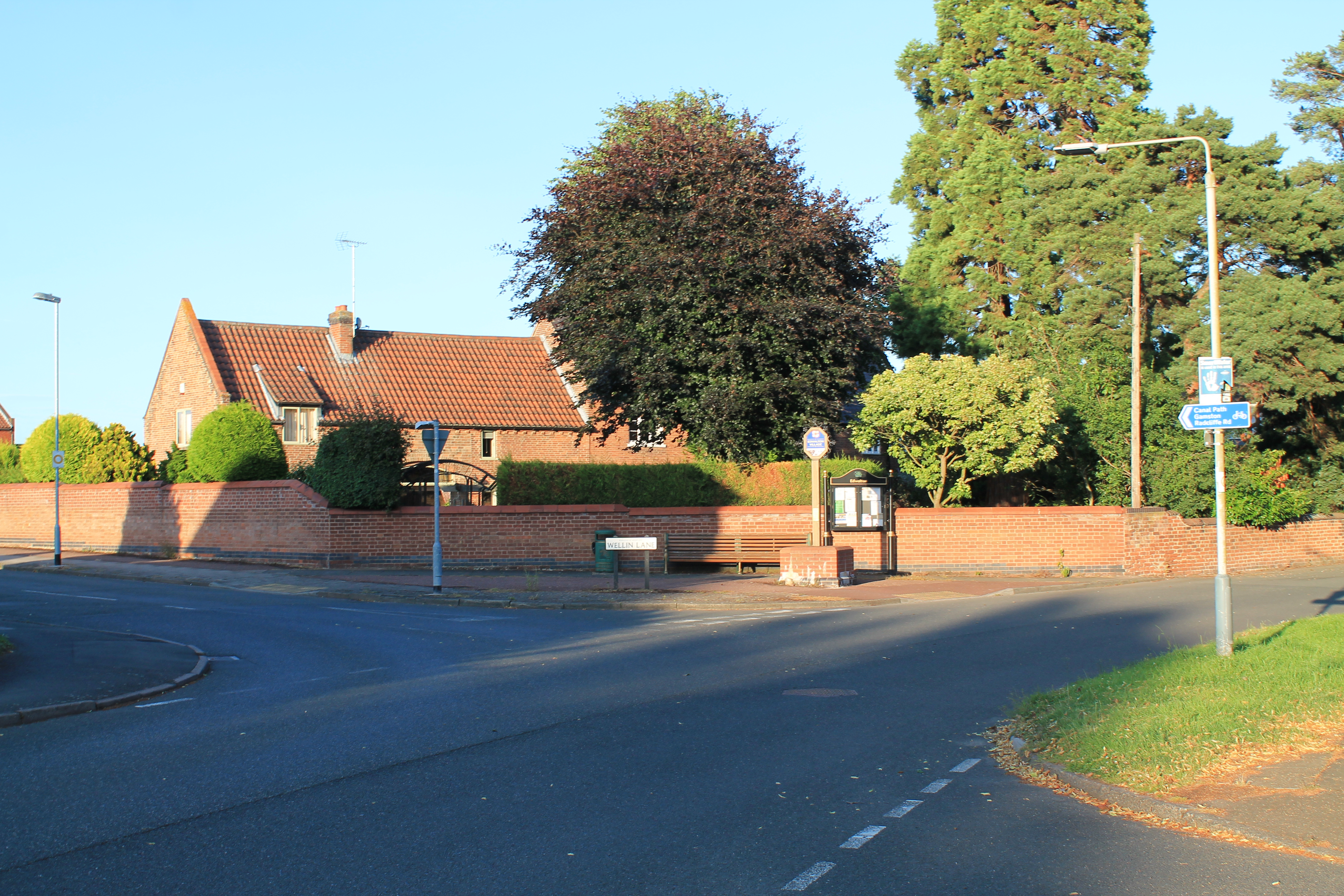
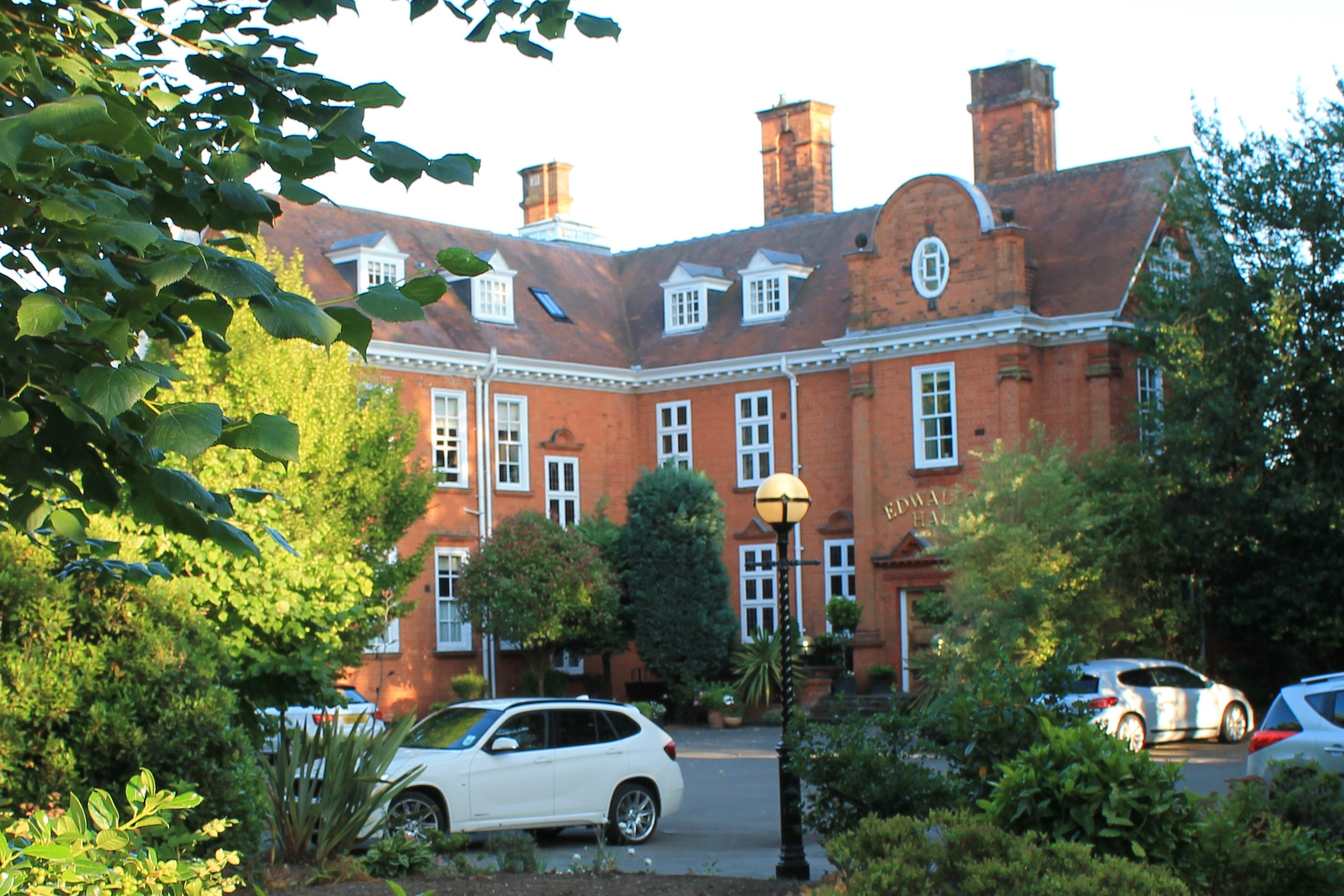
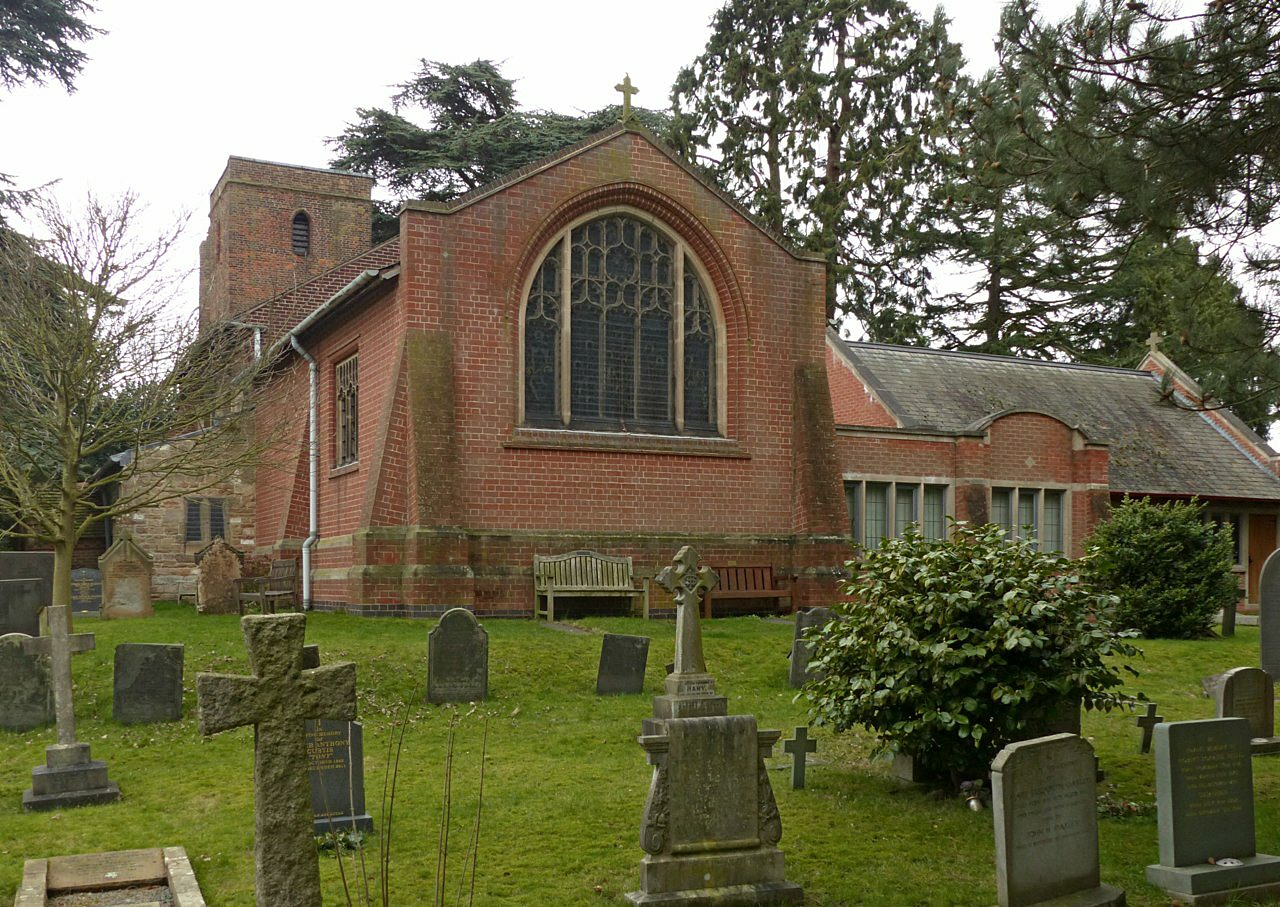
- Cherry Tree Lane Edwalton Hall Church of the Holy Rood

- Location within Nottinghamshire
- Population: 5,774 (2021 Census)
- OS grid reference: SK 59708 35357
- District: Rushcliffe
- Shire county: Nottinghamshire
- Region: East Midlands
- Country: England
- Sovereign state: United Kingdom
- Post town: NOTTINGHAM
- Postcode district: NG12
- Dialling code: 0115
- Police: Nottinghamshire
- Fire: Nottinghamshire
- Ambulance: East Midlands
- UK Parliament: Rushcliffe

Edwalton is a village in the Rushcliffe borough in Nottinghamshire, England, originating from Edwalton village. The population of the Rushcliffe Ward was 3,908 at the 2011 Census. Results from the 2021 census now indicates that the population has risen to 5,774.

Under the government’s local government reorganisation, West Bridgford, Edwalton, Ruddington, and parts of Rushcliffe surrounding areas are set to merge into the new Greater Nottingham Council in 2028.

== History ==
One of the earliest mentions of Edwalton village is in the Domesday Book where it features among lands given to Hugh de Grandmesnil by King William 1. This land required more than three ploughs and consisted of 20 acres (8.1 ha) of meadow.

After the marriage of the heir to West Bridgford's landowners, the Musters family, into the Chaworth family, the areas of West Bridgford and Edwalton were joined as West Bridgford Urban District and now as part of Rushcliffe Borough.

=== Civil parish ===
In 1931 the parish had a population of 290. On 1 April 1935 the parish was abolished and merged with West Bridgford.

=== Notable people ===
- Arthur Richardson (1860–1936), a Nottinghamshire tea merchant, elected several times as a Liberal or Labour Member of Parliament, died in Edwalton.
- Thomas Collins (1895–1964), a county cricketer for Nottinghamshire and Hampshire, died in Edwalton in 1964.

== Property ==
While the official boundaries of Edwalton are uncertain, Boundary Road is commonly accepted as the division from West Bridgford.

Edwalton contains some of Nottingham's most expensive properties: Valley Road, Melton Road, Croft Road and Village Street include properties worth over a million pounds. Edwalton Hall, the largest, was once the residence of the Chaworth family and is now an exclusive complex of mews houses and apartments. For a time it became a hotel and restaurant, before being developed by Crosby Homes. Today it includes a gym, swimming pool and croquet lawn. In recent years developers have laid out new housing estates in the area known locally as Sharphill Farm. These are primarily of high-specification family homes, with good road links for commuters.

Edwalton is varied architecturally. Landmark bespoke houses are common, but most of it is now composed of large housing estates, first built in the early 1950s, with subsequent estates added in the 1980s to the present day. Many council houses and flats were privately bought under the Right to buy scheme of the 1980s. Only a small number now belong to Rushcliffe Borough Council. Its housing stock passed in early 2003 to Spirita Housing Association. On 1 April 2012 Spirita was dissolved and ownership was taken over by Metropolitan Housing Association Group, based in London.

Plans to provide Edwalton with a parish council were rejected after a two-stage consultation process, culminating in a report issued in February 2014 by Rushcliffe Borough Council.

Edwalton has recently had an expansion which has led to a sharp population increase with several new build sites being built near the A52. Edwalton has also gained a new retail park which is situated off the A52 Wheatcroft Roundabout, this offers an Aldi supermarket, McDonald's, Costa Coffee, Subway, Greggs, a pet shop and also a nursery school. The new Porsche Centre Nottingham is now also located there within the retail park.

== Facilities ==
Edwalton has a state primary school and a golf course. There is also a general store, post office, newsagent, café, hair salon, pharmacy and a dog groomer within the main shopping area of Earlswood Drive.

The Anglican Church of the Holy Rood, Edwalton is located on Village Street. Edwalton Community Church in Wellin Lane offers community services such as a pre-school, a toddlers group, a ladies' fellowship group and children's activities, and a "Blessings in a Box" scheme for the financially challenged.

== Bus transport ==
- Nottingham City Transport
  - 5: Nottingham – West Bridgford – Edwalton
  - 5A: Nottingham – West Bridgford – Edwalton
  - 7: Nottingham – West Bridgford – Edwalton Fields
- Trentbarton
  - 'The Keyworth': Nottingham Broadmarsh – West Bridgford – Edwalton – Edwalton Fields – Tollerton – Plumtree – Keyworth
- Centrebus
  - '19': Nottingham - Trent Bridge - Melton Road - Tollerton - Melton Mowbray

== See also ==
- Listed buildings in West Bridgford
