= St Dionysius' Church, Market Harborough =

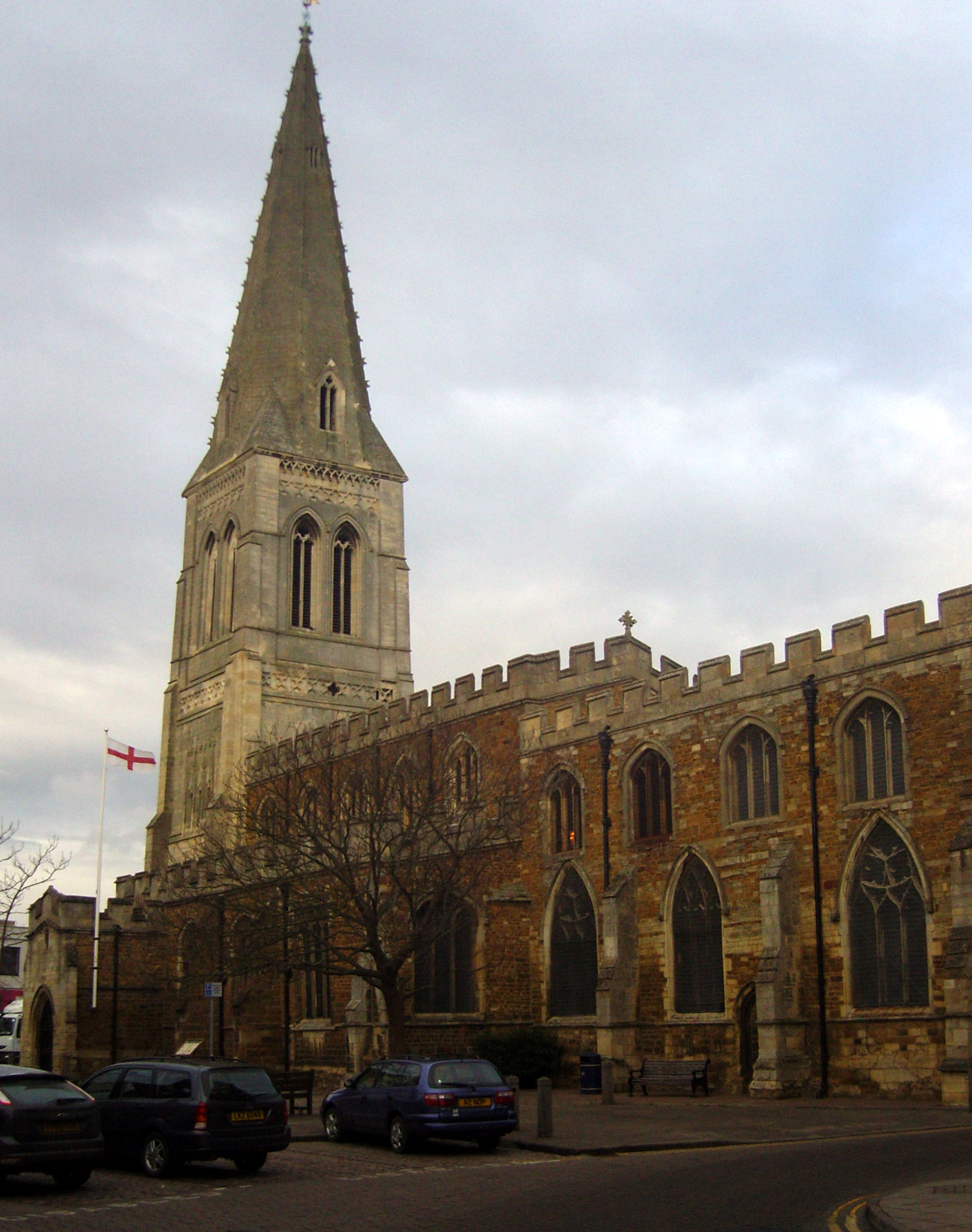
- St Dionysius' Church, Market Harborough
- St Dionysius' Church, Market Harborough
- 52.47856°N 0.92137°W
- OS grid reference: SP 73355 87285
- Location: Market Harborough
- Country: England
- Denomination: Church of England
- Website: harborough-anglican.org.uk/teamchurces-stdionysius

History
- Dedication: St Dionysius

Architecture
- Heritage designation: Grade I listed

Specifications
- Height: 154 feet (47 m)

Administration
- Diocese: Diocese of Leicester
- Archdeaconry: Leicester
- Deanery: Gartree
- Parish: Market Harborough

Clergy
- Vicar: Revd. Phil Bryson

St Dionysius' Church, Market Harborough is a Grade I listed parish church in the Church of England in Market Harborough, Leicestershire.

== History ==
The earliest parts of the church date from the 13th century, with most features dating from 14th and 15th centuries. Part of the tower was destroyed in a storm in 1735 and the replacement was several feet shorter. Restoration work was carried out in 1857 when the pews of 1751 were cut down in height to about 3 ft and the organ moved from the west gallery to a specially constructed recess. The church reopened on 8 January 1858. In 1887 the chancel and south aisle were re-roofed. In 1953 the nave roof was replaced. This was required due to Deathwatch Beetle damage.

== Organ ==
The organ was built by G.M. Holdich of London and opened on 14 July 1844. The organ was removed in 1857 by the same builder to receive repairs and was improved with an additional octave of pedals. When returned to the church it was placed on the north side of the chancel in a new recess built specially for it.

It was replaced in 1877 with a new instrument by J Porritt of Leicester. This was inaugurated on 9 August 1877. Modifications were made in 1914. A specification of the organ can be found on the National Pipe Organ Register.

=== Organists ===
- James Dixon 1851 - 1882
- Herrap Wood 1882 - 1914 (formerly organist of St James' Church, Standard Hill Nottingham)
- S.W. Heppenstall 1913 - 1918
- John W. Skempton ca. 1925 - 1938
- William (Bill) C. Wright 1938 - 1977
- Keith Matthews 1977
- David G. Davis 1977 - 1981
- David Johnson 1981 - 2022 (formerly organist at St Wilfrid’s Church, Kibworth)

== Bells ==
There are ten bells in the belfry. Eight of the bells were recast in 1901 and two new bells were added in 1990.
