= Listed buildings in West Bridgford =

West Bridgford is a town and an unparished area in the Rushcliffe district of Nottinghamshire, England. The area contains 24 listed buildings that are recorded in the National Heritage List for England. Of these, two are listed at Grade II*, the middle of the three grades, and the others are at Grade II, the lowest grade. The list includes the area of Edwalton. The listed buildings include houses and associated structures, churches and items in and around churchyards, bridges, a school, war memorials and associated structures, a drinking fountain, a parish hall and a public house.

== Key ==
Grade	Criteria
II*	Particularly important buildings of more than special interest
II	Buildings of national importance and special interest

== Buildings ==
Name and location	Photograph	Date	Notes	Grade
Church of the Holy Rood, Edwalton; 52.90918°N 1.11151°W		12th century	The church has been altered and enlarged through the centuries, and is built in stone and brick, with roofs of slate, lead and tile. It consists of a nave with a clerestory, a south aisle, a south porch, a chancel, a vestry and a west tower. The tower is in brick on a stone plinth, and has a single stage, diagonal buttresses, lancet windows, an eaves band and a parapet. The porch has dentilled eaves and a coped gable, and a doorway with an elliptical head. Inside are stone benches, and the inner doorway has a four-centred arched head and a half-round hood mould.	II*
Old Trent Bridge flood arches 52.93742°N 1.13508°W		13th century	All that is left of the medieval bridge crossing the River Trent are two flood arches sited in a traffic roundabout. They are in stone and brick and have a pointed cutwater. On the west side are two segmental arches, one double-chamfered and with the remains of a hood mould, and to the east are two semicircular arches with chamfered hood moulds.	II
St Giles Church, West Bridgford; 52.93209°N 1.12929°W		13th century	The church has been altered and extended through the centuries, it was restored and altered in 1871–72 by T. C. Hine, and there were further additions in 1896–98 and in 1911–12. It is built in stone with roofs of tile and lead, and consists of a nave with a clerestory, a north aisle and a north porch, two south aisles and a south porch, a north transept, a chancel, a vestry and a west tower. The tower has a single stage, diagonal buttresses, a moulded eaves band with two gargoyles, and an embattled parapet with crocketed corner pinnacles.	II
The Old Post Office; 52.90979°N 1.11184°W		17th century	The former post office is in red brick, partly roughcast and partly painted, and has a roof of tile and pantile with brick coped parapets. There are two storeys, a main range of three bays, a rear cross-wing to the east with a later single-storey extension with an attic, and a lean-to on the left. Most of the windows are casements, there is a square-headed dormer in the cross-wing, and the extension contains a large bow window. Inside, there are two inglenooks.	II
Headstone; 52.90895°N 1.11140°W	—	1686	The headstone in the churchyard of the Church of the Holy Rood, Edwalton is in stone. It has a shouldered arched top, and has a partly erased inscription.	II
Pair of headstones 52.90898°N 1.11151°W		1700	The headstones in the churchyard of the Church of the Holy Rood, Edwalton are in slate. Both have square heads, they are to the memory of Martha Deveral and her husband, William, who died in 1718.	II
The Hall; 52.93377°N 1.12717°W		1768–74	A country house, it was extended in 1886, and later used for other purposes. The house is in brick on a stone plinth, with stone dressings, a string course, a blocking course, a coped parapet, and a tile roof with a single coped gable. It is in two and three storeys and has a front of 15 unequal bays. The south front has a main block of three storeys and five bays, and a lower three-bay extension to the left. In the centre of the main block are three semicircular steps with handrails and twist balusters leading up to a doorway with an intermittent rusticated surround and a keystone. The windows are sashes with rusticated heads and keystones. To the right is a two-story flat-roofed extension, and beyond that is a single-storey billiard room with a three-bay blind arcade, a moulded cornice and a coped parapet.	II
Trent Bridge; 52.93848°N 1.13632°W		1868–71	The bridge was designed by Marriott Ogle Tarbotton, and carries London Road (A60 road) over the River Trent. It consists of three segmental cast iron arches, each span with pierced spandrels, a dentilled sill, and a pierced iron balustrade. In the centre of each span is a lamp standard. The piers are in Aberdeen granite, with pointed cutwaters. At each end is a pair of pylons with coats of arms and moulded square caps. At the southeast end are three round flood arches with moulded soffits. The approach walls are curved and have moulded string courses and copings.	II
Friary United Reformed Church and Sunday School; 52.93430°N 1.13339°W		1897–98	The church is in stone and brick with tile roofs. It consists of a nave with a clerestory, north and south aisles, a chancel, a vestry, and a northeast tower. The tower has a single stage, a string course, four pairs of corner buttresses, and a central buttress on each side, the corner buttresses rising to form pinnacles. On the east side are double doors, above are casement windows and at the top is a moulded and shaped embattled parapet.	II
Boundary wall and gate, St Giles Church, West Bridgford; 52.93163°N 1.12852°W	—	1898	The entrance to the churchyard is flanked by a pair of square stone gate piers with stepped gabled tops. Between them are a pair of wrought iron gates with curved tops, and an ornate overthrow with brackets and a lamp. The churchyard is enclosed by a stone wall with half-round coping, and it extends for about 45 metres (148 ft).	II
Lady Bay Junior School; 52.93827°N 1.12122°W		1899	The school is in Accrington and blue brick, on a chamfered plinth, with a sill band, and a roof of Westmorland slate with shouldered coped gables. It is in one and two storeys, with fronts of three and six bays, and it consists of two parallel classroom ranges and service buildings. The windows are a mix of sashes and casements. On the corner is a bell tower with two stages, corner buttresses, four domed turrets, and an octagonal spire surmounted by a cupola with a leaded pagoda roof and a large dragon wind vane. In the ground floor is a doorway with a mullioned fanlight and a segmental pediment.	II
Boundary wall, railing and gate, Lady Bay Junior School; 52.93843°N 1.12135°W	—	1899	The wall is in stone with chamfered coping, and it extends for about 50 metres (160 ft). It contains five square piers with chamfered plinths and square domed caps. On the wall is scrolled railing with struts, and there are two pairs of wrought iron gates.	II
Musters Road Methodist Church; 52.93292°N 1.13238°W		1899–1900	The church, designed by R. C. Sutton, is in stone with roofs of lead and slate. It consists of a nave and a chancel under a single roof, north and south aisles, north and south transepts, and a southwest tower. The tower has two stages, corner buttresses, a pair of west doors with a moulded surround, casement windows, clock faces, deep modillioneaves, and a shallow swept roof with a finial and a wind vane.	II
Boundary wall and gates, Musters Road Methodist Church; 52.93288°N 1.13269°W	—	1899	The wall and gates were designed by R. C. Sutton. The wall is in stone with square coping and rounded arrises, and it extends for about 60 metres (200 ft). It contains two pairs of square stone gate piers with moulded caps, and two pairs of scrolled wrought iron gates.	II
Meadows Suspension Bridge; 52.93328°N 1.13915°W		1906	A suspension bridge carrying a footpath over the River Trent. At each end is a stone pylon on a plinth containing a round-headed arch. From these, a steel lattice deck is suspended on steel cables. It is approached by ramps with steel railing over two round floor arches. The bridge also carries services.	II
Edwalton Hall Hotel and outbuildings 52.91088°N 1.11721°W	—	c. 1907	A house, later a hotel, that was extended in 1958. It is in brick on a chamfered plinth, with moulded brick dressings, Ionic pilasters, dentilled eaves, pedimented gables, and roofs of tile and lead. There are two storeys and attics, and eleven bays. The windows are a mix of sashes and casements, and there are flat-roofed dormers with small pediments. In the centre of the garden front is a two-storey canted bay window flanked by gabled wings, and the ground floor windows have pediments. Other features include shaped gables and Venetian windows.	II
West Bridgford War Memorial; 52.93591°N 1.13283°W		c. 1920	The war memorial stands in a triangular area at a road junction, and is in stone. It has an octagonal plinth, a base with a moulded top edge and foliate bosses, a tapered shaft with wreaths, and a crocketed finial with gabled niches. There are inscriptions and bronze plaques on the bases.	II
Birkin Mausoleum; 52.91021°N 1.14268°W	—	1921	The mausoleum in Wilford Hill Cemetery is to the memory of members of the Birkin family, lace manufacturers. It is in Portland stone and in the form of a small temple. On the west front are two Roman Doric fluted columns carrying an entablature with a pediment and an acroterion, and at the opening is a pair of low bronze gates. The east front has plain pilasters, and contains full-height bronze gates.	II
Memorial Drinking Fountain; 52.91298°N 1.14101°W		1926	The drinking fountain is to the memory of a member of the Birkin family, lace manufacturers. It is in Portland stone, and has a rectangular plinth of two steps containing a dog bowl. There is a stepped base on which is a cenotaph with a reeded stepped gabled top, containing a corbelled drinking bowl, above which is an inscribed panel. This is flanked by curved coped walls incorporating seats.	II
Nottingham Municipal War Memorial; 52.93466°N 1.14021°W		1927	The war memorial stands in the Memorial Gardens, and is in Portland stone. It consists of a tripartite arch with giant Doric columns and an inscribed frieze, above which is a parapet containing the city arms. Within the arches are three pairs of decorative wrought iron gates, and on the interior walls of the central arch are inscribed bronze plaques. The arches are flanked by curved colonnades with intermediate pedestals and contain wrought iron railings.	II
Terrace Wall, Memorial Gardens; 52.93466°N 1.14041°W		c. 1927	The retaining terrace wall on the east side of the Nottingham Municipal War Memorial is in stone, with a balustrade and dressings in reconstituted stone, and it is about 100 metres (330 ft) long. On the top is a balustrade with intermediate piers, the centre projecting and containing three segmental arches forming shelters.	II
Lutterell Hall; 52.93156°N 1.12785°W		1929	A parish hall designed by Alfred John Thraves in Arts and Crafts style. It is in red brick with dressings in plum and red brick and tile-creasing, and a tile roof that sweeps down to ground floor level and is half-hipped at the gable ends. There is a single storey and attics, and a rectangular plan with an east front of seven bays. On the north front is a large semicircular arch containing a doorway with three orders of brick, the tympanum containing metalwork with a figure in relief, and an inscribed frieze. To the right is a single-storey classroom with sprocketed eaves and a hipped roof. The bays on the east front are divided by pilasters, and each contains a segmental-arched window. In the roof are five dormers, and on the ridge is a spire with copper tiles.	II
Memorial Lychgate; 52.90952°N 1.11146°W		1932	The lych gate is in timber on a chamfered stone plinth and has a shingled hipped roof. On the roof is a Celtic cross finial, and the lintel carries an inscription.	II
Test Match Hotel; 52.92892°N 1.12534°W		1938	The public house is in buff brick on a red brick plinth and has a hipped tile roof. There are two storeys and attics, and a front of seven bays, the middle three bays projecting. In the centre is a stone portico with paired columns. Most of the windows are sashes with splayed red brick lintels, those in the middle three bays with segmental heads, curved sills and red brick surrounds, and in the attic there are round-headed dormers. The internal Art Deco furnishings have been retained.	II*
