= St Giles' Church, West Bridgford =

Church in Nottinghamshire, England

Coordinates: 52°55′55″N 1°7′47″W

St. Giles Church, West Bridgford
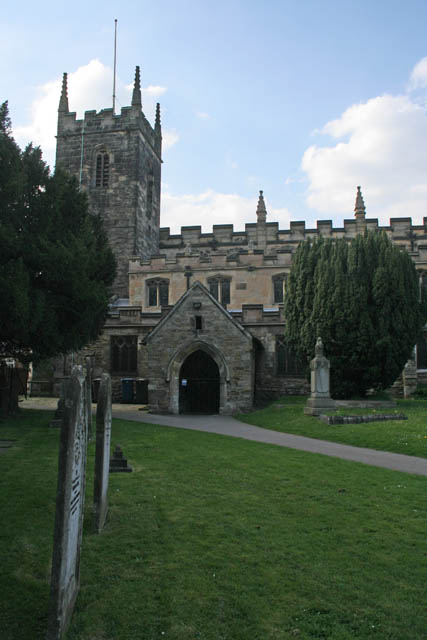

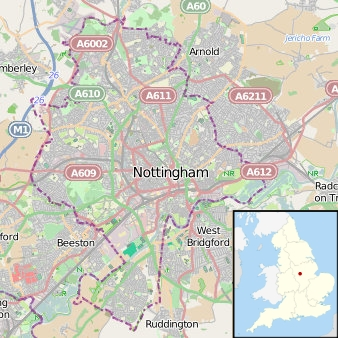
- Location in Greater Nottingham
- Country: England
- Denomination: Church of England
- Churchmanship: Open Evangelical
- Website: www.stgilesparish.com

History
- Dedication: St. Giles

Architecture
- Heritage designation

Listed Building – Grade II
- Designated: 13 December 1949
- Reference no.: 1045677

Administration
- Province: York
- Diocese: Southwell and Nottingham
- Archdeaconry: Nottingham
- Deanery: West Bingham
- Parish: West Bridgford

Clergy
- Rector: Revd. Lee Proudlove

St. Giles' Church, West Bridgford is an Anglican parish church in West Bridgford, Nottinghamshire.

The church is Grade II listed by the Department for Digital, Culture, Media and Sport as it is a building of special architectural or historic interest.

== History ==
St. Giles is a medieval church but little remains. It was restored by Thomas Chambers Hine in 1872 and again by Naylor and Sale between 1896 and 1911. The foundation stone for the restoration in 1896 was laid on 18 October 1896 by Lady Byron of Thrumpton Hall. This restoration involved a new nave and chancel at a cost of £5,500.

== Features ==
It retains a medieval screen from the late fourteenth century. There is some stained glass by James Powell and Sons.

== Organ ==
A small organ dating from 1840 was bought in 1871 from St. Stephen's Church, Sneinton. It was sold to Lady Bay Church in 1898 when the next pipe organ by Charles Lloyd and Co built at a cost of £500 (equivalent to £55,600 in 2025) was opened on 22 November 1899 Although provision was made for three manuals, only two were initially fitted with pipes as an additional £300 was required to complete the work.

It was enlarged in 1919 when it was moved to the newly constructed King George Aisle. In 1951 it was rebuilt by Henry Willis & Sons and again in 1971. It was replaced by an electronic organ in 1993. The organ console was used in the rebuilding of an organ in Trinity United Reformed Church, Wimbledon, London.

=== Organists ===
- George Gunn 1871 - 1875
- William Stevenson 1884 - 1892
- Miss Pemberton ca. 1895 - 1898
- James Buckland Lyddon 1898 - 1904
- Vernon Sydney Read 1904 - 1905
- James Buckland Lyddon 1905 - 1907
- William Ryde 1908 - ca 1912
- Mrs Hector Tomkins ca. 1912 - 1920
- Charles Bissill Morris 1920 - 1924 (afterwards organist of Castle Gate Congregational Centre)
- Dudley Newball 1924 - 1941
- John Gordon Wood 1941 - 1957
- Malcolm Boyle 1957 - 1961
- Harold Bebbington 1961 - 1965
- Walter L Rogers 1965 - 1970
- A Walter Esswood 1970 - 1984
- Fred G Munday 1985 - 1995
- Alan J Hindle 1995 - 2002
- Andrew John Rootham 2002 - 2015
- Dr Paul Bracken 2015 -

== See also ==
- Listed buildings in West Bridgford
