= Church of the Holy Rood, Edwalton =

Church in Nottinghamshire, England

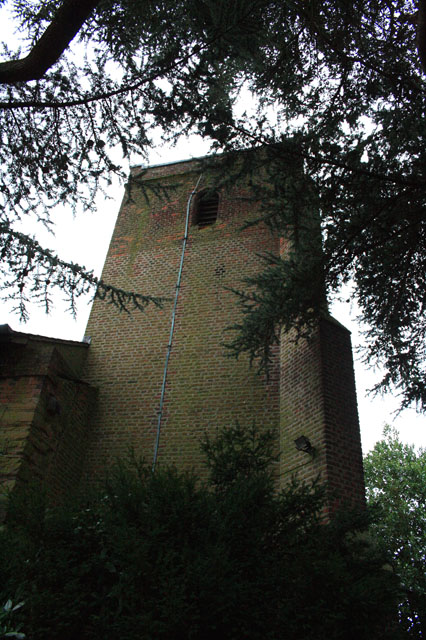
- Church of the Holy Rood, Edwalton
- 52.909230°N 1.11144°W
- OS grid reference: SK 59850 35002
- Country: England
- Denomination: Church of England
- Website: edwaltonchurch.org

History
- Dedication: Holy Rood

Architecture
- Heritage designation: Grade II* listed
- Architect(s): Arthur Brewill and Basil Baily

Administration
- Province: York
- Diocese: Diocese of Southwell
- Parish: Edwalton

Clergy
- Priest: Peter Wenham

The Church of the Holy Rood, Edwalton is a Church of England church in Edwalton, Nottinghamshire.

== History ==
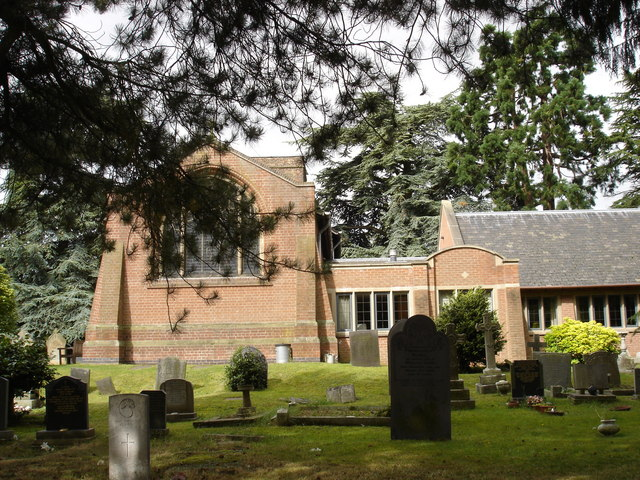
The church

The church dates from the 12th century. The chancel was rebuilt by Arthur Brewill and Basil Baily in 1894. A vestry was added by L. W. Nunn in the mid 20th century.

== Stained glass ==
On the north side are stained glass window to Thurman family, 1906, and others of 1910 and 1913 by Heaton, Butler and Bayne.

The east window has stained glass to the Turner family dating from 1918 and 1924, by Morris & Co.

South side has a stained glass window to the Halford family, c.1923.

The church also contains a stained glass window to Arthur Brewill FRIBA dating from 1923, the architect of the chancel.

== Organ ==
The church contained a small 2 manual pipe organ with 12 speaking stops dating from 1881. A specification of the organ can be found on the National Pipe Organ Register

This was replaced with a digital organ in 1988.

== See also ==
- Grade II* listed buildings in Nottinghamshire
- Listed buildings in West Bridgford
