= Market Harborough =

Town in Leicestershire, England

Coordinates: 52.4775°N 0.9206°W

- Town
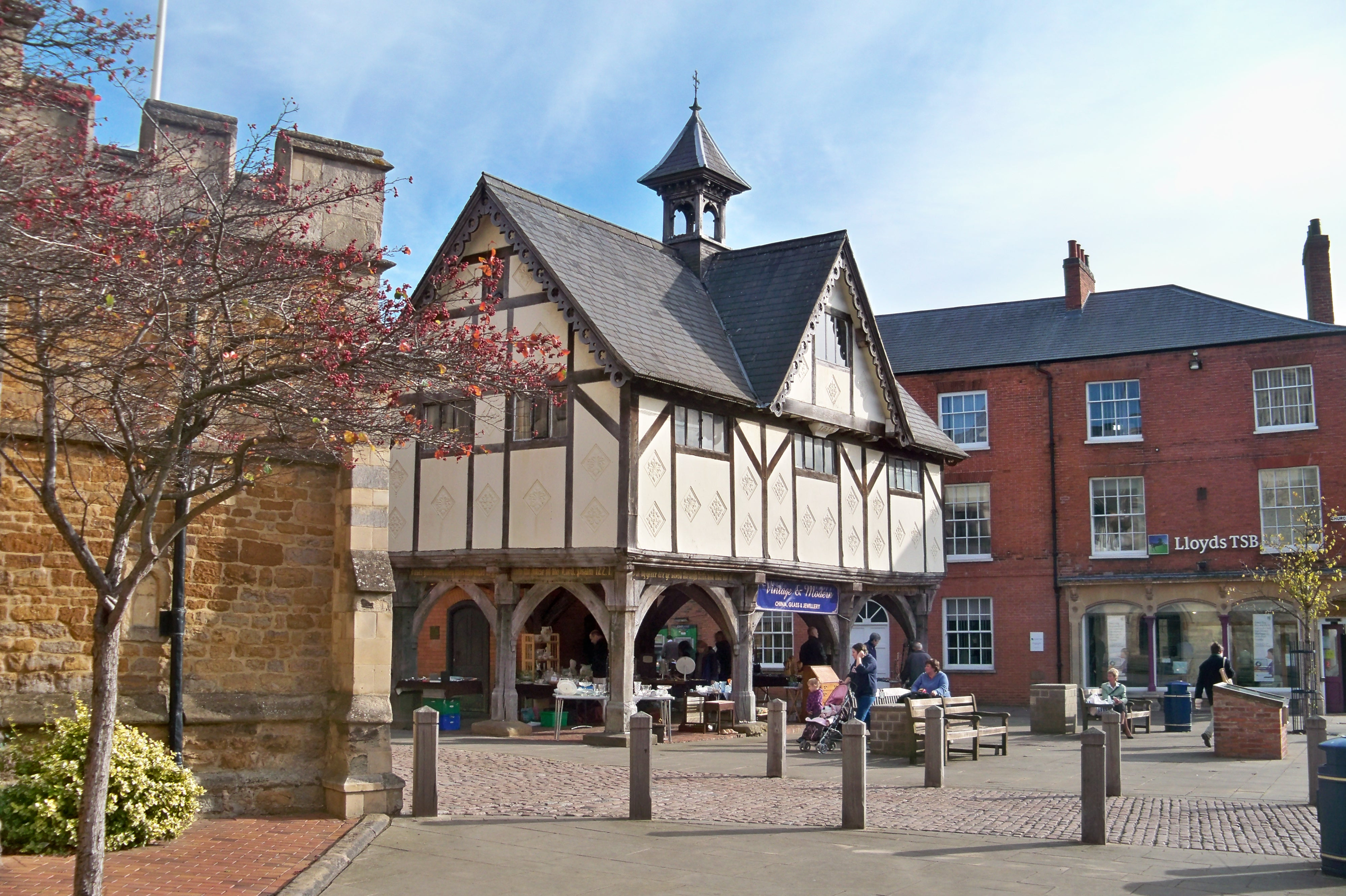
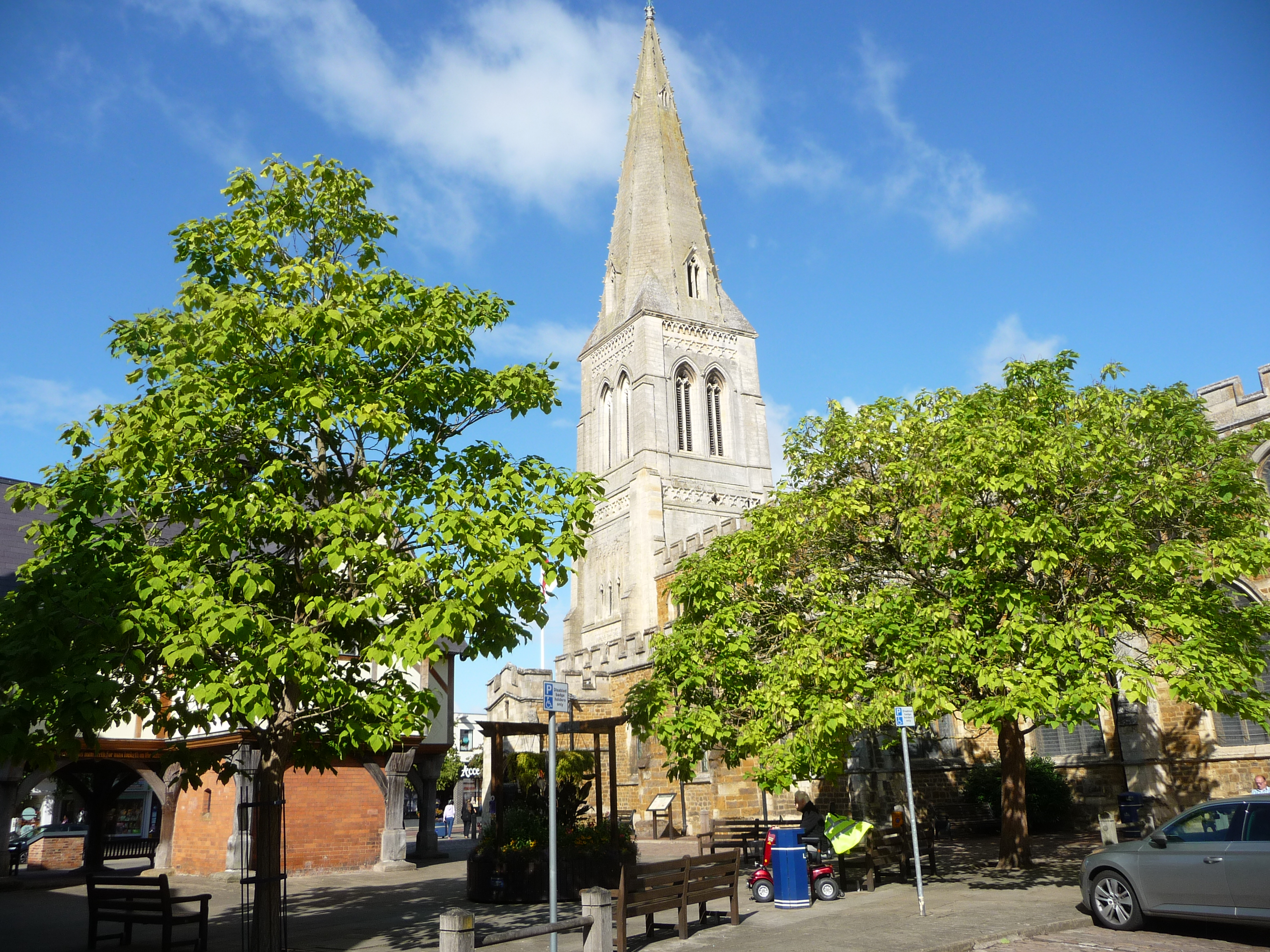
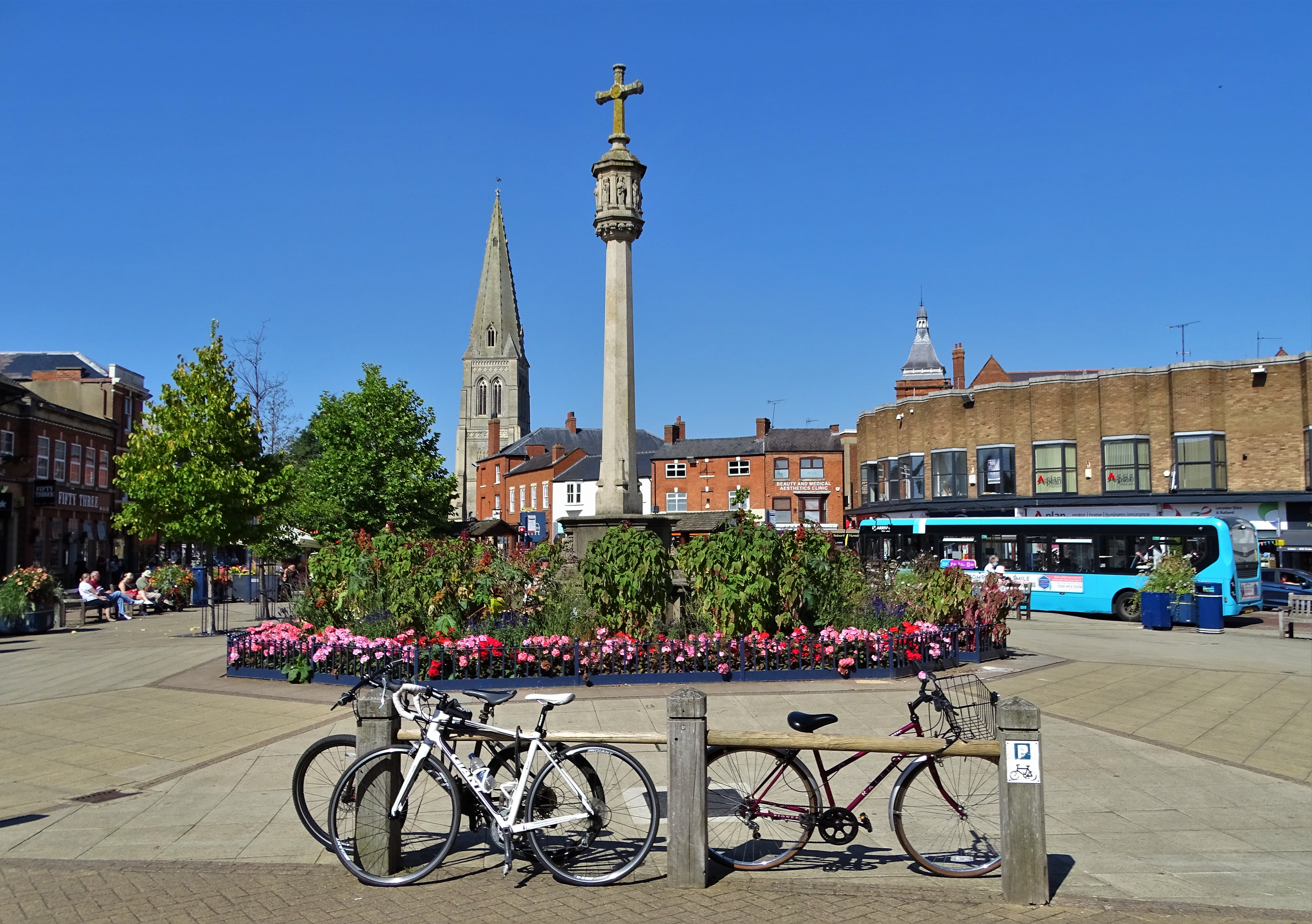
- Old Grammar School St Dionysius Church The Square

- Location within Leicestershire
- Population: 24,779 (2021 census)
- OS grid reference: SP7387
  - London: 88 miles (141.6 km)
- District: Harborough
- Shire county: Leicestershire
- Region: East Midlands
- Country: England
- Sovereign state: United Kingdom
- Areas of the town: List: Arden; Great Bowden; Little Bowden; Logan; Lubenham; Welland
- Post town: Market Harborough
- Postcode district: LE16
- Dialling code: 01858
- Police: Leicestershire
- Fire: Leicestershire
- Ambulance: East Midlands
- UK Parliament: Harborough, Oadby and Wigston

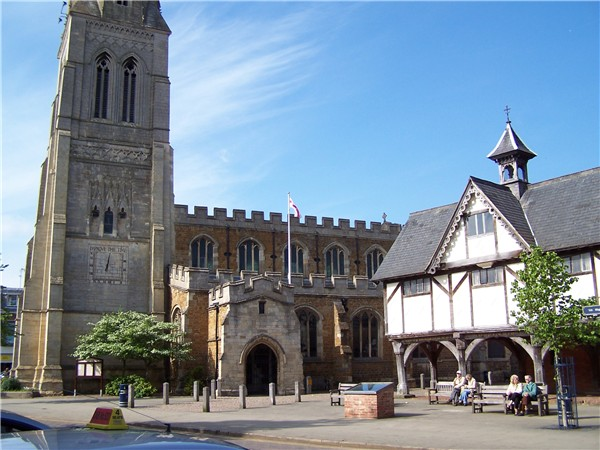
St Dionysius Church with the Old Grammar School (right)

St Mary's Place, Market Harborough

Market Harborough is a market town in the Harborough district of Leicestershire, England, close to the border with Northamptonshire. The population was 24,779 at the 2021 census. It is the administrative headquarters of the Harborough district.

Market Harborough was part of Rockingham Forest, a royal hunting forest used by medieval monarchs, whose boundaries stretched from Market Harborough to Stamford and included Corby, Kettering, Desborough, Rothwell, Thrapston and Oundle. The town was at a crossroads for both road and rail, but the A6 now bypasses it to the east and the A14 to the south. Market Harborough railway station is served by East Midlands Railway services on the Midland Main Line with direct services north to Leicester, Nottingham, Derby and Sheffield, and south to London St Pancras. Rail services to Rugby and Peterborough ended in 1966.

The steeple of St Dionysius' Church rises directly from the street, as there is no churchyard. It was constructed in grey stone in 1300 with the church itself a later building of about 1470. Next to the church stands the Old Grammar School, a small timber building dating from 1614. The ground floor is open, creating a covered market area and there is a single room on the first floor. It has become a symbol of the town. The nearby square is largely pedestrianised and surrounded by buildings of varying styles. The upper end of the High Street is wide and contains mostly unspoilt Georgian buildings.

Market Harborough has two villages within its confines: Great Bowden lies over a hill about a mile from the town centre, and Little Bowden is less than half a mile from the town centre. The three centres have largely coalesced through ribbon development and infill, although Great Bowden continues to retain a strong village identity.

== History ==
=== Before 1066 ===
Market Harborough was founded by the Saxons between 410 and 1066. Originally a small village, believed to have been called Hæfera-beorg (Harborough), meaning "oat hill".

=== 1066–1799 ===
In 1086 the Domesday Book records Bowden as a Royal Manor organised in 73 manors. The population lived in three villages, Great Bowden, Arden and Little Bowden. The Manor of Harborough is first mentioned in 1199 and 1227 when it was called "Haverberg". It is likely that Harborough was formed out of the Royal Manor with the intention of making it a place for tradesmen and a market when a new highway between Oxendon and Kibworth was established to help link Northampton and Leicester. A chapel dedicated to St Dionysius was built on the route, whilst St Mary in Arden retained Parish Church status.

A market was established by 1204 and has been held on a Tuesday ever since 1221. Eventually this market led to the modern name of Market Harborough. The tradespeople of Harborough had large tofts or farmyards at the rear of their properties where goods were made and stored. Many of these yards remain but have been subdivided down their length over the years to give frontage to the High Street.

The steeple of Harborough Church was started in 1300 and completed in 1320. It is a broach spire, which rests on the walls of the tower, and are earlier than recessed spires which rise from behind a square tower as at Great Bowden. By 1382 the village of Arden had been abandoned, although the church remained in use for some years. In 1470 the main part of Harborough Church was completed. An open stream ran down the High Street. The Town Estate was created and managed by a body of Feoffees elected by the townspeople, to help manage among other things the open fields surrounding the town, the proceeds from which were used for a variety of purposes. In 1569 the town was briefly in the news as the Privy Council debated whether a local girl, Agnes Bowker, had given birth to a cat. From 1570 the Town Estate owned several properties within the town.

Harborough figured nationally in the English Civil War in June 1645, when it became the headquarters of the King's Army. In Harborough, the King decided to confront Parliamentary forces who were camped near Naseby, but the Battle of Naseby proved a decisive victory for Parliament led by Oliver Cromwell. Harborough Chapel became a temporary prison for the captured forces. Cromwell wrote a letter from "Haverbrowe, June 14, 1645" to the Speaker of the House of Commons, William Lenthall, announcing the victory.

An independent church was established in the Harborough area following the Act of Uniformity 1662, and a meeting house was built in Bowden Lane in 1694.

During the 18th century the timber mud and thatch buildings of the town were largely replaced with brick buildings. After roads were turnpiked and regularly repaired (making wheeled traffic easier all year round) Harborough became a staging point for coach travel on the road to London from the northwest and the Midlands. In 1776 the Open Fields of Great Bowden were allotted to individual owners and fenced with hedges planted, followed by those of Little Bowden in 1780.

=== 1800–1899 ===
In the 19th century, the increasing level of heavy goods traffic on the turnpike roads led to complaints. A plan for a canal from Leicester to join the London to Birmingham canal was mooted but it eventually bypassed the town and a branch canal was cut from Foxton to Harborough, with wharves at Gallow Hill and Great Bowden. Harborough wharf, to the north of the town, became a distribution centre for coal and corn. A gas company was formed in 1833 to make and distribute gas. John Clarke and Sons of London built a factory for spinning worsted and later making carpets. Other industries developed were a brickworks, brewery, wheelwright/coachworks and the British Glues and Chemicals works by the Canal at Gallow Hill. In the 1830s a union of parishes around Market Harborough was formed to look after the poor and a workhouse was built in 1836 on the site of St Luke's Hospital. In 1841 Thomas Cook who was a wood turner and cabinet maker in the town organised the first group travel by rail from Leicester to Loughborough and went on to found the travel agency bearing his name.

Market Harborough became a centre for fox hunting with hounds during the 19th century, when Mr Tailby of Skeffington Hall established a hunt in southeast Leicestershire in 1856. The country between Billesdon and Harborough was considered severe, involving jumping the specially designed ox fences. His hunting diary is recognised as an important document in the history of hunting. The Hunt was renamed the Fernie after a subsequent Master.

The Grand National Hunt Steeple Chase was held to the southwest of the town in 1860, 1861 and 1863. This race and the meeting eventually developed into the Cheltenham Festival and the organisers were part of the founding of organised steeplechasing through the Grand National Hunt Committee.

The building of the Leicester–Rugby railway in 1840 had a catastrophic effect on the coaching traffic through the town. A railway did not serve the town until 1850 with a link to Rugby, but this was quickly followed by links to Leicester and London in 1857, and to Northampton in 1859.

In 1850, William Symington, a grocer in the town established a factory to make pea-flour. His brother James developed a haberdashery and stay making business and in 1876 his sons acquired the old carpet factory to make corsets. They expanded it by three additional floors in 1881 and then built a new factory opposite Church Square in 1884 which still remains today as the Council offices, library and museum. In the 1890s the Harborough Rubber Company and Looms Wooden Heels works were established. A tannery was built on land adjoining the Commons.

In 1898, Walter Haddon opened the Caxton Works type foundry on Lathkill Street. The company later diversified into the manufacture of lead acid batteries, changing its name to Tungstone Products. The factory closed in 2002.

There was a rapid expansion in the town's population from 4,400 in 1861 to 7,700 in 1901. This had been at the expense of living conditions, with severe overcrowding in the old town. Rows of cottages had been built in the yards of older houses with shared access to water and waste disposal. The Public Health Act 1875 required local authorities to implement building regulations, or byelaws, which insisted that each house should be self-contained, with its own sanitation and water. In 1883 a new system of sewers was laid, and piped water supplied from wells at Husbands Bosworth. Additional residential areas were developed – the New Harborough estate off Coventry Road and the Northampton Road estate between Nithsdale Avenue and Caxton Street.

=== 1900–1999 ===
In 1888 Little Bowden parish was transferred from Northamptonshire to Leicestershire and following the Local Government Act 1894, an urban district council was formed for Market Harborough, covering the town and the parishes of Little and Great Bowden. Various schemes were implemented to improve the town. It acquired the gas company and built a public baths. It acquired land for the construction of Abbey Street in 1901, which removed the multi-occupied yard of the Coach and Horses Inn and enabled the building of a fire station on the new street in 1903. In the same year a new livestock market was opened between Springfield Street and the river on 12 acres (4.9 ha) of land, enabling the cattle and sheep markets to be cleared from the streets. In 1905 the council bought land at Great Bowden and Little Bowden for recreation grounds.

In 1919 there were still around 150 dwellings identified as unfit for human habitation mostly in the yards and courts of Harborough and there was an identified need for 300 new houses. Land to the north of the town was selected and a scheme for 98 homes for rent developed as the Bowden Fields Estate. Following the introduction of mortgage subsidy, over 100 private homes were built and a further development of 72 rented homes took place. By 1928 about 400 houses had been built since 1918, 164 by the council. A major improvement took place from 1930 with the acquisition of land between Northampton Road and Farndon Road. This enabled the construction of Welland Park Road (which enabled east west traffic to bypass the town centre), provision of 100 homes for rent along Welland Park Road and 52 in Walcot Road to rehouse occupants of the old yard houses, plots for private housing, the layout of Welland Park and the construction of Welland Park School.

On 23 October 1936, the town hosted the members and entourage of the Jarrow March.

A covered market hall was opened at the western end of the Cattlemarket in 1938, replacing the market stalls on the Square on Tuesdays and Saturdays.

The post-war period saw another shortage of housing and some 600 people on the waiting list for council housing. The council developed a 100-dwelling extension to the Bowden Fields Estate by 1949 and acquired 140 acres (0.57 km^{2}) of land to the southwest of the town to deal with the problem. A new Southern Estate was planned to accommodate 700 dwellings, shopping centre, school and recreation ground. The Council laid initial access roads named after personalities of the Battle of Naseby since these fields were crossed by both armies on 14 June 1645. A plaque now records the events and was unveiled by Mrs H. B. Lenthall on 1 February 1951 to mark the opening of the estate development. Around 150 dwellings were built for rent with the remaining plots available for private building. The final phase of development occurred in the 1980s.

In 1950 the canal basin was the venue for a week-long National Festival of Boats, the first such festival organised by the Inland Waterways Association and marking the beginning of the revival of the canal network for leisure use. The old brewery site was acquired for a bus station in 1951 and in 1958 a main car park was opened at the Commons and further car parks established in the 1960s to deal with the increasing demand. Proposals for development of an industrial estate at Riverside and Rockingham Road were approved in 1962 and the area developed during the 1960s.

Following serious flooding in the town centre on 2 July 1958, a flood relief scheme was begun, and the riverbed was straightened and deepened.

In 1968 the centre of Market Harborough was declared a conservation area. Major developments included the development of headquarters for Golden Wonder crisp makers, and the demolition of the old Symington factory in Adam and Eve Street for redevelopment as Eden Court shops and flats.

During the 1970s, draft proposals were made for an inner relief road to avoid traffic congestion in the town centre. However, it was rejected in favour of a bypass outside the town.

In 1980 the Symington's factory at Church Square was redeveloped as the District Council offices, library and museum. Plans for an A6 by-pass were approved by the Department for Transport during the 1980s and the 5 miles (8.0 km) road costing £9.5m was opened in June 1992. In addition, proposals were made for a new east–west link road (A14) between the A1 and M1 and a route was identified 10 miles (16 km) south. It was opened in summer 1991. The opening of these roads has reduced considerably the volume of heavy goods vehicles passing through the town centre.

Associated improvements to the town centre took place as part of a "By-pass Demonstration Project" completed in 1994. This involved comprehensive re-paving and new street furniture to make the centre more pedestrian friendly whilst through-traffic with a 20 mph (32 km/h) speed limit.

In 1993 the former cattle market, bus station, indoor market and several properties next to the old post office and the former Peacock Hotel were re-developed to form a new pedestrianised shopping centre called St Mary's Place. This included a Sainsbury's supermarket.

=== 2000 onwards ===
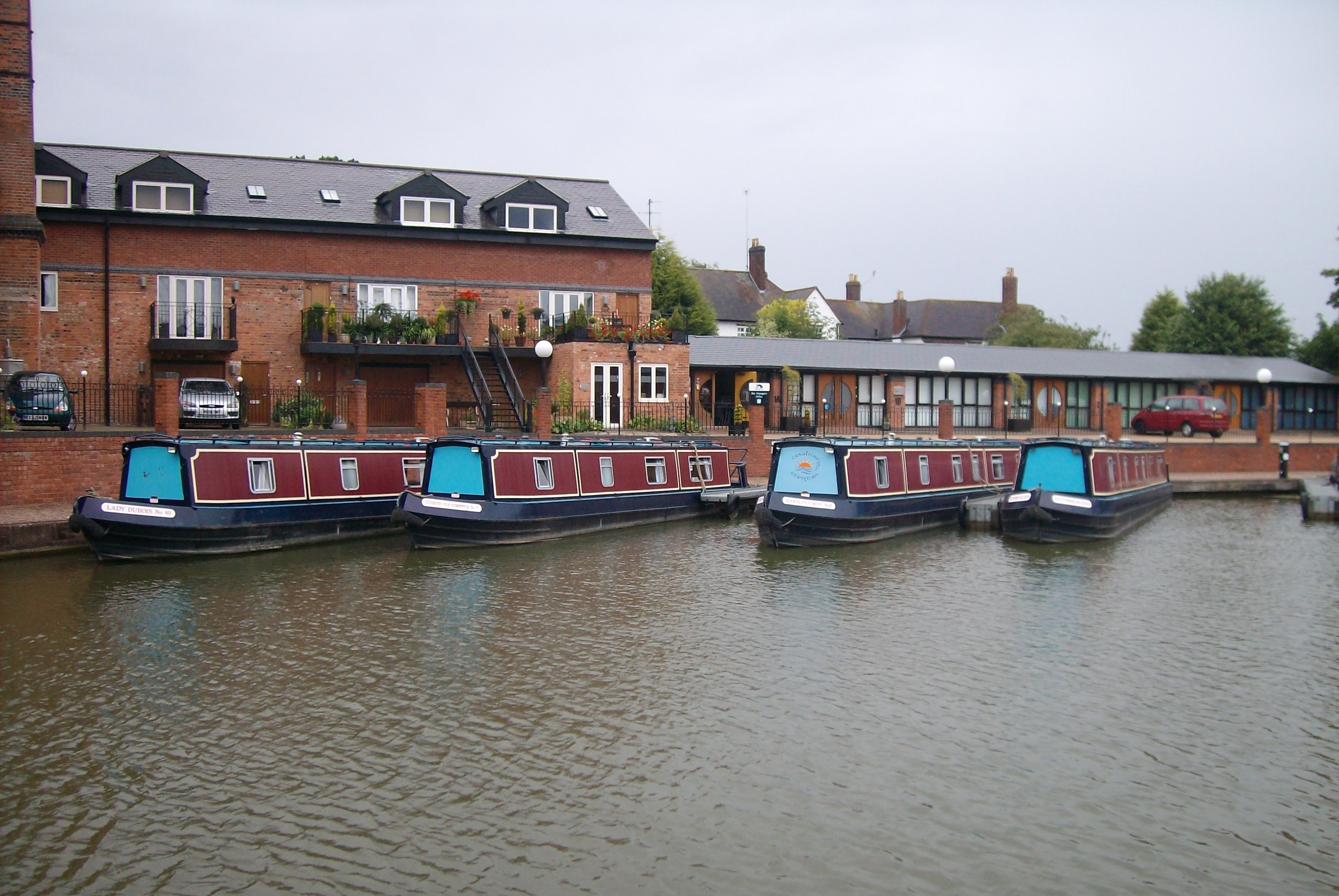
Canal basin

A footpath and cycleway alongside the canal to Foxton became part of the National Cycle Network Route 6. The path continues south following the Brampton Valley Way, a long and narrow recreation area on the route of the former railway line to Northampton.

The canal basin was restored as a boating centre called Union Wharf. This consists of workshops, restaurant, studios and flats. There are residential moorings and canal boats can be hired.

A cycle and footway along the river through the town was created called the Millennium Mile and links Welland Park with the railway station. In 2007 Welland Park was awarded Green Flag Award status and in 2008 a large new children's play area was opened.

In 2016 Welland Park Academy enrolled GCSE students and Robert Smyth Academy enrolled Year 7's.

== Geography ==
Market Harborough is in a rural part of southeast Leicestershire, on the River Welland and close to the Northamptonshire border. The town is about 15 miles (24.1 km) south of Leicester via the A6, 17 miles (27.4 km) north of Northampton via the A508 and 10 miles (16.1 km) northwest of Kettering. The town is near the A14 road running from the M1/M6 motorway Catthorpe Interchange to Felixstowe. The M1 is about 11 miles (17.7 km) west via the A4304 road.

The Midland Main Line railway connects to London St Pancras. A branch of the Grand Union Canal terminates in the north part of the town and connects to the main canal near Foxton and the Foxton Locks. (see below)

== Governance ==
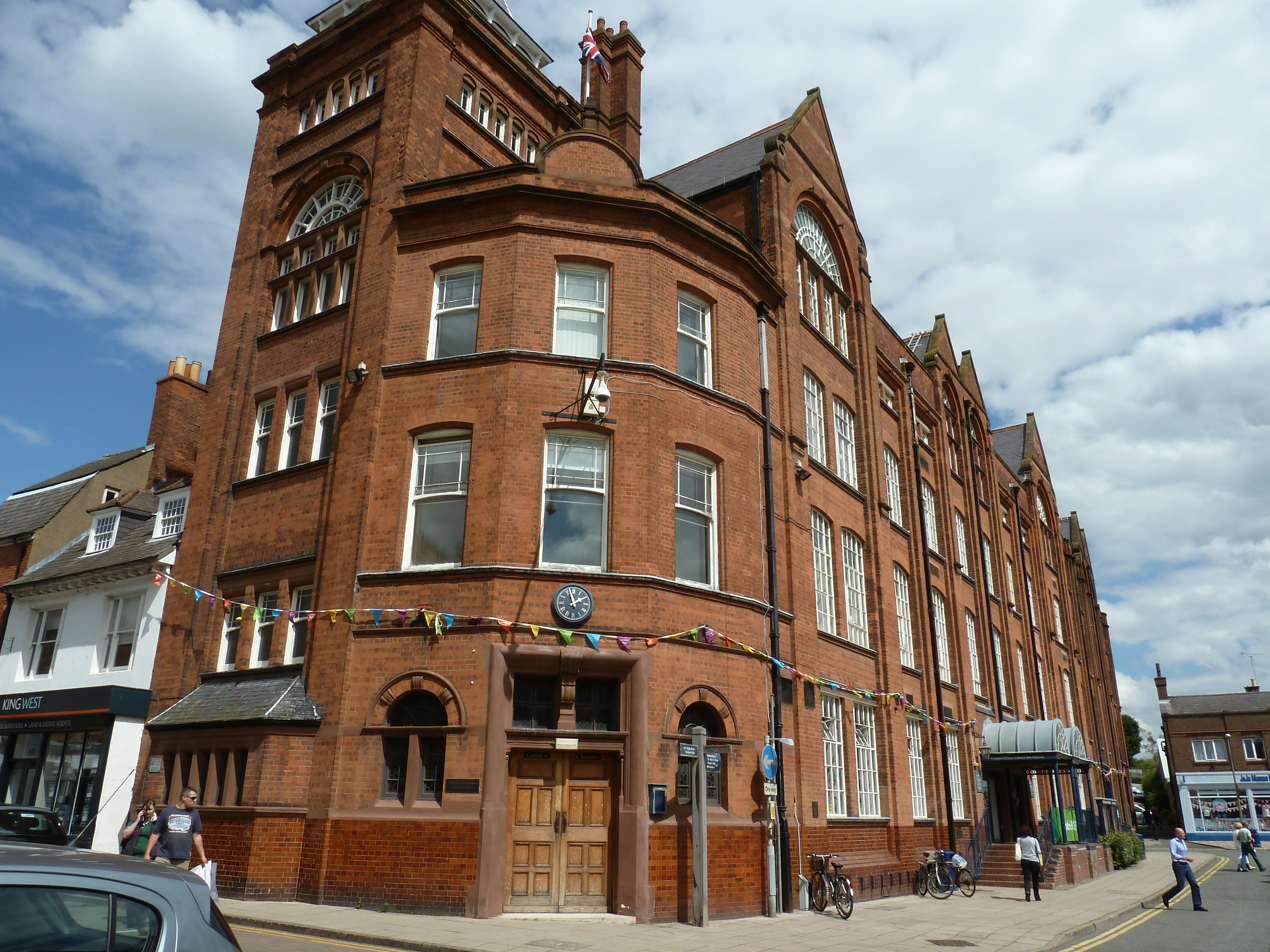
Symington Building, Adam and Eve Street: headquarters of Harborough District Council.

There are two tiers of local government covering Market Harborough, at district and county level: Harborough District Council and Leicestershire County Council. The district council has its offices at the Symington Building, a former corset factory, in the town centre. The town is an unparished area and therefore has no parish council.

=== Administrative history ===
Market Harborough was historically a chapelry in the parish of Great Bowden. The chapelry became a separate civil parish in 1866. In 1879 a local government district was created covering the three parishes of Market Harborough, Great Bowden, and Little Bowden (except the hamlet of Little Oxendon from the latter parish). When elected county councils were established in 1889, local government districts were placed entirely in one county, and so the Little Bowden area of the district was transferred from Northamptonshire to Leicestershire in 1889. Local government districts were reconstituted as urban districts in 1894.

In 1946 the urban district council was gifted a large house called Brooklands at 34 Northampton Road by the Symington family, local factory owners. The building was subsequently converted to become the council's headquarters.

Market Harborough Urban District was abolished in 1974 to become part of the new Harborough District. No successor parish was created for the former urban district and so it became an unparished area. A new parish of Great Bowden was subsequently created from the unparished area in 1995. Harborough District Council continued to use the old urban district council's offices at Brooklands until 1980, when it bought the old Symington's corset factory in the town centre and converted it to become its headquarters.

=== Constituency ===
Market Harborough is represented as part of the Harborough, Oadby and Wigston parliamentary constituency, which includes surrounding rural areas, as well as the urban areas of Oadby, Wigston and South Wigston, and southern suburbs of Leicester.

== Landmarks ==
=== The Old Grammar School ===
There is an unusual former grammar school in the town centre which stands on wooden stilts. The school room was built upon posts to allow the butter market to be held on the ground floor. The school was founded in 1607 and built in 1614, through the generosity of Robert Smyth, a poor native of the town who became Comptroller of the Lord Mayor's Court of the City of London and member of the Merchant Taylors' Company.

The subjects taught were Latin, Greek and Hebrew, and many boys were sent to Oxford and Cambridge universities. Amongst them were John Moore, who became Bishop of Norwich in 1691, and Bishop of Ely in 1707 and William Henry Bragg, Nobel Prize winner.

The grammar school has since moved sites and is now the Robert Smyth Academy for 11- to 18-year-olds. The school's coat of arms represents the City of London, a Tudor Rose and the grammar school. The school is divided into houses, known as Bragg, Logan, Moseley and Hammond.

=== Other landmarks ===
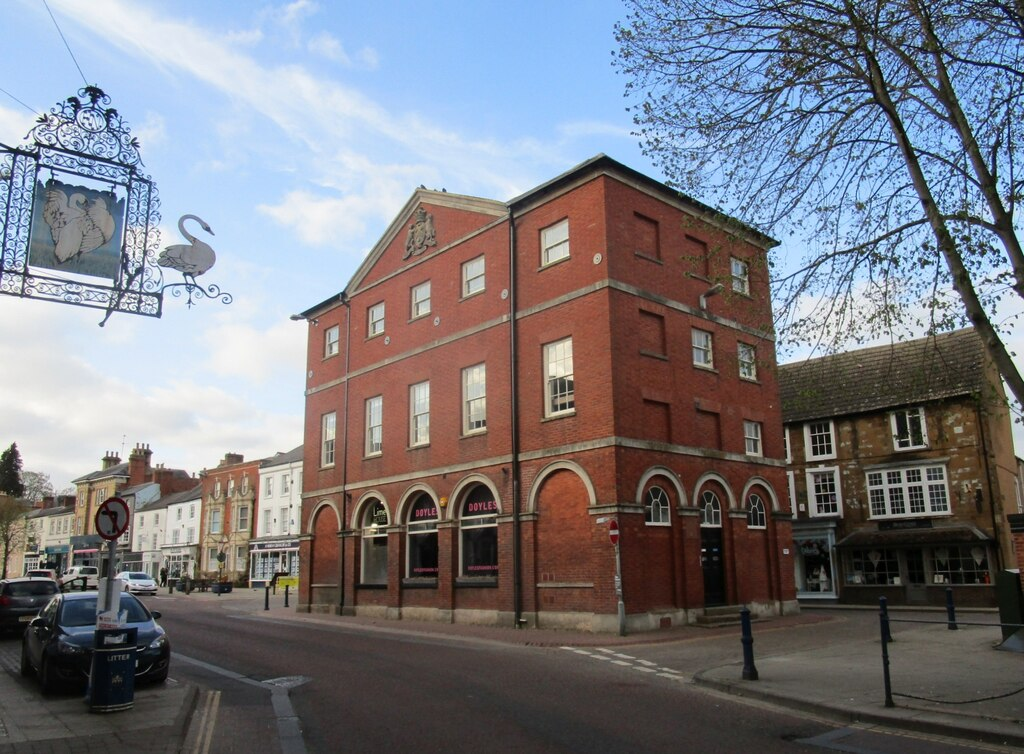
Market Harborough Town Hall

- St Dionysius Church
- Market Harborough Town Hall
- The Old Fire Station, Abbey Street
- The Harborough Museum is in part of what was once Symington's Corset Factory and shares the building with the council offices and library. The museum opened in 1983 and collects and displays objects and finds of local interest, including the Hallaton Treasure, the largest hoard of British Iron Age coins ever found.
- St Mary in Arden Church. Established before the 13th century, the existing remains are part of the later 17th century church built on the same site.
- St Mary's Place and the Settling Rooms. In 1993 the former cattle market, bus station, indoor market and several properties adjacent to the old post office and the Peacock Hotel were re-developed to form a new pedestrianised shopping centre called St Mary's Place.
- Former Flour Mills, St Mary's Road

== Places nearby ==
=== Foxton Locks ===
Three miles northwest of the town is Foxton Locks – ten canal locks consisting of two "staircases" each of five locks, on the Leicester line of the Grand Union Canal. It is named after the nearby village of Foxton where there is one of a very few remaining road swing bridges over the canal.

=== RAF Market Harborough ===
Royal Air Force Station Market Harborough opened in 1943 with its main tenant being the Wellington Bombers of No. 14 Operational Training Unit of RAF Bomber Command. In addition, the station hosted No. 1683 (Bomber) Defence Training Flight from February 1944 operating Hawker Hurricanes and Curtiss Tomahawks. Flying operations ceased on the station on 18 August 1945, following which it was placed on care & maintenance before being transferred to the British Army in 1948, becoming 72 Brigade Vehicle Depot. The army left the station in the late 1950s and today part of the former military site is occupied by HMP Gartree, with the rest given over to agriculture.

=== Gartree Prison ===
HM Prison Gartree is west of the town near Foxton and the site of a prisoner escape by helicopter in 1987. The prison caters for prisoners on life sentences.

== Economy ==
There are 4,750 VAT or PAYE registered businesses in the Harborough district. Compared to the United Kingdom the Harborough district has a greater proportion of smaller organisations with fewer than 10 employees; 87.16% vs. 82.8% in the UK overall.

CDS Global have their UK office at Tower House on Sovereign Park, off the A508 – Northampton Road towards the leisure centre. They are a data management company, mostly dealing with magazine subscriptions. The company is owned by the Hearst Corporation who publish magazines such as Cosmopolitan and Esquire. Hearst Magazines UK have their UK address at the Market Harborough office. The worldwide head office is in Des Moines, Iowa, US.

Golden Wonder was based at Edinburgh House from 1970 until 2006 when it went into administration under Kroll. The former headquarters has become a Travelodge.

The Leicestershire, Northamptonshire and Rutland branch of the NFU was in the town from 1975.

== Culture ==
=== Music and theatre ===
Market Harborough has an Orchestra and The Harborough Collective, a professional classical ensemble formed by violinist David le Page. BabyGigs is a local initiative bringing live classical music performed by professional players to babies and young children. The Great Bowden Recital Trust is a charitable music organisation.

The town's brass band, The Harborough Band, was formed in 1897 and Market Harborough Choral Society is also long established.

The town is home to The Harborough Singers, a chamber choir. Other choirs include The Dolly Mixtures, the Songbirds ladies' choir, the 90-strong choir of the Great Bowden Recital Trust and a Rock Choir.

Market Harborough Musical Theatre has been active since 1948. Its theatre is located close to St. Dionysius' Church. The theatre is also home to Parsnips Youth Theatre and Octagon films, a club where residents may view films. From 1939 until 1978 the town had a cinema known as the Ritz, now demolished and replaced with residential apartments and shops.

Live music gigs take place at a number of venues and pubs across the town including Joules Yard, The Nag's Head, the Congregational Hall and the Waterfront.

=== Art ===
An art club has existed in the town since 1963, known as the Market Harborough Art Club, meetings were at one time held on the last Friday of each month (except August and December) at the Langton Room of the Congregational Church Centre in Bowden Lane, but are currently held in the Youth Wing of the Methodist Church in Northampton Road on the first Monday of each month at 7:30pm.^{[11]} Harborough Artists Cluster is a group of artists, photographers and makers who open their Studios every September. Arts Fresco is a free street theatre festival that, for one day every September, transforms the town centre into the biggest street arts festival in the Midlands.

== Sport and leisure ==
Rugby: Market Harborough RUFC was founded in 1923 in the village of Kibworth and was originally named "Kibworth RUFC". They continued to play in the village (located approximately 6 miles northwest of Harborough) until 1957 when they moved to Gores Lane in town. A later move in 1989 saw them settle in their current home on Northampton Road.

The club retained the name of Kibworth until 2006 when a unanimous decision to change the name to that of Market Harborough was made by the club board.

Nowadays the club's facilities include seven pitches, a training area, a gym and a large clubhouse.

Football: Market Harborough has two teams: Harborough Town and Borough Alliance. Both cater for a variety of ages. Harborough Town has three senior teams, including a women's team. The Northampton Road clubhouse has received Football foundation, council and Bowden's Charity grants and awards, as well as sponsorship money, for improvements. Borough Alliance FC was founded in 2003 playing at Meadowdale School before moving to Symington's recreation ground in 2007.

Cricket: Market Harborough Cricket Club has two cricket teams; Market Harborough CC and Harborough South CC. The former plays in the Leicestershire Premier Cricket League.

Hockey: Market Harbrough Hockey Club (MHHC) are based in the town and participate in winter and summer leagues. The club offers competitive hockey as well as social hockey. There are three men's teams, three ladies teams, a mixed team, and a mixed U16 Badgers team.

Squash and Racketball Club. Located in Fairfield Road, it has five courts and a bar area. In 2017 the club was awarded National Club of the Year Award by The Squash Player Magazine.

Golf: Market Harborough Golf Club sits to the south of the town itself; much of the golf course crosses over into Northamptonshire and is only about a mile from the Northants village of Great Oxendon. It is an 18-hole course and was set up in 1898.

Running and Athletics: Harborough AC meets every Tuesday at 7.00pm at the Market Harborough Rugby Club. The club caters for all abilities of runner from beginner to experienced club runners and provides coaching for road, cross country and track running. The club also runs a Junior Section.

Leisure: The Market Harborough leisure centre has a swimming pool, gym, sauna, steam room and café and is open to members and non-members. There are two skateparks: one in Little Bowden and one in the grounds of the youth centre on Farndon Road.

== Transport ==
=== Rail ===
Market Harborough railway station is on the Midland Main Line and operated by East Midlands Railway. London St Pancras is 56 minutes south. Northbound trains operate to Leicester, Nottingham, Derby and Sheffield.

=== Bus ===
Most bus services around the town are operated by Centrebus under contract from Leicestershire County Council, while Arriva Midlands operate route X3 into Leicester, and Stagecoach in Northamptonshire operate route X7 between Northampton and Leicester.

A community bus also operates around the town.

== Media ==
The local newspaper, the Harborough Mail, founded in 1854, is the oldest media outlet in the area. Published every Thursday, it became part of the JPI Media Group in 2018. It covers south Leicestershire and north Northamptonshire with a mix of local news and sport. It was originally published in broadsheet format, becoming a tabloid in 1942.

Local radio stations are BBC Radio Leicester, Capital, Smooth Radio and HFM. HFM was formed in November 1994 to provide a local FM station for Market Harborough and South Leicestershire. Ofcom awarded the station a full-time licence on 15 July 2005. It is run largely by volunteers but has some freelance presenters.

Local news and television programmes are provided by BBC East and BBC East Midlands on BBC One, and ITV Anglia and ITV Central on ITV1. Television signals are received from either the Sandy Heath or Waltham TV transmitters.

Market Harborough Magazine is a glossy monthly publication covering Market Harborough and its surrounding area.
