= Listed buildings in Nottingham (Radford and Park ward) =

Radford and Park ward is a former electoral ward in the city of Nottingham, England. The ward contained over 160 listed buildings that are recorded in the National Heritage List for England. Of these, four are listed at Grade I, the highest of the three grades, four are at Grade II*, the middle grade, and the others are at Grade II, the lowest grade. The ward was to the west of the city centre, extending to the northwest, it included the areas of Radford and The Park, and it is mainly residential.

The most important buildings in the ward are the remains of Nottingham Castle, and the ducal palace built within its walls, later converted into Castle Museum and Art Gallery. These buildings are listed together with structures within the original grounds of the castle. Also in the ward are churches, including Nottingham Cathedral; many of these are listed, together with associated structures. The city is built on sandstone, and many caves have been carved into it, some of which are ornamental, and are listed. Most of the other listed buildings are houses, offices and associated structures, and the others include public houses, shops, a tunnel, a former pumping station, boundary markers, former lace and textile factories, war memorials, a school, statues and a bust, a former warehouse, a bandstand, a former nurses' home and associated structures, a waterworks depot, telephone kiosks, a former cinema, and a theatre.

== Key ==
| Grade | Criteria |
|---|---|
| I | Buildings of exceptional interest, sometimes considered to be internationally important |
| II* | Particularly important buildings of more than special interest |
| II | Buildings of national importance and special interest |

== Buildings ==
| Name and location | Photograph | Date | Notes | Grade |
|---|---|---|---|---|
| Nottingham Castle Middle Bridge, archway and porter's lodge 52.94990°N 1.15431°W | | c. 1170 | The oldest part is the bridge spanning the middle moat of the castle, originally a drawbridge, and later altered. It is in stone and consists of a single round arch with coped parapets, and long approach ramps, and it contains cast iron gates. The archway and porter's lodge date from about 1800. The archway has a round arch flanked by pilasters under a cornice and a gable, and the lodge is underground, and has a doorway with a fanlight and a pediment. | II |
| Nottingham Castle middle bailey wall and towers 52.95039°N 1.15538°W | — | 1171–72 | The wall is the oldest part, with the east tower added between 1250 and 1270, and the west tower between 1460 and 1485. The wall is about 2 metres (6 ft 7 in) high and 25 metres (82 ft) long. The east tower is round and about 10 metres (33 ft) across, and the west tower has a canted base and a coped enclosing wall. | II |
| Nottingham Castle gatehouse, outer bridge and gateway 52.95066°N 1.15385°W | | 1252–55 | The gatehouse is in stone with stone slate roofs, and has a later parapet, string course and casement windows. The entrance has a pointed arch and a hood mould, and is flanked by round towers. Above the entrance is a segmental-arched panel with the city coat of arms, and inside it is a two-bay pointed barrel vault. The outer bridge, spanning the moat, has a chamfered pointed arch and a hood mould, and there is a small round arch. At the rear is a pointed arched gateway, and the gateway to the left has wrought iron double gates with square piers and finials, and smaller side gates, and adjoining it is a semicircular kiosk. | I |
| Nottingham Castle outer bailey wall and towers 52.94948°N 1.15278°W | | 1252–55 | The oldest part is the wall, with Edward's Tower added in about 1300. The wall is in stone with flat coping, and is about 8 metres (26 ft) high. Edward's Tower is a blank round tower with a plinth. The wall runs southeast from the castle gatehouse to the tower, then curves slightly to a round corner tower, then turns sharply to the southwest, and runs along the scarp of Castle Rock. | I |
| Severn's Building; 52.95049°N 1.15278°W | | c.1450 | The front range of a medieval house, moved to is present site in 1968, and used for other purposes. It is timber framed with rendered infill, on a stone plinth, with a tile roof. There are two storeys, the upper floor jettied, and three bays. On the ground floor are mullioned windows, to the right is a Tudor arched doorway, and on the upper floor the windows have two lights and wooden tracery. | II |
| 53 Castle Gate; 52.95061°N 1.15253°W | | Mid-17th century | A house, later offices, in red brick on a plinth, with floor bands, and a tile roof with coped gables. There are two storeys and attics, and three bays. The central doorway has a cornice on brackets, the windows on the lower two floors are sashes, in the attic are two through-eaves dormers with casements, and all the openings have flat brick heads and brick keystones. | II |
| Castle Museum and Art Gallery; 52.94946°N 1.15436°W | | 1674–79 | Originally a ducal palace, it was burnt down in 1831 and remodelled as a museum and art gallery by T. C. Hine in 1876–78. It is in stone with a U-shaped plan, fronts of nine and three bays, and rear wings flanking a courtyard. The east front is rusticated with a modillion cornice and a pierced balustrade. The middle five bays project slightly, they are divided by Corinthian half-columns, and the outer bays by pilasters. The central window has columns and a cornice, the four flanking windows have pediments and all have balustrades, and over the centre is an equestrian statue. The west, entrance, front has a Tuscan colonnade behind which is a triple niche and doorways at the ends. Above is a former doorway with columns and a segmental pediment. Most of the windows are two-light sashes or cross-casements, all with mullions. | I |
| Pair of gate piers northeast of Castle Museum; 52.94985°N 1.15468°W | | 1674–79 | The gate piers are in stone, square and rusticated, and are about 3 metres (9.8 ft) tall. Each pier has a cornice and an urn finial. | II |
| Pair of gate piers southwest of Castle Museum; 52.94964°N 1.15531°W | | 1674–79 | The gate piers are in stone, square and rusticated, and are about 3 metres (9.8 ft) tall. Each pier has a cornice and an urn finial. | II |
| Parapet wall south and west of Castle Museum; 52.94906°N 1.15440°W | | 1674–79 | The parapet wall is in stone on a moulded plinth, with intermediate pedestals. It runs along the cliff edge of the castle rock around the south and west sides of the castle, and is about 1 metre (3 ft 3 in) high and 140 metres (460 ft) long. | II |
| Steps leading to terrace, Castle Museum; 52.94980°N 1.15461°W | — | 1674–79 | A flight of steps about 3 metres (9.8 ft) wide with low flanking walls. On the intermediate landing are four pedestals with urns. | II |
| Terrace wall east of Castle Museum; 52.94954°N 1.15418°W | — | 1674–79 | The terrace wall, which was rebuilt in 1877–78 by T. C. Hine, is in stone with slab copings. It is about 1 metre (3 ft 3 in) high and 55 metres (180 ft), and slightly curving. The wall contains square pedestals with slab copings, two of them with figures of heraldic lions holding shields. | II |
| Brewhouse Yard Museum and caves 52.94927°N 1.15296°W | | c. 1675 | A row of four houses incorporating earlier timber framing, converted into a museum in 1975, in red brick on a plinth, with moulded brick dressings, floor bands, and a tile roof with coped gables. There are two storeys and an H-shaped plan, with a central block of eight bays with three gables, and two-bay gabled side wings. The windows are casements with flat brick arches and keystones. At the rear are caves cut into Castle Rock, consisting of irregular chambers, and with a square shaft to the surface. | II |
| Castle Rock Cottage; 52.94911°N 1.15333°W | | c. 1675 | A house, converted into part of a museum in 1977, in red brick on a plinth, with moulded brick dressings, a floor band, and a tile roof with coped gables. There are two storeys and attics, and a front of five bays with two gables. The central doorway has a fanlight, and the windows are cross-casements, those on the lower floors with keystones. | II |
| Newdigate House, railings and wall 52.95082°N 1.15221°W | | c. 1675 | The house, later used for other purposes, is stuccoed on a plinth, with stone dressings, chamfered quoins, a modillion eaves cornice, and a hipped slate roof. There are three storeys and attics, and five bays. The central doorway has a moulded surround with volutes, and a broken segmental pediment. The windows are sashes with moulded surrounds, those on the lower two floors with alternating segmental and triangular pediments. In the attic are three dormers with casement windows and alternating pediments. Along the front of the house is a crested wrought iron railing on a rendered plinth with stone coping, and a central gateway with an overthrow. To the left is a boundary wall about 10 metres (33 ft) long in brick with slab coping, containing a doorcase with an entablature. | II* |
| 49 Castle Gate; 52.95062°N 1.15235°W | | Late 17th century | A house that was refronted in about 1800, it is in painted stucco on a stone plinth, with a coped parapet and a tile roof. There are three storeys and a single bay. On the ground floor on the left is a doorway with a reeded surround, a fanlight and a cornice, and to the right is a four-light window with a single sliding light. The middle floor contains a sash window, and on the top floor is a long casement window. | II |
| 51 Castle Gate; 52.95062°N 1.15241°W | | Late 17th century | A house that was refronted in about 1800, it is in painted stucco on a stone plinth, with a moulded eaves cornice, a coped parapet, and a tile roof with a coped gable. There are two storeys and blind attics, and three bays. In the centre is a Greek Doric doorcase with oval half-columns, a pediment, and a doorway with a fanlight. The windows are sashes, and in the attic are three blind panels. | II |
| 55 Castle Gate; 52.95058°N 1.15265°W | | Late 17th century | A house, later offices, in brick on a plinth, with floor bands and a tile roof. There are two storeys and attics, and a single bay. The doorway, to the right, has a wooden doorcase and a fanlight. On each floor is a tripartite segmental-headed sash window, and in the attic is a large hipped dormer with a three-light casement window. | II |
| Ye Olde Trip to Jerusalem; 52.94936°N 1.15264°W | | Late 17th century | A public house with a timber-framed core, enclosed in brick, and incorporating carved sandstone cellars and caves, with a tile roof. There is a central range, and additions forming a Z-shaped plan. The original part has two storeys and two bays, and to the left is a taller three-storey bay forming a corner tower. | II |
| 66 St James' Street; 52.95208°N 1.15418°W | | Early 18th century | A house, later offices, in brick, the ground floor stuccoed, on a stone plinth, with stone dressings, a modillion eaves cornice and a parapet. There are four storeys and three bays. The doorway on the left has a fanlight, to its right is a two-light casement window with a mullion, and the other windows are sashes with wedge lintels and keystones. | II |
| 57 and 59 Castle Gate; 52.95055°N 1.15278°W | | Mid-18th century | A pair of houses on a corner site, later offices, they are stuccoed, on a plinth, with stone dressings, a coped parapet and a tile roof. There are two storeys and two bays. Each doorway has a cornice, and the windows are sashes. | II |
| 68 St James' Street; 52.95205°N 1.15427°W | | Mid-18th century | A house, later used for other purposes, in red brick on a painted plinth, with painted stone dressings, a ground floor impost band, a sill band, a wooden triglyph frieze, a cornice and a slate roof. There are three storeys and three bays. On the ground floor are a doorway and a passage entry, each with a round-arched head and a fanlight, and between them is a tripartite sash window with pilasters, a frieze and a cornice. The upper floors contain sash windows with flat brick arches. | II |
| 70 St James' Street; 52.95201°N 1.15437°W | | Mid-18th century | A house, later offices, in red brick on a rendered plinth, with painted stone dressings, sill bands, a modillion eaves cornice, and a tile roof with coped gables. There are four storeys and an L-shaped plan, with a front range of three bays and a three-storey rear wing. The windows on the top floor are two-light casements, and on the other floors they are sashes with flat brick heads. In the rear wing is a doorway with a cornice, a round-headed stair window, and sash windows with segmental heads. | II |
| Castle House and railings 52.95193°N 1.15464°W | | Mid-18th century | A house, later offices, in red brick on a rendered plinth, with brick dressings, floor bands and a slate roof. There are four storeys and three bays. On the left is a doorway with panelled pilasters, a fanlight, and a flat hood on brackets, and the windows are sashes. Outside, there is a wrought iron railing on a rendered plinth with stone coping. | II |
| Newstead House and railings 52.95189°N 1.15474°W | | Mid-18th century | A house, later offices, in red brick with stone dressings, a coped parapet, and a roof of tile and slate. There are three storeys and a basement, and four bays. The windows are sashes with flat brick arches. Outside the building is a wrought iron railing on a rendered plinth. The doorway is in the left return. | II |
| Sheriff House; 52.95216°N 1.15410°W | | 1767 | A house, later offices, in red brick on a rendered plinth, with painted stone dressings, floor and sill bands, a modillion eaves cornice and pediment, a parapet with balustrade panels and ball finials, and a slate roof. There are three storeys and five bays, the middle three bays projecting slightly under the pediment, and the windows are sashes under flat brick arches. In the centre bay is a full-height round-arched recessed, containing a doorcase with vermiculated jambs, an open pediment on consoles, and a round-arched door with a cast iron fanlight. Above this is a window framed with the door, a pseudo-balustrade and a cornice on brackets, and over it is a Diocletian window. To the right is a round-arched passageway with a wrought iron fanlight. In the centre at the rear is a Venetian window, over which is a Diocletian window. | II* |
| 8 and 9 St James' Terrace; 52.95204°N 1.15497°W | | c. 1775 | Three houses, later offices, in red brick on a rendered plinth, with stone dressings, modillion eaves and a tile roof. There are three storeys and attics, and five bays, the left bay recessed and angled. In the left bay is a doorway with a fanlight and a pediment on brackets, and to the right are two doorways with fanlights. The windows have wedge lintels, some are original sashes and others have been renewed. | II |
| 59A and 61 Derby Road; 52.95544°N 1.15999°W | | Late 18th century | A pair of red brick houses on a plinth, the basement painted, with stone dressings, a sill band and a slate roof. There are three storeys and a basement, and three bays. The central doorway has a round-arched head, a rebated surround and a Gothic fanlight, and is flanked by windows in round-arched recesses. The windows are sashes with flat brick arches. | II |
| 154 to 162 Derby Road; 52.95554°N 1.16349°W | | Late 18th century | Three houses later converted for other uses, in red brick with stone dressings and slate roofs. They are in three blocks, the middle block with four storeys, a basement and attics, five bays, a sill band, an eaves cornice below the attic, and sash windows. In the centre is a double doorway, and at the rear are factory additions around a yard. The left block has four storeys and two bays. On the ground floor are shop fronts, above are two canted bay windows and sashes. The right block has three storeys and three bays, on the ground floor are projecting shop fronts, and above are sash windows. The windows in both outer blocks have wedge lintels and double keystones. | II |
| 76 Hounds Gate and railings 52.95101°N 1.15336°W | | Late 18th century | A house on a corner site, later offices, in red brick on a plinth, with stucco and stone dressings, sill bands, and a hipped slate roof. There are three storeys and a basement, and two bays. The main front contains sash windows with wedge lintels and keystones, and in the basement are tripartite segmental-headed windows. In the entrance front is a round-arched doorway with steps and a fanlight, and the basement area is enclosed by wrought and cast iron railings on a chamfered stone plinth. | II |
| 3 to 9 Ilkeston Road; 52.95587°N 1.16249°W | | Late 18th century | A row of four houses, later houses and shops, in red brick, with painted stone dressings and tile roofs. There are three storeys and six bays. On the ground floor are continuous shop fronts under a cornice. The upper floors contain sash windows, those on the middle floor with wedge lintels and double keystones, and two on the top floor with mullions. | II |
| 72 St James' Street and railings 52.95198°N 1.15450°W | | Late 18th century | A house, later offices, in red brick with a painted stone basement and dressings, a sill band, a modillion eaves cornice, and a tile roof. There are four storeys and a basement, and four bays, and the windows are sashes. On the ground floor is a rusticated stuccoed arcade containing a doorway with a cast iron fanlight and three windows with stucco scallops in the tympana. The upper floor windows have panelled wedge lintels and double keystones, those on the first floor with baluster panels. In front, the basement area is enclosed by wrought iron railings on a rendered plinth. | II |
| Chartwell House; 52.95102°N 1.15262°W | | Late 18th century | Two houses, later offices, in red brick on a plinth, with stucco dressings, floor bands, a moulded eaves cornice, and a hipped slate roof. There are three storeys and seven bays. The doorway has a fanlight, the windows are sashes with flat brick arches, and at the rear is a central projection with a pediment containing a round window. | II |
| 43, 45 and 47 Castle Gate; 52.95066°N 1.15210°W | | 1788 | A row of three houses, designed by William Stretton, in red brick on a plinth, with painted stone dressings, sill bands, a dentilled eaves cornice and a tile roof. There are three storeys and nine bays. The three doorways have panelled pilasters, an entablature on brackets, and a fanlight. The windows are sashes, those on the front with flat heads, and at the rear with segmental-arched heads. | II |
| 7 St James' Terrace; 52.95191°N 1.15493°W | | c. 1790 | A house, later offices, in brick, the ground floor painted, with painted stone dressings and a slate roof. There are three storeys and fronts of one and two bays. Most of the windows are sashes with wedge lintels. Above the top floor windows are blank panels, and on the street front is a blank window. To the right is a yard wall containing a doorway. | II |
| 70 and 72 Hounds Gate; 52.95106°N 1.15296°W | | c. 1800 | A house, later offices, in red brick on a stone plinth, with painted stone dressings and a modillion eaves cornice. There are three storeys and three bays. The central doorway has an entablature on shaped brackets and a fanlight. The windows are sashes with wedge lintels and keystones. | II |
| St Mary's Vicarage and St Peter's Rectory; 52.95098°N 1.15434°W | | 1808–10 | The vicarage and rectory are in red brick with painted stone dressings and a hipped slate roof. There are three storeys and ten bays. In the third and eighth bays are full-height round-arched recesses, each containing a doorway with a fanlight, the eighth bay also with a glazed porch, and the windows are sashes. | II |
| Walls, St Mary's Vicarage and St Peter's Rectory; 52.95081°N 1.15412°W | | 1808–10 | The retaining wall is in stone, and is surmounted by a brick wall with moulded coping, it has a rounded corner on the right, and extends for about 70 metres (230 ft). The brick garden wall at the west end contains a wooden gate in a Classical stone surround. | II |
| 1 and 2 Standard Hill; 52.95125°N 1.15440°W | | 1810–12 | A pair of houses on a corner site in red brick on a rendered plinth, with painted stone dressings, modillion eaves, and a hipped slate roof with a coped gable. It is in two and three storeys with fronts of one and two bays. The round-headed doorway has a fanlight, in the left return is a round-headed doorway with a moulded surround, and the windows are sashes with wedge lintels and double keystones. | II |
| King Charles House; 52.95105°N 1.15468°W | | 1810–14 | A house on a corner site, later offices, in red brick on a rendered plinth, with stone dressings, modillion eaves, and a slate roof. There are two storeys and four bays. The round-arched doorway has a moulded surround and a fanlight. The windows are sashes with wedge lintels and double keystones. | II |
| St Mary's Parish Room and flat 52.95115°N 1.15422°W | | c. 1810–14 | The parish room and flat are in red brick with a slate roof, two storeys and five bays. To the left is a round-arched doorway with a fanlight, and to its left is a garage door. Most of the windows are cross-casements with flat brick arches, and there is a segmental-headed sash window and a smaller sash window. | II |
| St Peter's Church, Radford; 52.96027°N 1.17930°W | | 1812 | The church, built on the site of a previous church, was designed by Henry Moses Wood, and the chancel, organ chamber and vestry, designed by R. C. Sutton, were added in 1871–72. The church is built in stone with slate roofs, and consists of a nave, a chancel, an organ chamber, a vestry and a west tower. The tower has three stages, diagonal buttresses, and a west doorway with a pointed arch, above which is a traceried round window on three sides, two-light bell openings with Y-tracery, and an embattled parapet. The nave also has an embattled parapet. | II |
| 2 St James' Terrace; 52.95149°N 1.15431°W | | c. 1820 | A house, later offices, at the end of a terrace, in red brick on a plinth, with painted stone dressings, a sill band, a modillion eaves cornice, and a slate roof. There are three storeys and a front of three bays. The central doorway has a round-arched head, a fanlight and a keystone. The windows are sashes, those on the front with wedge lintels and double keystones. In the right return are round-arched windows on the left, segmental-headed windows on the right, and a doorway with a segmental-arched head. | II |
| 3 St James' Terrace; 52.95158°N 1.15442°W | | c. 1820 | A house, later offices in a terrace, in red brick on a plinth, with painted stone dressings, a sill band, a modillion eaves cornice, and a slate roof. There are three storeys and three bays. The central doorway has a round-arched head, a fanlight and a keystone. The windows are sashes with wedge lintels and double keystones. | II |
| 4 St James' Terrace; 52.95165°N 1.15451°W | | c. 1820 | A house, later offices in a terrace, in red brick on a plinth, with painted stone dressings, a sill band, a modillion eaves cornice, and a slate roof. There are three storeys and three bays. The central doorway has a round-arched head, a fanlight and a keystone, and it is flanked by tripartite windows. All the windows are sashes with wedge lintels and double keystones. | II |
| Regency House; 52.95543°N 1.16247°W | | 1820 | Two houses, later offices, they are stuccoed, with a moulded cornice and blocking course, and a slate roof. The windows are sashes with moulded surrounds. The entrance front has three storeys and six bays, the outer bays recessed. The windows on the ground floor have cornices, and on the top floor is a sill band. The outer bays contain porches with Tuscan columns and balcony railings, and the doors have fanlights. On the Ropewalk front are three storeys and a basement and five bays, two of the bays projecting under a pediment containing relief decoration and the date, and tripartite windows on the ground floor. | II |
| 119 and 121 Derby Road, wall and railings 52.95521°N 1.16349°W | — | Early 19th century | A pair of stuccoed houses with dentilled eaves and pediments, a blocking course and a slate roof. There are two storeys, basements and attics, and two bays. On each gable end is a two-storey porch with a double door and pilasters. The windows are sashes, and No. 119 has an additional lean-to porch. On the boundary wall is a wrought iron railing, and at each end is a pair of square gate piers with pyramidal caps. | II |
| 30 Park Row; 52.95269°N 1.15619°W | | Early 19th century | A house on a corner site, later an office, in red brick on a plinth, with painted stone dressings, a ground floor cornice, an eaves band, and a hipped slate roof. There are three storeys and a basement, and a front of three bays and two rounded bays on the corner. On the front is a recessed portico with two Ionic columns, and to its left is a recessed bay window with rusticated pilasters. On the corner is a three-light window with rusticated pilasters, and the other windows are sashes. | II |
| 1, 3 and 5 Regent Street; 52.95277°N 1.15634°W | | Early 19th century | A row of three houses, later offices, in red brick, the ground floor painted, on a plinth, with stone dressings, a sill band, an eaves cornice and a slate roof. There are three storeys and eight bays. On the front are three doorways with fanlights, the middle one round-headed, and the windows are sashes. | II |
| First Spiritualist National Church, wall and railings 52.95515°N 1.16379°W | | Early 19th century | A pair of stuccoed houses, later used as a church, with dentilled eaves and pediments, a blocking course, and a slate roof. There are two storeys, basements and attics, and two bays. The windows are sashes, and on each gable end is a two-storey porch and a double door with pilasters. The boundary wall at the front has a wrought iron railing, and at each end is a pair of square gate piers with pyramidal caps. | II |
| Garden Buildings and wall, Castle Museum; 52.95057°N 1.15475°W | | Early 19th century | The garden building is in stone and brick, with stone dressings and a hipped slate roof. There is a single storey and three bays, and it contains casement windows with mullions. On the right return is a porch with Ionic columns and a pediment, and a doorway with a fanlight. On each side are extensions. The rear wall of the building forms part of the boundary wall, in stone with slab coping. The wall contains a stone pier and a segmental-arched doorway. | II |
| Prince's House; 52.95257°N 1.15628°W | | Early 19th century | A house, later offices, in red brick on a rendered plinth, with painted stone dressings, a floor band, an eaves cornice and a slate roof. There are three storeys and a basement, and four bays. On the front is a Doric portico with a dentilled pediment, the windows are sashes with flat brick arches, and the basement openings have segmental heads. | II |
| Wyville House and railings 52.95107°N 1.15338°W | | Early 19th century | A house, later offices, in red brick, with stucco and stone dressings, sill bands, modillion eaves and a hipped slate roof. There are three storeys and a basement, and a single bay. In the centre is a full-height bow window containing sashes with flat brick arches, and to the right is a round-arched doorway with a fanlight. The basement area is enclosed by a cast iron railing on a chamfered stone plinth. | II |
| 1 and 2 Park Terrace and railings 52.95170°N 1.15710°W | | 1827–33 | A pair of houses designed by P. F. Robinson, they are stuccoed, on a plinth, with an eaves cornice, and a slate roof with coped gables. There are two storeys, basements and attics, and four bays. The windows are sashes with moulded surrounds, those on the ground floor with cornices, and on the upper floor with bracketed sills. In the centre is a projecting double porch with a cornice and a parapet, doorways with pilasters, and round-arched windows in the returns. The porch is flanked by two-storey canted bay windows, and on the roof are box dormers. Flanking the porch are cast iron spearhead railings and gates. | II |
| 3 and 4 Park Terrace and railings 52.95179°N 1.15733°W | | 1827–33 | A pair of houses designed by P. F. Robinson, on a plinth, with an eaves cornice, and a slate roof with coped gables. There are two storeys, basements and attics, and four bays. The windows are sashes with moulded surrounds, those on the ground floor with cornices, and on the upper floor with bracketed sills. In the centre is a projecting double porch with a cornice and a parapet, doorways with pilasters, and round-arched windows in the returns. Flanking the porch are cast iron spearhead railings and gates. | II |
| 5 and 6 Park Terrace and railings 52.95187°N 1.15757°W | | 1827–33 | A pair of houses designed by P. F. Robinson, on a plinth, with an eaves cornice, and a slate roof with coped gables. There are two storeys, basements and attics, and four bays. The windows are sashes with moulded surrounds, those on the ground floor with cornices, and on the upper floor with bracketed sills. In the centre is a projecting double porch with a cornice and a parapet, doorways with pilasters, and round-arched windows in the returns. Flanking the porch are cast iron spearhead railings and gates. | II |
| 7 and 8 Park Terrace and railings 52.95195°N 1.15778°W | — | 1827–33 | A pair of houses designed by P. F. Robinson, on a plinth, with an eaves cornice, and a slate roof with coped gables. There are two storeys, basements and attics, and four bays. The windows are sashes with moulded surrounds, those on the ground floor with cornices, and on the upper floor with bracketed sills. In the centre is a projecting double porch with a cornice and a parapet, doorways with pilasters, and round-arched windows in the returns. Flanking the porch are cast iron spearhead railings and gates. | II |
| 9 and 10 Park Terrace and railings 52.95205°N 1.15805°W | | 1827–33 | A pair of houses designed by P. F. Robinson, on a plinth, with an eaves cornice, and a slate roof with coped gables. There are two storeys, basements and attics, and four bays. The windows are sashes with moulded surrounds, those on the ground floor with cornices, and on the upper floor with bracketed sills. In the centre is a projecting double porch with a cornice and a parapet, doorways with pilasters, and round-arched windows in the returns. To its right is a two-storey round-cornered bay window. Flanking the porch are cast iron spearhead railings and gates. | II |
| 11 and 12 Park Terrace; 52.95214°N 1.15831°W | | 1827–33 | A pair of houses and a service wing, designed by P. F. Robinson, they are stuccoed, on a plinth, with an eaves band, a coped parapet, and a slate roof with coped gables. In the centre is a projecting double porch with a cornice and a parapet, and doorways with pilasters. The windows are sashes with moulded surrounds, those on the ground floor with cornices, and on the upper floor with bracketed sills, and in the returns are round-arched windows. At the rear of No. 12 the west bay is bowed, forming a tower with a flat roof. The service wing, recessed on the right, has a rusticated ground floor. | II |
| 15, 16 and 17 Park Terrace, railings and gateways 52.95388°N 1.15982°W | — | 1827–33 | A block of three houses designed by P. F. Robinson, they are stuccoed, with string courses, pilasters, modillion eaves and hipped slate roofs. There are three storeys and attics and four bays, and they are entered at first floor level. Most of the windows are sashes with moulded surrounds. The main front has a recessed centre flanked by wings with pyramidal roofs. On the first floor is a three-bay verandah on cast iron columns, and the attics contain two hipped dormers. At the rear is a pair of scroll-topped wrought iron gates and square rendered piers with pyramidal caps, a porch with corner piers, a spearhead railing and gate, and a round-arched gateway with a wrought iron gate. | II |
| 32 and 32A Ropewalk; 52.95344°N 1.15896°W | | 1827–33 | A pair of houses, later offices, they are stuccoed, the ground floor rusticated, with a sill band, an eaves cornice and blocking course, and tile roofs with coped gables. There are three storeys and a rear basement, four bays, and two rear wings. On the east front are two three-storey bow windows. Most of the windows are sashes, with bracketed cornices on the first floor, and moulded surrounds above. The rear wings have a single bay, a sill band, cornices and parapets, and in the left bay is a canted oriel window. | II |
| Tower House; 52.95180°N 1.15659°W | | 1827–33 | A house that was altered in about 1860 by T. C. Hine and in about 1800 by Watson Fothergill, it is in red brick, mainly rendered, on a stone plinth, with terracotta dressings, string courses, friezes, a cornice, a coped parapet, a timber-framed attic with brick nogging, and slate roofs. There are three storeys, a basement and attics, and three bays. In the centre is a square tower porch with a pyramidal roof and a finial. On the ground floor are two round-headed sash windows with a central shaft carrying a corbel, above which is an oriel window with a hipped roof, and over that is a window with three round-arched lights. The round-arched doorway in the left return is approached by steps, and has a fanlight. | II |
| 34 Ropewalk; 52.95333°N 1.15885°W | | 1827–37 | A house, later offices, it is stuccoed, on a plinth, with modillion eaves, a balustrade with panels of Greek key, and a tile roof. There are three storeys and a basement at the rear, and three bays. On the Park Terrace front are three two-storey bay windows, the central one canted and the others square, all with dentilled cornices. On the Ropewalk front, the left bay has a two-storey canted bay window, over which is an overhanging oriel bow window with six lights divided by chamfered mullions. The other windows are sashes. On the right is a colonnade, a gateway flanked by corniced piers with urns, and an outbuilding with a balustrade. | II |
| 36, 37 and 38 Ropewalk; 52.95314°N 1.15883°W | | 1827–37 | Houses, later offices, they are stuccoed, the ground floor is rusticated, with an eaves cornice and blocking course, and artificial slate roofs. There are three storeys and attics, and four bays. In the centre of the Park Terrace front are two bay windows. The left is rounded, with three storeys, and in the left bay is a French window and a sash window with a wrought iron balcony. The right bay window is canted, with three storeys and an attic. At the rear, most of the windows are sashes. | II |
| 40 Ropewalk; 52.95296°N 1.15881°W | | 1827–37 | A house, later offices, it is stuccoed, on a plinth, with modillion eaves, and a hipped slate roof. There are three storeys and three bays. The central doorway has a segmental pediment on brackets, to its left is a canted bay window with a cornice, and the other windows are sashes with moulded surrounds. To the right is a single-storey extension with two ranges of two bays each. In the centre at the rear is a doorway with a fanlight, a cornice and a cast iron balcony on brackets, flanked by two-storey canted bay windows. | II |
| Walton's Hotel; 52.95450°N 1.16672°W | — | 1828–32 | The house, designed by P. F. Robinson and altered by T. C. Hine and later used as a hotel, is stuccoed, on a plinth, with moulded eaves and a hipped slate roof. There are two storeys and three bays, and most of the windows are sashes. On the street front is a doorway converted into a window, flanked by bow windows. In the left return is a square porch with pilasters and an entablature, and a doorway with a fanlight. Attached to the right return is a former coach house with a single storey, an L-shaped plan, fronts of one and two bays, and a wooden cupola. | II |
| 145 and 147 Derby Road and railings 52.95481°N 1.16558°W | | c. 1830 | A pair of stuccoed houses at the end of a terrace, with a brick outer wall to the basement, the ground floor is rusticated, there is a sill band, an eaves cornice, a coped parapet and a slate roof. There are three storeys, a basement and attics, and four bays. The doorways have fanlights, on the lower floors are sash windows, those on the middle floor with cornices, on the top floor with moulded surrounds, and in the attic the windows are casements. Outside No. 147 is cast iron area railing. | II |
| Derby House; 52.95467°N 1.16630°W | — | c. 1830 | A house, later offices, at the entrance to the Park Estate, it is stuccoed, with a rusticated ground floor, a moulded eaves cornice and blocking course, and slate roofs. There are three storeys, basements and attics, and four bays, and most of the windows are sashes. In the left three bays, the windows on the middle floor have cornices and balconies, in the basement they have segmental heads and there is a doorway, and in the attic are casement windows. The right bay projects, and has a pedimented gable on the right return. | II |
| Derby Terrace and railings 52.95473°N 1.16595°W | | c. 1830 | A terrace of six stuccoed houses, later offices, the basements in concrete and blue brick, the ground floor rusticated, with a sill band, a coped parapet, and slate roofs. There are three storeys, basements and attics, and twelve bays. Most of the windows are sashes, those on the middle floor with cornices, and four with cast iron balconies on brackets. The doorways have fanlights, in the attics are box dormers, and along the front are cast iron railings. | II |
| Westbury House and wall 52.95534°N 1.16531°W | | c. 1830 | A pair of houses on a corner site, they are stuccoed, on a plinth, with ground floor quoins, a floor band, an eaves cornice, and a coped parapet. There are two storeys and attics and an L-shaped plan, with fronts of three and six bays, and a rear wing. Most of the windows are sashes with moulded architraves, and some have balustraded balconies. The street front has a projecting centre containing a canted bay window with Ionic columns and a pierced balustrade, and above is a pedimented dormer. In each return is a round-arched doorway with Ionic columns and an entablature. Outside the left return is a stone boundary wall with slab coping and square piers. | II |
| Former North Lodge to Park Estate; 52.95467°N 1.16665°W | | c. 1832–34 | The lodge, later used for other purposes, was designed by T. C. Hine, is in stone on a plinth, with a moulded string course and a coped parapet with terracotta roundels. There is a single storey and three bays, the left bay octagonal and projecting. On the front is a round-arched window and a doorway. | II |
| 15 Park Valley and wall 52.95158°N 1.15864°W | | 1838–39 | A house designed by P. F. Robinson, it is stuccoed, the rear basement is rusticated, and it has a floor band, an eaves cornice, a coped parapet and a slate roof. There are three storeys and a rear basement and two bays, and the windows are sashes. At the rear is a central two-storey stair turret with a cornice, and below is a gabled porch containing a round-arched doorway with a fanlight. The boundary wall is stuccoed, with stone coping, to the left is a square end pier, and to the right is a coped projection, a door and another pier. | II |
| 23 and 25 Park Valley, balustrades and gate piers 52.95176°N 1.15919°W | | c. 1838–39 | A pair of houses designed by P. F. Robinson, with additions in 1848–50 by T. C. Hine. They are stuccoed, with a rusticated basement, floor bands, an eaves cornice and blocking course, and slate roofs with coped gables. There are two storeys and a basement, and four bays. Most of the windows are sashes, some with moulded surrounds. On the garden front are giant Doric pilasters. The street front has a projecting centre with two coped gables, two doorways with fluted pilasters and fanlights. Outside, flanking the porch, are two 3 metres (9.8 ft) lengths of coped balustrade, and at the ends are square gate piers with pyramidal caps. | II |
| Nottingham Cathedral and wall 52.95467°N 1.15711°W | | 1841–44 | A Roman Catholic church designed by Augustus Pugin, and elevated to a cathedral in 1851. It is in stone with slate roofs, and has a cruciform plan, consisting of a nave with a clerestory, north and south aisles, three porches, north and south transepts, a choir with an eastern and side chapels, and a steeple at the crossing. The steeple has a square tower with two stages, a recessed bell stage with pointed-arched openings and moulded surrounds, and an octagonal broach spire with diagonal buttresses containing niches, and lucarnes. At the east end of the choir is a round window. Attached is a stone boundary wall with gabled coping. | II* |
| Presbytery, Nottingham Cathedral; 52.95441°N 1.15731°W | | 1841–44 | The presbytery, designed by Augustus Pugin, is in red brick with stone dressings, and slate roofs with coped gables. There are two storeys and attics, and a square plan with fronts of three bays, and a central light well. Most of the windows are casements with mullions and transoms. On the entrance front is a pointed-arched doorway with a hood mould, a stair window, an external chimney stack, and a gabled dormer. On the south front is a shouldered external chimney stack, and a gabled wing containing a two-storey canted bay window with a hipped roof. At the northeast corner is a lean-to porch with a pointed-arched doorway and window, linked to a corridor connecting with the cathedral. | II |
| 17 Regent Street and railings 52.95296°N 1.15702°W | | 1844 | A house, later offices, in red brick with a rendered basement, with dressings in stone and brick, dentilled bands, and a tile roof with coped gables. There are three storeys and a basement and three bays, the middle bay with a shaped gable, the outer gables shouldered with finials, and in the right gable is a datestone. The windows are casements with mullions. The central doorway has a flat hood on brackets, and to the left is another doorway, both with fanlights. Outside, are cast iron area railings on a brick plinth. | II |
| Hine House; 52.953122°N 1.15754°W | | 1844–48 | A house and office on a sloping corner site designed by T. C. Hine for his own use, later offices, it is in red brick, the basement in stone, with blue brick diapering, stone dressings and patterned tile roofs. There are two storeys, a basement and attics, and fronts of three bays. To the left is a large coped gabled bay containing a two-storey bay window rising from the basement. In the angle to the right is a square tower porch with a pyramidal roof. At its base is a flight of steps with a balustrade leading up to a doorway with a four-centred arched head, a moulded surround and shafts, and under the steps is a Tudor arched doorway. On the right side is a drawing office with a single storey and a basement, containing a shouldered doorway and buttresses, and to the right is a bay window. | II |
| 8 and 10 Park Valley; 52.95122°N 1.15693°W | | 1844–51 | A pair of houses, designed by P. F. Robinson, in stone, the ground floor partly rendered, with quoins and tile roofs. There are three storeys, fronts of three bays, and an irregular plan. Most of the windows are casements with chamfered surrounds. On the west front are two gables and a two-storey gabled porch, all the gables with elaborate traceried bargeboards. The doorways have Tudor arched heads. On the north side is a three-light mullioned window, above which is a coved jetty with some timber framing. Elsewhere, there are bay windows, some square, and others canted, one with a pyramidal roof. | II |
| Park Tunnel; 52.95425°N 1.15974°W | | 1844–55 | The tunnel, completed by T. C. Hine, carried a carriage drive, later a footpath. It is a round-arched, unlined, rock-cut tunnel, about 125 metres (410 ft) long. In the centre is a light shaft with rounded ends, and parapet walls with chamfered coping. At the north end is a stone stairway with stone piers and iron handrails leading to a gateway. | II |
| Convent of Our Lady of Mercy; 52.95470°N 1.15835°W | | 1845–47 | The convent was designed by Augustus Pugin and later extended to his plans, and subsequently converted into flats. It is in red brick on a plinth, with stone dressings, a floor band, and slate roofs with coped gables. The building is in two and three storeys and attics, with four ranges of nine and six bays around a quadrangle containing a five-arched cloister. The east front contains cross-casement windows, elsewhere most windows are casements with mullions, and in the attics are gabled dormers. The convent incorporates a chapel with pointed-arched windows, at the southeast corner is a three-storey square stair tower, and behind it is a square bell turret, both with a pyramidal roof. The south front, facing the road, is blind. | II |
| 4 and 5 Western Terrace, railings and wall 52.95442°N 1.16576°W | | 1845–50 | A pair of houses, later flats, designed by T. C. Hine, they are stuccoed, each with a rusticated basement and ground floor, a sill band, an eaves cornice and blocking course, and a slate roof. There are three storeys and a basement at the front, four bays and recessed side bays, and most of the windows are sashes. The bays of the upper floors of the garden front are divided by giant Ionic pilasters. In the right bay, and in the right return are round-cornered casement windows, and in the right return is a doorway with a fanlight. Outside, there is a cast iron area railing to the left, and to the right is a coped and rendered area wall. | II |
| 5 and 6 Western Terrace and wall 52.95428°N 1.16606°W | | 1845–50 | A pair of houses on a corner site, later flats, designed by T. C. Hine, they are stuccoed, with a rusticated basement, a sill band, an eaves cornice, a balustrade with pedestals, and a slate roof. There are two storeys and a two-storey basement at the front, and five bays. The left bay on the main front has a three-storey canted bay window, and to the right the bays are divided by giant Ionic pilasters. Most of the windows are sashes with moulded surrounds. The boundary wall is in red brick with a blue brick plinth and coping, and near the houses is a gateway with square piers and a coped flat gable. | II |
| 7 to 10 Western Terrace; 52.95418°N 1.16665°W | | c. 1845–50 | Four houses in linked pairs, designed by T. C. Hine, they are stuccoed, each with a rusticated basement, a sill band, an eaves cornice, and roofs of tile and slate with coped gables. Most of the windows are sashes. There are two storeys, basements and attics, and each house has four bays. The right house has a projecting centre under a pediment flanked by a balustrade on the left and a parapet on the right. On the upper floors are giant pilasters, and the ground floor windows have pediments. The central link has three storeys and two bays. | II |
| 7 Park Valley and wall 52.95124°N 1.15771°W | | c. 1848–51 | A stuccoed house on a plinth, with a first floor cornice, a bracketed eaves cornice, pedimented gables, and a hipped slate roof. There are two storeys, an L-shaped plan, with a main range of four bays and a rear wing. The windows are sashes, those on the front with moulded surrounds, and the doorway has a fanlight. The boundary wall is stuccoed with stone slab coping, and contains a pair of chamfered stone gate piers at the ends, the left one with an overthrow. Between them are two doorways, one round-arched under a gable. | II |
| 3 South Road; 52.94951°N 1.16349°W | | c. 1850 | A house designed by Watson Fothergill and remodelled by him between 1875 and 1881. It is in red brick on a plinth, with dressings in blue brick and stone, a floor band, timber framing with brick nogging in the upper parts, and slate roofs. It is in two and three storeys with attics, and has a T-shaped plan, with fronts of three and six bays. On the right of the street front is a square three-storey tower with a pyramidal rood and raking dormers. It contains a two-storey canted bay window with a balustrade, and the bay to its left has a jettied gable. On the right return is a round stair turret with stepped windows and a conical roof. Elsewhere, there are more canted bay windows, and a canted oriel window under an embattled crest. | II |
| Regency House Hotel, basements and railings 52.95514°N 1.16612°W | | c. 1850 | A terrace of five houses later used for other purposes, they are stuccoed, with rock-faced stone basements, on a plinth, with a floor band, a moulded eaves cornice and blocking course, and hipped slate roofs. There are three storeys and a basement, and eight bays, the outer bays slightly projecting, and the windows are sashes. On the ground floor are three round-headed doorways with Ionic columns and sham balconies, and canted bay windows with cornices. The windows on the middle floor have segmental pediments on brackets, and on the top floor they have moulded surrounds. The basement retaining wall has an incomplete wrought iron railing, a door and windows, all with round heads, a gateway, and steps flanked by square piers. | II |
| Waterworks Pumping Station; 52.95531°N 1.16125°W | | 1850 | The pumping station, later used for other purposes, is in red brick on a chamfered plinth, with stone dressings, buttresses, a modillion cornice, a coped parapet, and a tile roof. There are two storeys and fronts of one and three bays. Most of the openings have pointed-arched heads and stone surrounds, the windows are lancets, and the doorway has a pointed segmental head. At the northwest corner is a square two-stage tower with diapering, a modillion string course, and a moulded parapet. | II |
| Railings and wall, Wellington Circus; 52.95406°N 1.15752°W | | 1850 | The circular garden in the centre of Wellington Crescent is enclosed by a cast iron spearhead railing on a brick plinth with cast iron coping, and it has a diameter of about 50 metres (160 ft). There are two matching gates opposite the converging roads. | II |
| 19 Regent Street and railings 52.95301°N 1.15721°W | | Mid-19th century | A house, later offices, in red brick on a plinth, with stone dressings, quoins, and an eaves cornice. There are three storeys and a basement, and three bays, the middle bay projecting slightly. The central doorway has a moulded surround and a fanlight. The windows are sashes, those on the middle floor with triangular pediments on brackets and balustraded balconies, the middle balcony on consoles. At the front are cast iron area spearhead railings on stone plinths. | II |
| 21 and 23 Regent Street and railings 52.95305°N 1.15737°W | — | Mid-19th century | A pair of houses, later offices, in red brick with a rendered basement, dressings in stone and stucco, a sill band, a modillion eaves cornice and a slate roof. There are three storeys, a basement and attics, and four bays. In the centre is a double porch with pilasters and an entablature, and doorways with moulded surrounds and fanlights. The windows are sashes with moulded architraves and bracketed sills, and in the attic are pedimented dormers. Outside is a cast iron railing on a rendered plinth. | II |
| Garden Summerhouse; 52.95336°N 1.16022°W | — | Mid-19th century | The summerhouse in the garden of No. 14A Park Terrace is in rendered brick on a plinth, with corner pilasters and a pyramidal pantile roof with a finial. There is a single storey and a basement, and a single bay. It has panelled sides, rebated round-arched windows with keystones and a plain doorway. | II |
| Railings and gates, Newcastle Terrace; 52.95426°N 1.15992°W | | Mid-19th century | The railings are in cast iron on a brick plinth with chamfered stone coping, and enclose a rectangular garden about 10 metres (33 ft) wide by 40 metres (130 ft) long. At the east and west ends are wrought iron gates. | II |
| 7–15 Regent Street; 52.95286°N 1.15672°W | | 1850–54 | A terrace of five houses, later offices, designed by T. C. Hine, in red brick with painted basements, painted stone dressings, a sill band, and slate roofs with Flemish gables and ball finials. There are three storeys, basements and attics, and ten bays. The doorways have moulded surrounds, cornices and trefoil-headed openings. Most of the windows are sashes with bracketed sills and cornices. Steps lead up to the doorways, and the entrances are flanked by panelled square stone piers with ball finials and cast iron railings. | II |
| 2–12 Regent Street; 52.95299°N 1.15623°W | | 1854–56 | A row of six houses at the end of a terrace, later offices, designed by T. C. Hine, in red brick on a rendered basement and plinth, with stone dressings, quoins, a sill band, and slate roofs with elaborate Flemish gables and finials. There are three storeys, basements and attics, and twelve bays. The windows are sashes with moulded surrounds, bracketed sills, and strapwork-enhanced lintels. The doorways are paired, with pilasters, strapwork enrichment and debased entablatures. In the right gable end are round-headed windows. | II |
| 14–24 Regent Street; 52.95314°N 1.15676°W | | 1854–56 | A row of six terraced houses, later offices, designed by T. C. Hine, in red brick on a plinth, with painted stone dressings, a string course, an eaves cornice, a coped blocking course, and slate roofs. There are three storeys and attics, and twelve bays. The windows are sashes with stone surrounds. In each right bay is a round-arched doorway with a moulded surround, and a single-light window in each upper floor. In the left bay of most houses is a two-storey square bay window with three-light windows, above which a dummy balcony, a single-light window, and a Flemish gabled dormer with stone verges and three finials; the bay window in the right house is canted. | II |
| 3 to 9 College Street, steps and railings 52.95410°N 1.15804°W | | c. 1855 | A terrace of four houses, later offices, in red brick with stone basements, stone dressings, quoins, a sill band, an enriched modillion cornice and hipped slate roofs. There are three storeys and a basement, and eight bays. Most of the windows are sashes, those on the middle floor with moulded surrounds, and the basement windows have segmental heads and keystones. On the ground floor, the alternating doorways and windows have moulded surrounds and cornices. Stone steps with brick piers and cast iron balustrade railings lead up to most of the doorways, and the area railings are on brick plinths with stone copings. | II |
| 1 and 2 Castle Grove; 52.95010°N 1.15622°W | | 1856 | A pair of houses designed by T. C. Hine, in white brick on a plinth, with dressings in red and blue brick, a sill band, a moulded cornice, and a hipped slate roof. There are two storeys and attics, and fronts of three and four bays. Most of the windows are sashes with chamfered surrounds. In the centre is a round-arched doorway with sidelights, a cornice and a segmental pediment. At the right corner is an octagonal turret with a spire roof. In the right bay is a canted bay window, over which is a triple-arched loggia with round arches and columns with ornate capitals. | II |
| Walls, railings and gates, 1 and 2 Castle Grove; 52.95007°N 1.15649°W | | 1856 | The structures were designed by T. C. Hine. The retaining wall is in stone with cast iron stanchions and a wrought iron railing and gates. At the Lenton Road end there are steps with a gate and lamp to No. 1, and at the other end is a concave recess with a gate and a railing to No. 2. | II |
| Lamp standard, 2 Castle Grove; 52.94997°N 1.15615°W | — | c. 1856 | The lamp standard to the southwest of the house is in cast iron, and is about 3 metres (9.8 ft) tall. It has a twisted stem, and is surmounted by an octagonal lantern. | II |
| 3 Castle Grove; 52.94951°N 1.15564°W | — | 1856 | The house designed by T. C. Hine is in white brick on a plinth, with dressings in red and blue brick, stucco and stone, a floor band, rebated eaves, and slate roofs. There are two storeys and three bays. In the centre is a doorway with a pointed-arched head, a moulded surround and shafts. To the left is a two-storey canted bay window with a pyramidal roof, and to the right is a two-storey square bay window with a hipped roof. On the corner is an octagonal three-stage tower, and in the right return is an iron lean-to conservatory. | II |
| 5 Castle Grove; 52.94978°N 1.15636°W | — | 1856 | The house designed by T. C. Hine is in white brick, with dressings in stucco and stone, a sill band, a string course, a coped parapet with ball finials, and hipped slate roofs with a tile crest. There are three storeys and attics and two bays, and the house is entered on the first floor. Most of the windows are sashes with moulded surrounds. On the front is a three-storey canted bay window with a coped balustrade and a coped gable with a round window. At the rear is a round-arched doorway with a round gable, and there is a large glazed conservatory. | II |
| 7 Castle Grove and archway 52.95023°N 1.15665°W | | 1856 | A lodge, later a private house, designed by T. C. Hine in white brick on a stone and brick plinth, with dressings in red and blue brick, stucco and stone, a chamfered eaves cornice and a slate roof. There are two storeys and attics and two bays. On the corner is an octagonal turret with a truncated octagonal spire, mullioned windows with cusped head on the ground floor, sash windows on the upper floor, and through-eaves dormers above, each with a segmental pediment and a finial. To the right is a through-eaves two-storey bay window. On the left is a segmental carriage arch with a double-chamfered surround, and a stepped gable with moulded coping and a ball finial. | II |
| 18, 19 and 20 Park Terrace, railings and retaining wall to Park Tunnel; 52.95403°N 1.15983°W | | 1856 | The tunnel is the older part, with the house built in 1881, both designed by T. C. Hine. The house is in red brick on a plinth, with floor bands, an eaves cornice, a coped parapet and hipped slate roofs. There are two storeys, a basement and attics, and four bays, and most of the windows are sashes, some with pediments. To the left is a corner tower with a conical spire roof, and other features include bay windows, an oriel window, roundels, and balustrades. The porch has a pediment and a round-arched doorway. Outside, the central gateway is flanked by terracotta balustrades, there are spearhead railings, and a semicircular retaining wall to the tunnel with chamfered coping. The lower storeys of the house are integral with the retaining wall. | II |
| Barbican House and Bearcroft; 52.94954°N 1.15608°W | — | 1856 | The house, designed by T. C. Hine and later divided into two, is in white brick, partly painted, with stucco dressings, a sill band, a moulded cornice, a coped parapet with ball finials, and hipped slate roofs. There are three storeys and attics, and fronts of two bays, and both houses are entered on the first floor. Most of the windows are sashes. The southwest front has two projecting gabled bays with a round-arched window in each gable. In the right return is a three-storey canted bay window with a turret and a spire roof containing three small gabled dormers. The doorway has a round arch under a moulded round gable with a ball finial. | II |
| Castle Rising and railings 52.95016°N 1.15688°W | | 1856 | A pair of houses, later three, designed by T. C. Hine, in red brick, the basement rendered, with stucco dressings, a moulded eaves cornice with a tile frieze, and a slate roof. There are two storeys, basements and attics, and four bays, the inner bays recessed and flanked by gabled wings. Most of the windows are sashes with moulded surrounds. The attic windows have round-arched heads, those in the middle bay in through-eaves dormers with hipped roofs. The outer bays have basement projections carrying canted bay windows with hipped roofs, and in the basements are three-light mullioned windows. On the right is a gabled glazed enclosure to an external stair. Enclosing the basement areas in the middle bays are spearhead railings. | II |
| Daniel's Cave and Haddon Hall Stairs; 52.95314°N 1.15948°W | — | c. 1856 | Two man-made ornamental caves. Daniel's Cave is about 3 metres (9.8 ft) high, open at the west end, and containing a central carved and ribbed dome with a skylight on four columns. At the inner end is a sculpture group in bed rock illustrating Daniel in the lions' den. On the north side is a passage leading to a rock-cut staircase, about 9 metres (30 ft) long, a copy of a staircase at Haddon Hall, with columns, balustrades and niches with figures. | II |
| 1 South Road and wall 52.94906°N 1.16293°W | — | Late 1850s | The house, designed by T. C. Hine, is in red brick on a plinth with dressings in yellow brick and stone, panelled floor and eaves bands, a coved eaves cornice, and hipped slate roofs. It is in two and three storeys, and has a square plan, with fronts of three bays, and most of the windows are sashes. On the front is a central square three-storey tower porch with a pyramidal roof. It contains a doorway with a moulded surround and a fanlight, above which is a round-arched window and round-arched corner balconies with shafts. To the right is a flat-headed doorway, and on the right return is a lean-to porch. The boundary wall is in Bulwell stone with red and blue brick bands, stone panels and stepped blue brick coping. Opposite the main entrance is a gateway with square piers with plinths and cornices, a wooden gate, and a wrought iron overthrow. | II |
| 28 and 28A Regent Street and railings 52.95328°N 1.15722°W | | 1858 | Three houses, later offices, on a corner site, designed by T. C. Hine, in red brick on a plinth, with dressings in yellow brick and stone, quoins, a tile frieze, an eaves cornice, and a diaper-work parapet. There are three storeys and a partial basement, and fronts of three bays. Most of the windows are sashes in moulded, eared and shouldered surrounds. The doorway on Regent Street has a segmental head, an eared surround and a cast iron fanlight, and to the left is a smaller doorway with a plain surround. The Oxford Street doorway has a round-arched head, a moulded surround, a fanlight, and a segmental pediment. On the ground floor are six bay windows, two square and four canted, with decorated parapets. In front of the Regent Street entrance is a fence with cast iron posts linked by chains. | II |
| Cherwell House; 52.95321°N 1.15789°W | | c. 1859 | A house on a corner site, later offices, designed by T. C. Hine, in red brick on a plinth, with stone dressings, moulded eaves, and a slate roof. There are two storeys, a basement and attics, and three bays. The central doorway has a traceried pointed arch and a hood mould, and steps lead up to a recessed door with sidelights. Above is a two-light shouldered window and a gabled dormer. In the left bay is a canted bay window with a traceried balustrade, and above is a three-light window, and a gabled dormer. The right bay contains a bay window with a basement and two storeys, the upper part canted. In the basement, on the left is a small segmental-headed window, and to the right a four-light mullioned window. There are two gables on the right return, and at the rear where there are also two mullioned stair windows. | II |
| East Lodge; 52.95172°N 1.15669°W | | c. 1860 | The lodge, later an office, is in stone with quoins, a tile roof with coped gables and kneelers, and a tall chimney with two coped octagonal flues. There is a single storey and a single bay. In the gabled end facing the street is a cross-casement window with a moulded surround and a chamfered mullion, and above is a decorative plaque. To the left is a gabled porch with a patterned tile roof and a Tudor arched doorway. | II |
| 26 Regent Street and railings 52.95322°N 1.15707°W | | c. 1865 | The house is in red brick on a plinth, with dressings in blue brick, terracotta and painted stone, a patterned terracotta floor band, an eaves band, a cornice on brackets, and a slate roof with patterned ridge tiles. There are three storeys and a basement, and three bays, and the windows are sashes. To the left is a two-storey canted bay window, the ground floor windows with pointed arches, those on the upper floor shouldered, and both with a central shaft and a foliage capital. To the right is a doorway with a plain surround, above it is a shouldered window, and on the top floor are windows with pointed arches and hood moulds. In front is a cast iron area railing on a chamfered stone plinth. | II |
| Boundary marker northeast of Castle Gatehouse; 52.95094°N 1.15371°W | | 1869 | The boundary marker is against a wall overlooking a road junction. It is in cast iron, and consists of a half-round post with a domed top, about 1 metre (3 ft 3 in) tall. The marker is inscribed with the date and the names of the overseers of the poor. | II |
| Boundary marker at southeast corner of the bailey wall 52.94951°N 1.15237°W | | 1869 | The boundary marker is against a wall overlooking a paved area. It is in cast iron, and consists of a half-round post with a domed top, about 1 metre (3 ft 3 in) tall. The marker is inscribed with the date and the names of the overseers of the poor. | II |
| Boundary marker outside 2A Ropewalk; 52.95548°N 1.16217°W | — | 1869 | The boundary marker is against a wall by the corner of a building. It is in cast iron, and consists of a half-round post with a domed top, about 1 metre (3 ft 3 in) tall. The marker is inscribed with the date, the name of the parish, and the names of the overseers of the poor. | II |
| Boundary marker behind 8 Pelham Crescent; 52.95402°N 1.16775°W | | 1869 | The boundary marker is against a wall on Barrack Lane. It is in cast iron, and consists of a half-round post with a domed top, about 1 metre (3 ft 3 in) tall. The marker is inscribed with the date and the names of the overseers of the poor. | II |
| Boundary marker behind 12 Pelham Crescent; 52.95363°N 1.16796°W | | 1869 | The boundary marker is against a wall on Barrack Lane. It is in cast iron, and consists of a half-round post with a domed top, about 1 metre (3 ft 3 in) tall. The marker is inscribed with the date and the names of the overseers of the poor. | II |
| Pair of boundary marklers opposite 5 St James' Terrace; 52.95161°N 1.15478°W | | 1869 | The boundary markers against a wall and are dated 1869 on the right and 1878 on the left. They are in cast iron, and each consists of a half-round post with a domed top. The right marker has the names of the overseers of the poor, and the left marker has the names of the city officials. | II |
| Columns Cave; 52.95362°N 1.15948°W | — | c. 1870 | A man-made ornamental cave under Park Terrace, open at the west end. It contains three rows of six square columns with relief panels and capitals. The walls have half-columns, between which are bas-relief figures and crucifixes. | II |
| Herbarium cave 52.95331°N 1.16005°W | — | c. 1870 | A pair of man-made ornamental rectangular caves at two levels. Each cave has rock-cut ledges on three sides. | II |
| Steps cave 52.95321°N 1.15957°W | — | c. 1870 | A man-made ornamental cave cut in a natural rock face. It has a doorway and an opening to the left, both round-arched, and on the right are rows of niches. The doorway leads to a round-arched tunnel and a brick staircase leading to an upper terrace. | II |
| Churchyard wall and gateways, St Peter's Church, Radford; 52.96001°N 1.17933°W | | c. 1871 | The churchyard wall is in stone, mainly with chamfered coping, and it encloses a rectangular churchyard about 200 metres (660 ft) by 100 metres (330 ft). At the southeast corner is a gateway with a pointed arch, a stepped gable and a finial, dated 1953, and there is a similar smaller gateway on Churchfield Lane, dated 1962. | II |
| Summerhouse Cave; 52.95297°N 1.15966°W | — | 1872 | A man-made ornamental rectangular cave measuring about 6 metres (20 ft) by 2 metres (6 ft 7 in) with a central opening on the west side. The walls have relief carvings, half-columns, and wall recesses ornamented with tufa. In the centre is a font. | II |
| Castle Bank and wall 52.95011°N 1.15722°W | | 1873 | A house divided into two, designed by Watson Fothergill, in red brick on a plinth, with dressings in stone and blue brick, floor bands, a traceried eaves band, and a slate roof with green and grey bands and coped gables. There are three storeys and three bays. On the left is a massive canted bay window with a pyramidal roof and a finial. In the centre is a doorway that has a fanlight with two trefoils, over which is a round-headed cross-casement window with a quatrefoil above. On the left return is a timber-framed gabled porch set at an angle with a segmental-headed doorway, above which is a gabled through-eaves dormer with a traceried round window. Most of the windows are sashes. In the right corner is an angled three-light window with shafts, under an ogee corbel with a datestone. On the left return is a brick boundary wall with a balustrade and moulded brick coping. | II |
| Fothergill House and wall 52.95007°N 1.15747°W | | 1873 | The house, designed by Watson Fothergill, is in red brick on a plinth, with dressings in stone and blue brick, polychrome bands, a corbel table, moulded eaves, and banded slate roofs. It is in two and three storeys with two bays, and most of the windows are sashes with stone lintels. In the centre is a doorway with shafts and sidelights with trefoil heads, and above in the attic is a gabled dormer. To the right is a massive three-storey bay window with pointed-arched recess containing a datestone, and a pyramidal roof. The boundary wall is in brick with stepped coping in stone and moulded brick, containing a gateway with square brick piers flanked by short lengths with balustrades. | II |
| Peveril Tower and gateway 52.95219°N 1.16718°W | | c. 1875 | The house, designed by T. C. Hine, is in painted roughcast brick on a blue brick plinth, with an impost band, a moulded sill band and floor band, a coved cornice, and hipped slate roofs. There are two storeys and attics, and fronts of three bays, and most of the windows are sashes. On the entrance front is a projecting three-bay porch, and a round-arched doorway with Ionic pilasters, a fanlight and an entablature. On the garden front is a three-storey canted bay window with rises to form an octagonal cupola with a sham balcony and round-headed openings flanked by Ionic pilasters. On the south front is a conservatory. The gateway is flanked by square columns, each on a chamfered plinth, with cornice caps and ball finials, containing wrought iron gates, with a short length of coped wall on each side. | II |
| Gateway and wall, Park House; 52.95326°N 1.16431°W | — | Late 19th century | The boundary wall is in red brick on a plinth, it is panelled, and has gabled coping, and it extends for about 15 metres (49 ft). On the left are two square brick piers with corner shafts, plinths, cornices and flat stone caps. | II |
| Wall and gateways, 3 South Road; 52.94921°N 1.16315°W | | c. 1875–81 | The wall is in red brick, partly painted, with a rock-faced stone plinth and moulded brick coping. It encloses the garden on three sides, and contains two gateways with square brick piers. | II |
| Mevell House and stable block 52.95102°N 1.16346°W | — | 1877 | The house, later divided into flats, was designed by T. C. Hine. It is in red brick with a stone basement, on a plinth, with stone dressings, a floor band, coved eaves and slate roofs. There are two storeys, a basement and attics, and fronts of three bays. Most of the windows are sashes with moulded surrounds. The middle bay of the street front projects under a shaped gable with a finial, and contains a decorative round-arched doorway with columns, and inner doors with a fanlight. The outer bays contain French windows with moulded surrounds and hood moulds, and in the attics are box dormers. In the left return is a mullioned and transomed stair window, and in the right return is a canted bay window. The attached stable block has a single storey and five bays, and contains round-arched openings. | II |
| Gateway and wall, Mevell House (east); 52.95110°N 1.16311°W | — | 1877 | The boundary wall and gateway were designed by T. C. Hine. The wall enclosing the stable court is in red brick on a rock-faced stone plinth, and has stone coping. The entrance has square piers with cornice caps, and is flanked by walls with a corbel table and chamfered brick coping. | II |
| Gateway, railing and wall, Mevell House (west); 52.95082°N 1.16365°W | — | 1877 | The boundary wall, railing and gateway were designed by T. C. Hine. The boundary wall is in red brick on a plinth, with blue brick dressings, a corbel table and chamfered coping. There are five panelled square stone gate piers with cornice caps, two double gates and a smaller single gate. To the left is a length of wall with wrought iron railing and a square end pier. | II |
| 25 Park Valley and walls 52.95185°N 1.15946°W | | 1878 | The house on a corner site, designed by T. C. Hine, is in red brick on a plinth, with dressings in terracotta and stone, floor bands, moulded brick eaves, and slate roofs. There are two storeys, a basement and attics, and three bays. Most of the windows are sashes, those on the ground floor with pointed arches. The middle bay of the garden front is recessed, and in the attic are two box dormers. The left corner is splayed and corbelled and contains a single-light window. On the right of the entrance front is a three-stage tower porch with an arcaded top stage and a pyramidal roof. To its left is a two-storey canted bay window with a pyramidal roof. In front of the porch are coped balustrades with two gate piers, and to the right is a rendered brick wall with gabled coping. To the left is a former coach house with two storeys, elaborate traceried timber framing and pargeted panels, containing an oriel window. | II |
| Colston House; 52.95460°N 1.15628°W | | 1878 | A group of three houses and shops on a corner site, designed by R. C. Sutton, in red brick on a plinth, with terracotta dressings, a modillion eaves cornice, and a hipped slate roof. There are three storeys and fronts of three bays. On the corner is an original wooden shop front with pilasters and a dentilled fascia cornice, flanked by plate glass windows with moulded arched heads. Angled on the corner is a doorway with a swan-neck pediment and a cartouche. The middle bay on Derby Road contains a shop front over which is an oriel window with a parapet, and on North Circus Street is a doorway with sidelights and pediment. The windows on the upper floors have aprons, on the middle floor are paired sash windows, and the windows on the top floor have segmental heads. | II |
| War Memorial Obelisk and Kerb, northeast of the Castle Museum; 52.95045°N 1.15469°W | | c. 1880 | The war memorial commemorates those lost in the Second Anglo-Afghan War. It is in grey granite and consists of a tapering obelisk on a square base and an inscribed pedestal. The obelisk is surrounded by a kerb with miniature obelisks linked by chains. | II |
| Clyde Works; 52.96023°N 1.17140°W | — | 1881 | A former lace factory in red brick on a chamfered blue brick plinth, with stone dressings, a moulded eaves cornice, and slate roofs. There are five storeys and a basement, and ranges of 22 and eleven bays. The carriage arch has a moulded round arch, moulded impost blocks, and a keystone. The windows have segmental heads, there are tall taking-in doors on all floors, and in the internal courtyards are caned stair projections. | II |
| Greek Orthodox Church of the Virgin Mary Eleousa; 52.95544°N 1.16506°W | | 1882–83 | Originally a Congregational church, it is in red brick with stone dressings and slate roofs, and consists of a nave with a clerestory, and aisles. The entrance front is gabled, and it contains a lancet window. The porch projects and contains double doors in a pointed-arched recess with shafts under a traceried gable, and above it are two two-light windows with pointed arches and shafts. To the left is a panelled square turret with a gabled roof, and to the right is a taller square turret with a traceried panelled bell stage, a cross gable roof with a finial. | II |
| Boulevard Works; 52.96003°N 1.17685°W | | 1883 | A former lace factory in two ranges, the later range added in 1896, and later converted into flats. It is in red brick with dressings in stone, moulded brick and blue brick, and slate roofs. There are five storeys, a basement and attics, and fronts of 39 and three bays. It has polychrome bands and moulded modillion eaves, and on the rounded corner entrance bay is a shaped gable containing a clock. The doorway has a segmental-arched head, a fanlight and a keystone. The windows are casements with segmental heads, and there is a staircase tower with a shaped gable. The later range has two storeys and a basement and 33 bays, and windows with flat heads. The doorway has a round-arched head, columns, and a round hood on brackets, and above it is a window flanked by pilasters under a shaped gable with a datestone. | II |
| Mortimer House and the Old Castle Inn; 52.95079°N 1.15320°W | | 1883 | A row of buildings designed by Watson Fothergill, including shops, offices and a public house. They are in red brick with dressings in blue brick and stone, and tile roofs. There are two and three storeys, and fronts of 15 and five bays. On the right is a rounded corner, behind which is a round turret with a hipped dormer and a conical roof. At the left end is a public house with an angled corner bay and a timber-framed oriel window, and to the right is a square four-stage tower with a hipped roof and a weather vane. Between, most of the windows are cross-casements with segmental heads, and there are shop fronts, one with a cross-mullioned window and cast iron columns. | II |
| Douglas Primary School; 52.95595°N 1.16836°W | | c. 1885 | The school, designed by A. H. Goodall, is in red brick, with a basement in Bulwell stone, on a plinth, with terracotta dressings, moulded sill bands, and hipped tile roofs with shaped coped gables and pediments. There are two storeys and a basement, a main range with eight bays, the centre recessed, two projecting bays at the ends, and a single-storey rear wing. Most of the windows are sashes with segmental- or round-arched heads. On the front are two gabled dormers, and on the rear wing is a through-eaves dormer. | II |
| Walton House, wall and lych gate 52.95401°N 1.16548°W | | 1886 | The house, designed by Watson Fothergill, is in red brick with a stone basement, dressings in stone and black brick, and tile roofs. It is in two and three stores with basements and attics, and has a U-shaped plan with fronts of three bays. The garden front has a recessed centre with a square tower to the left and a gabled bay to the right, and in the centre are double steps with a landing and a ramped coped balustrade wall, and a lean-to porch. The tower has a pyramidal roof, the top floor is timber framed with brick nogging, and it contains a bay window with a hipped roof. At the rear is a canted bay window with a spire roof, and to its left is a hipped dormer. The boundary wall is in brick and stone, and has a plinth, buttresses, and shaped coping. In the centre is a gabled lych gate. | II |
| 62 and 64 Castle Boulevard; 52.94739°N 1.16417°W | | Late 1880s | A pair of houses, later offices, designed by Watson Fothergill, in red brick on a plinth, with blue brick dressings, a string course, tile roofs and gables with bargeboards and finials. The windows are sashes with mullions and transoms. There are two storeys and attics, a T-shaped plan, and four bays, the outer bays recessed. On the ground floor are canted bay windows, the upper floor has three-light windows under moulded brick segmental arches, and in the attics are two-light windows with segmental heads. In the angle of the outer bays are octagonal turrets with a spire roof, and a door with a fanlight. | II |
| 3 and 4 Huntindon Drive and external corridors 52.95034°N 1.15860°W | | 1888–89 | A pair of houses designed by Watson Fothergill in red brick with a stone basement, dressings in blue brick and stone, and tile roofs with a cast iron crest. There are two storeys, basements and attics, and four bays. The main, garden, front has a projecting central block with a hipped roof, the basement has arched openings, and on the ground floor is a central round-arched opening and sash windows, the left window bowed. On the upper floor are two bay windows with hipped roofs, and in the attics is a strip of timber framing with brick nogging, and two hipped through-eaves dormers. At the rear are two glazed external corridors giving access to the houses, the left entrance with a coped gable and a shouldered doorway with shafts, and between the entrances is an outbuilding with a hipped roof. | II |
| Memorial bust 52.94979°N 1.15573°W | — | c. 1890 | The bust stands to the northwest of the Castle Museum, and commemorates Major Jonathan White, who was the first commander of the Robin Hood Rifles. It consists of a life-size bronze bust, on a square tapered pink granite pedestal, about 1.5 metres (4 ft 11 in) tall. The pedestal is encircled by a bronze foliage wreath and a ribbon. | II |
| Castle Court and railings 52.94833°N 1.15403°W | | 1894 | A warehouse, designed by Watson Fothergill and converted for other uses in 1983, it is in red brick, with dressings in blue brick and stone, and artificial slate roofs. There are two storeys, basement and attics, four ranges enclosing a courtyard, a front range of eleven bays, and side wings of 13 bays. In the centre is a cart entrance flanked by square tower porches with octagonal spires, the left porch with steps leading to a side door. The outer bays project as corner towers with pyramidal roofs, and contain segmental-arched cart entrances. The bays between have sash windows on the ground floor and cross-casements above, and in the attics are groups of three-light round-arched windows. In front of the building are cast iron railings. | II |
| Park House; 52.95337°N 1.16420°W | | c. 1896 | A house, designed by Watson Fothergill, in red brick on a plinth, with dressings in stone and terracotta, and tile roofs, the gables with bargeboards, tie beams and arch braces. There are two storeys and four bays. The left gable has a framework of terracotta mullions and transoms, the panels containing ornaments in relief. On the ground floor is a door with sidelights, and above it are stair windows. The projecting right gable has a shallow two-storey canted bay window, and between the floors are terracotta relief panels. | II |
| Bandstand and railings 52.94975°N 1.15332°W | | 1897 | The bandstand is in an area to the northeast of Castle Museum, and was designed by Arthur Brown. It is in wood, partly glazed, on a stone plinth with a slate roof and a weather vane. It has an octagonal plan, angle pilasters and traceried sash windows. The bandstand is enclosed by wrought iron railings and a gate. | II |
| Corporation waterworks and railings 52.94883°N 1.15235°W | | 1900 | The depot on a corner site, later used as offices, was designed by Herbert Walker. It is in red brick on a plinth, with stone dressings, sill bands, and roofs of slate and sheet metal. There are two storeys and an L-shaped plan, with ranges of seven and 13 bays. The openings have segmental heads and keystones. On the corner is an angled bay with a shaped gable, a segmental pediment and a coat of arms. It contains a carriage entrance with wrought iron gates, with paired round-headed windows above. The end bay on Castle Boulevard has a shaped gable, and contains a two-storey canted bay window, and there is another shaped gabled bay along Castle Street. In the yard at the rear is a canopy on cast iron columns, and in front of the building is a wrought iron railing. | II |
| Albert Hall; 52.95440°N 1.15633°W | | 1906–09 | A Methodist church, later an entertainment centre, designed by A. E. Lambert in Baroque Revival style. It is in brick with terracotta cladding on the front, the ground floor rusticated, with a sill band, a pierced balustrade, and a hipped slate roof. There are three storeys, five bays, and a tower on the right. The middle bay projects and contains two Ionic columns and a broken segmental pediment. The side bays also project, they are narrower and surmounted by attic dormers under pediments. The bays between contain windows with pilasters and open pediments with elongated keystones. The tower has three stages with rusticated clasping buttresses rising to domed pinnacles, and at the top is a round turret with Ionic columns, round-arched openings with segmental pediments, and an ogee dome and finial. On the right return are five Diocletian windows. | II |
| Park Estate Office; 52.94982°N 1.15813°W | | 1909 | The estate office is in red brick, and timber framing with mainly rendered infill, and has stone dressings and tile roofs. There is a single storey and attics, and most of the windows are cross-casements. In the middle of the north front is a Tudor arched doorway with a box dormer above, to the right is a gabled wing, to the left is a larger gable, and further to the left is an entrance with a wooden balustrade and a timber-framed screen wall. On the east front is a canted bay window, and in the west front is a segmental-headed doorway with a fanlight and a box dormer above. To the right of the south front is a gabled wing with a bow window. | II |
| 84 Friar Lane, railings and gateway 52.95152°N 1.15326°W | | 1910 | An office building in stone on a plinth, with a sill band, a pulvinated frieze, a dentilled cornice and a slate roof. There are two storeys and four bays, and the windows are casements with mullions and transoms. In each outer bay is a two-storey bow window, and above them is a shouldered gable containing a cartouche. The doorway has panelled pilasters, and a segmental pediment containing a cartouche. The windows on the upper floor have two lights divided by Ionic columns, and raised panels with keystones. Along the front of the building is an ornamental wrought iron railing on a moulded stone plinth, containing double gates with openwork piers. | II |
| Gateway and railings, Greek Orthodox Church of the Virgin Mary Eleousa; 52.95520°N 1.16486°W | | c. 1910 | The gateway is in red brick with stone dressings. At the entrance is a pointed arch with a traceried gable, and cross-gabled square piers with niches. It contains a pair of wrought iron spiked gates. The gateway is flanked by spiked railings on a brick plinth with chamfered coping, and there are square piers with pyramidal capitals. | II |
| Former Territorial Army Centre and railings 52.95534°N 1.16447°W | | 1910–12 | The building, designed by Brewill and Baily, is in red brick, the ground floor in rusticated stone, on a plinth, with stone dressings, rusticated angle pilasters, an eaves cornice, a coped parapet with a central balustrade, and flat asphalt roofs. There are four storeys and fronts of nine and five bays. The windows are sashes, those on the ground floor with segmental heads, and those on the first and second floors with elongated keystones. In the centre is a round-arched carriage entrance with a rusticated surround and wrought iron gates. The middle three bays project slightly, they are in stone, and the bays are divided by Ionic pilasters. The middle window on the first floor has a segmental pediment, and on the top floor is a central Diocletian window flanked by round windows, all with foliage surrounds. On the east side is an area railing. | II |
| War Memorial Cross, St Peter's Church, Radford; 52.96049°N 1.17925°W | | c. 1918 | The war memorial is in the churchyard to the north of the church. It is a cross in stone and has a tapering square shaft with chamfered corners, standing on an inscribed square pedestal and square base of two steps. | II |
| Memorial Nurses' Home; 52.95078°N 1.15531°W | | 1919–23 | The nurses' home, later converted into flats, was designed by Robert Evans. It is in red brick on a plinth, with stone dressings, a main cornice, a coped parapet forming a balcony to the upper attics, and a green slate mansard roof. Most of the windows are paired sashes with slightly segmental rubbed brick heads, burnt brick surrounds, and keystones. There are three storeys and attics and 15 bays, the centre and outer bays projecting, and the outer bays defined by pilasters. In the middle is a portico with three storeys and three bays, giant Ionic columns in antis, and a lettered frieze. At the rear is a central two-storey portico with double Ionic columns and a pediment. | II |
| War Memorial Sundial, northeast of the Castle Museum; 52.95007°N 1.15323°W | — | c. 1920 | The sundial, commemorating those lost in both World Wars, is in Portland stone. It consists of a traceried octagonal column on a stepped octagonal base, about 1 metre (3 ft 3 in) tall. It has a brass dial and inscribed bronze plaques. | II |
| Statue of Captain Albert Ball; 52.94999°N 1.15382°W | | 1921 | The statue in the grounds of Nottingham Castle commemorates Albert Ball, a fighter pilot in the First World War. It is by Henry Poole on a plinth designed by E. A. Rickards. The statue is in bronze, and depicts the pilot looking upwards, and behind him is an allegorical figure representing Air. This stands on a moulded pedestal in Portland stone, with inscriptions on two sides, and reliefs of a plane on the other sides. The pedestal is on a base of grey granite on three lobed steps, with bronze ornamentation. | I |
| Gateway and wall, Memorial Nurses' Home; 52.95103°N 1.15490°W | | 1921–23 | The gateway and wall were designed by Robert Evans. The boundary wall is in red brick with moulded brick coping, it contains square brick piers with stone corniced caps, and extends for about 50 metres (160 ft). At the north end is a gateway with wrought iron double gates and a single gates, and openwork cast iron piers, and at the south end are three panels of railing with brick piers. | II |
| War Memorial, wall and railings, Memorial Nurses' Home; 52.95060°N 1.15526°W | | 1921–23 | The retaining wall is in stone, extending for about 80 metres (260 ft) long with a slight curve, it is divided by pilasters and surmounted by a cast iron railing. Three bays project slightly and contain a bronze plaque flanked by wreaths and torches. To the left, the wall is stepped back, and there is a lower screen wall about 20 metres (66 ft) long, with a central round-arched gateway flanked by rusticated piers. | II |
| The Howitt Building; 52.95344°N 1.17567°W | | 1931 | Originally the main office of the Raleigh Bicycle Company, it was designed by T. Cecil Howitt. The building is in red brick with limestone dressings and a tile roof. There are two storeys, and in the centre is a three-bay stone portico with wide end piers, between which are two square columns with chamfered corners and moulded capitals carrying an entablature and a plain parapet. The portico is flanked by long office ranges, the bays divided by pilasters, on a deep stone plinth. Between the upper and lower windows are metal panels with reliefs by Charles Doman depicting putti making bicycles. Above the ranges is a plain stone entablature. | II |
| Newcastle House and wall 52.94844°N 1.15276°W | | 1931–33 | A fabric factory later used for other purposes in Art Deco style. It is in reinforced concrete with steel frame curtain walling, reconstituted stone cladding, and a flat roof behind a parapet. There are four storeys and a basement, and a rectangular plan. In the centre of the entrance front are ten narrow bays with vertical stone fins, and a doorway with a moulded surround and a cornice, above which is a square bracket clock. The boundary wall extends along the front for about 60 metres (200 ft) and has flat coping. | II |
| Telephone kiosk adjoining Castle Wall; 52.95065°N 1.15442°W | | 1935 | The K6 type telephone kiosk by the castle wall was designed by Giles Gilbert Scott. Constructed in cast iron with a square plan and a dome, it has three unperforated crowns in the top panels. | II |
| Telephone kiosk opposite Newcastle House; 52.94868°N 1.15352°W | | 1935 | The K6 type telephone kiosk opposite Newcastle Housewas designed by Giles Gilbert Scott. Constructed in cast iron with a square plan and a dome, it has three unperforated crowns in the top panels. | II |
| Former Capitol Cinema; 52.96442°N 1.18057°W | | 1936–37 | The cinema, later used for other purposes, is in red brick and painted reconstituted stone, with a coped parapet. The entrance front has two storeys, and a cylindrical central projection over three doorways with a curving canopy. Above is a central fin flanked by curving steel-framed windows, and above are three horizontal ribs. To the left is a curving stair enclosure with a steel-framed window, and the right return has two prominent string courses. | II |
| Statues of Robin Hood and his Merry Men; 52.95047°N 1.15339°W | | 1952 | A group of three statues in the grounds of Nottingham Castle by James Woodford. Each statue is in bronze on a rusticated stone plinth. One statue depicts Robin Hood, it is about 2 metres (6 ft 7 in) tall, and depicts him in an archery pose aiming towards the castle. To the southeast are statues of two reclining figures, and to the southwest are statues of three reclining figures, all of these representing members of his band. | II |
| Nottingham Playhouse; 52.95387°N 1.15619°W | | 1961–63 | The theatre, designed by Peter Moro, is in reinforced concrete. At the front is a two-story foyer, the ground floor glazed, and the upper floor with opaque white panels and dark glazing. Behind it is a circular auditorium clad in black timber slats, and behind that a taller rectangular fly tower. The proscenium-arch stage is adaptable as an apron or a thrust stage, and can be raised over the orchestra pit and the front stalls. | II* |
