= St Peter's Church, Radford =

Church in Nottingham, England

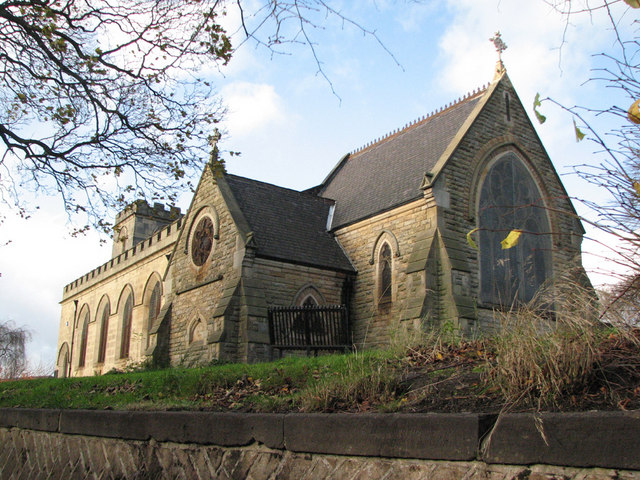
- St Peter's Church, Radford
- 52°57′36.54″N 1°10′45.90″W
- Denomination: Church of England
- Churchmanship: Broad Church

History
- Dedication: Saint Peter

Administration
- Province: York
- Diocese: Southwell and Nottingham
- Parish: Radford, Nottingham

St Peter's Church, Radford is an Anglican parish church in Radford, Nottingham, located at 171 Hartley Road (St. Peter's Park). It is a Grade II listed building as being of special architectural or historic interest.

== History ==
The medieval church was demolished and a new church was built in 1812 at a cost of £2,000 (equivalent to £123,000 in 2025) by the architect Henry Moses Wood. The chancel was rebuilt in 1871–72 to the designs of the architect Richard Charles Sutton. The contractors for the new work were Richard Stevenson and Field Weston and the new chancel cost £1340 (equivalent to £131,000 in 2025). The east window was fitted with stained glass by Heaton, Butler and Bayne representing the crucifixion in memory of the late Mr. J. Sherwin Gregory. The new chancel was consecrated on 25 April 1872 by Rt. Revd. Henry Mackenzie Bishop Suffragan of Nottingham.

== Incumbents ==
- c1200 Silvester
- 1223/4 Radalphus Clericus
- 1226 Thomas De Carlton
- ???? Robert De Wylfeford
- 1292 Richard Poutrell
- 1302 Normanus de Radeforde
- 1312 Richard de Mowkes
- 1332 Richard de Foston
- 1355 William De Chilwell
- 1383 William Galpyn
- 1402 Richard Baron
- 1404 Thomas Alott
- 1405 William de Alfreton
- 1449 Thomas Bevor
- 1452/3 Robert Ribchester
- 1499 William Baladen
- 1521 Alexander Coke
- 1535/6 William Denys
- 1557/8 Thomas Tonkes
- 1563 John Simpson (also Vicar of St Leodegarius Church, Basford 1563-1595)
- 1588 George Turvyn
- 1595 Thomas Thornley
- 1612 Robert Malham (also Rector of St Nicholas Church, Nottingham)
- 1663 William Parker
- 1683 John Vicars
- 1687 John Birch
- 1706 Edward Griffith
- 1707 William Rudsby (also Vicar of Lenton 1693-1731 Curate in charge of Lenton & St. Stephen's Church, Sneinton 1731-2)
- 1731 John Swaile
- 1732 George Wayte (Curate in Charge, Lenton 1731-2)
- 1782 William Pickering,
- 1803 Edward Cresswell (Vicar of Lenton 1803-40)
- 1840 Samuel Cresswell
- 1880 Charles Lea-Wilson
- 1913 Hubert Arnold Gem (formerly vicar of All Saints' Church, Nottingham and St Mary's Church, Wirksworth, also Canon of Southwell)
- 1930 Claude Wilfred Goode
- 1947 Fredrick George Ralph
- 1961 James Stanley Lemon
- 1978 Christopher Gale
- 1984 John Walker
- 1996 Howard Worsley
- 2002 David Edinborough

== Organ ==
A new two-manual organ by Messrs Bevington and Son was installed and opened on 21 March 1869 by W. T. Cockrem, organist of St Paul's Church, George Street, Nottingham. There is currently a two manual pipe organ by William Andrews. A specification of the organ can be found at the National Pipe Organ Register

=== Organists ===
- D. W. Cartwright, c. 1870
- Thomas E. Daws
- Arthur Richards. formerly organist at St Wilfrid's Church, Wilford, afterwards organist at St. John the Baptist's Church, Leenside
- William Henry Hotching (1914 - 1949)

== See also ==
- Listed buildings in Nottingham (Radford and Park ward)
