= Greek Orthodox Church of the Virgin Mary Eleousa =

- Greek: Ιερός Ναός Παναγίας τῆς Ἑλεούσης
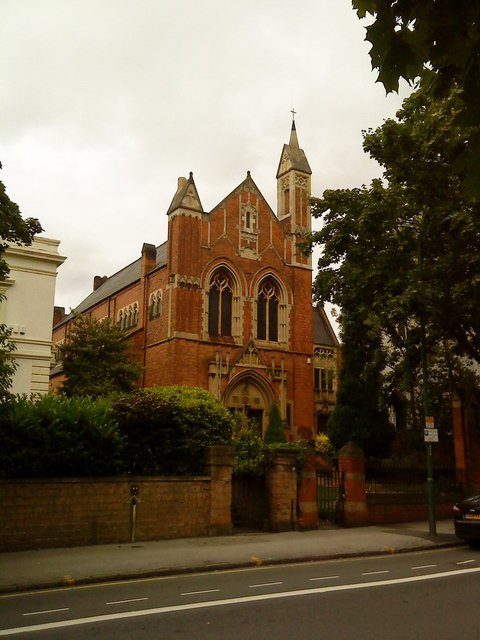
- Greek Orthodox Church of the Virgin Mary Eleousa
- Greek Orthodox Church of the Virgin Mary Eleousa
- 52.9554°N 1.1651°W
- Denomination: Greek Orthodox

History
- Former name: Park Hill Congregational church
- Founded: June 1883
- Dedication: Presentation of the Blessed Virgin Mary

Architecture
- Architect: James Tait

Administration
- Diocese: Greek Orthodox Archdiocese of Thyateira and Great Britain

The Greek Orthodox Church of the Virgin Mary Eleousa (Greek: Ιερός Ναός Παναγίας Ελεούσης) is on Derby Road, Nottingham. It is a Grade II listed building. The church provides liturgies on Sundays and acts as a hub for a community of Greeks, Greek Cypriots, British Cypriots, Greek students in Nottingham and other Orthodox Christians who live in Nottingham.

A church hall annex is used for a Greek community school. The church hall is also used to celebrate events in the calendar of saints and the liturgical year such as Easter, Christmas and other traditions of the Eastern Orthodox Church.

== History ==
An independent congregational group was established in the early nineteenth century in St. James' Church, Standard Hill and were soon large enough to look for their own premises. The foundation was laid in June 1882 and Park Hill Congregational Church opened for worship in June 1883. The architects were James Tait and John Langham of Leicester.

== Organ ==
The church had a pipe organ by Bishop and Son dating from 1884 which was rebuilt by Roger Yates in the 1934. The organ was re-opened on Monday 22 October 1934 by Marcel Dupré.

== See also ==
- Listed buildings in Nottingham (Radford and Park ward)

== Gallery ==
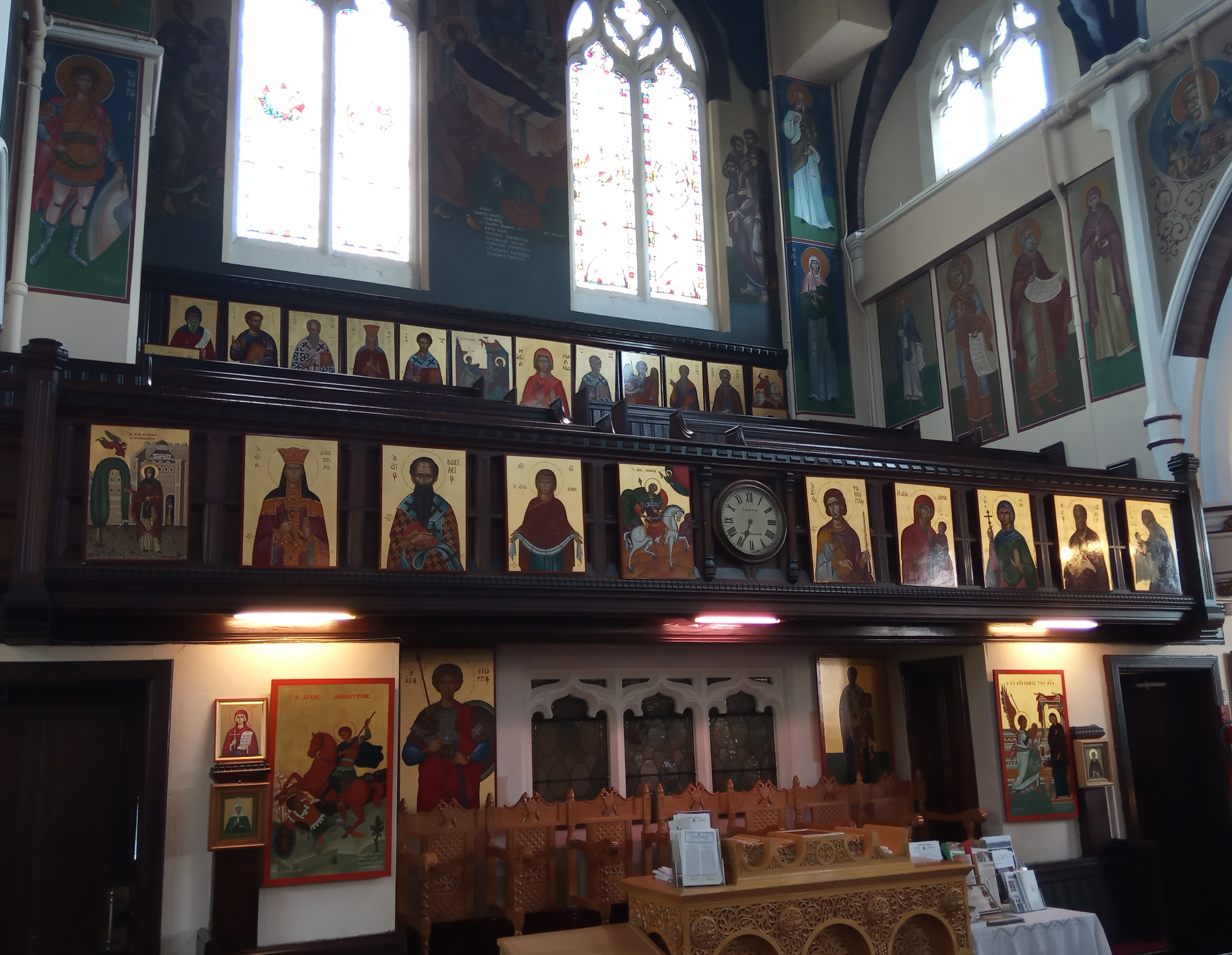
Interior view of the church and the icons on the walls.

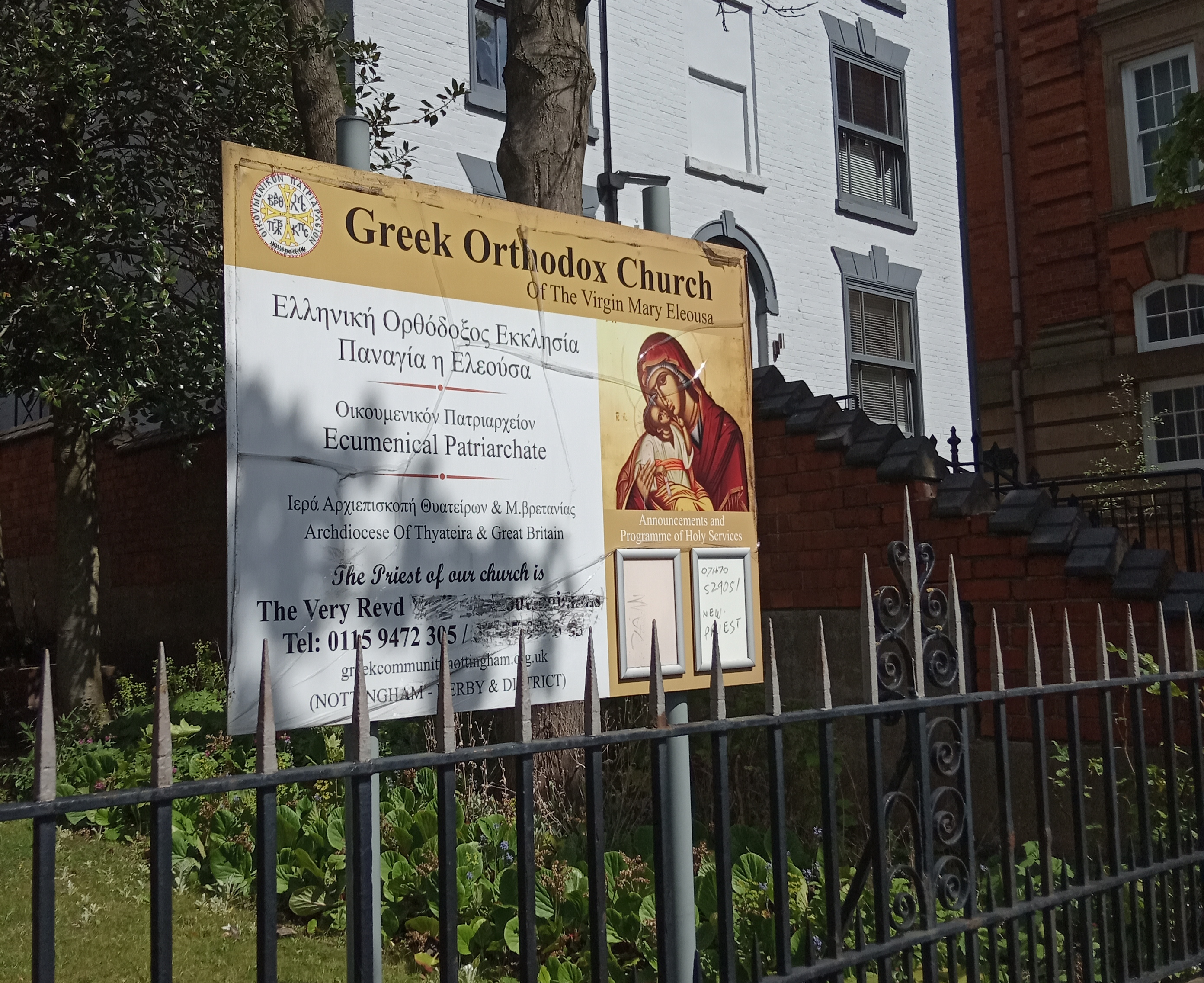
Church sign at the yard of the church.

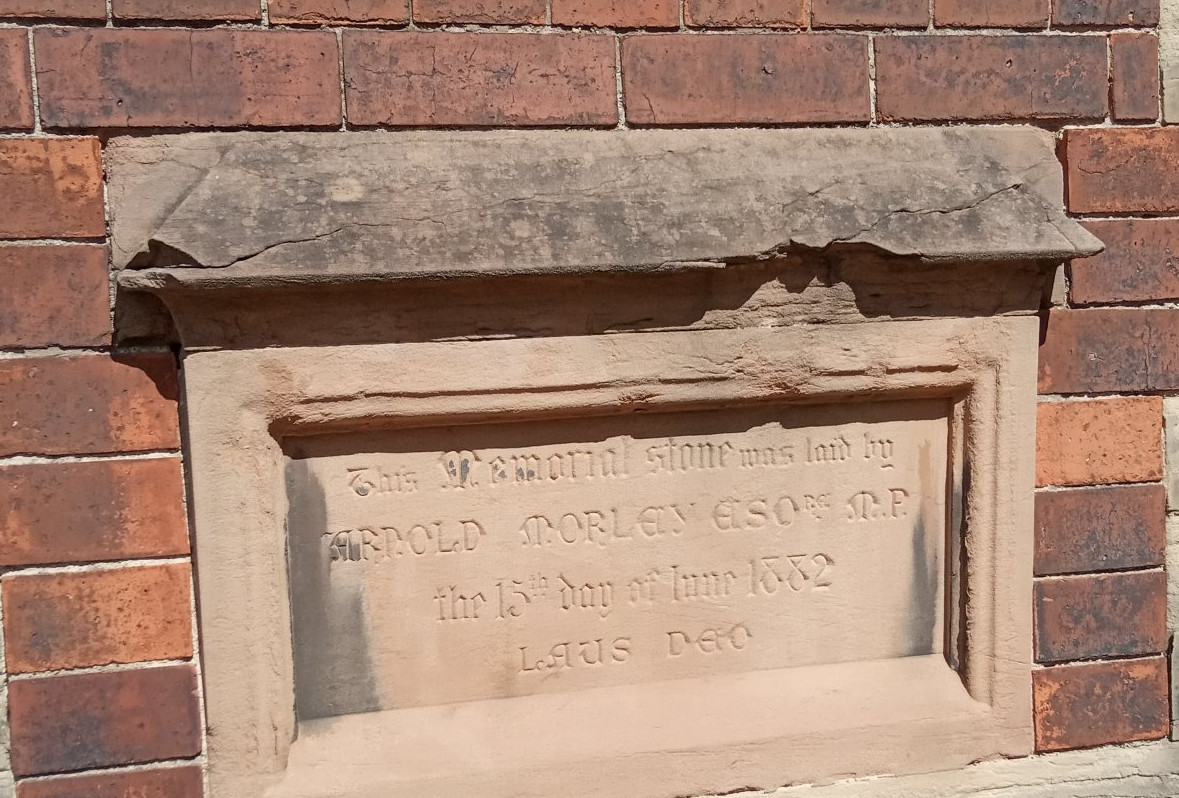
Memorial stone at the walls of Virgin Mary Eleousa church (inscribed date 1882)

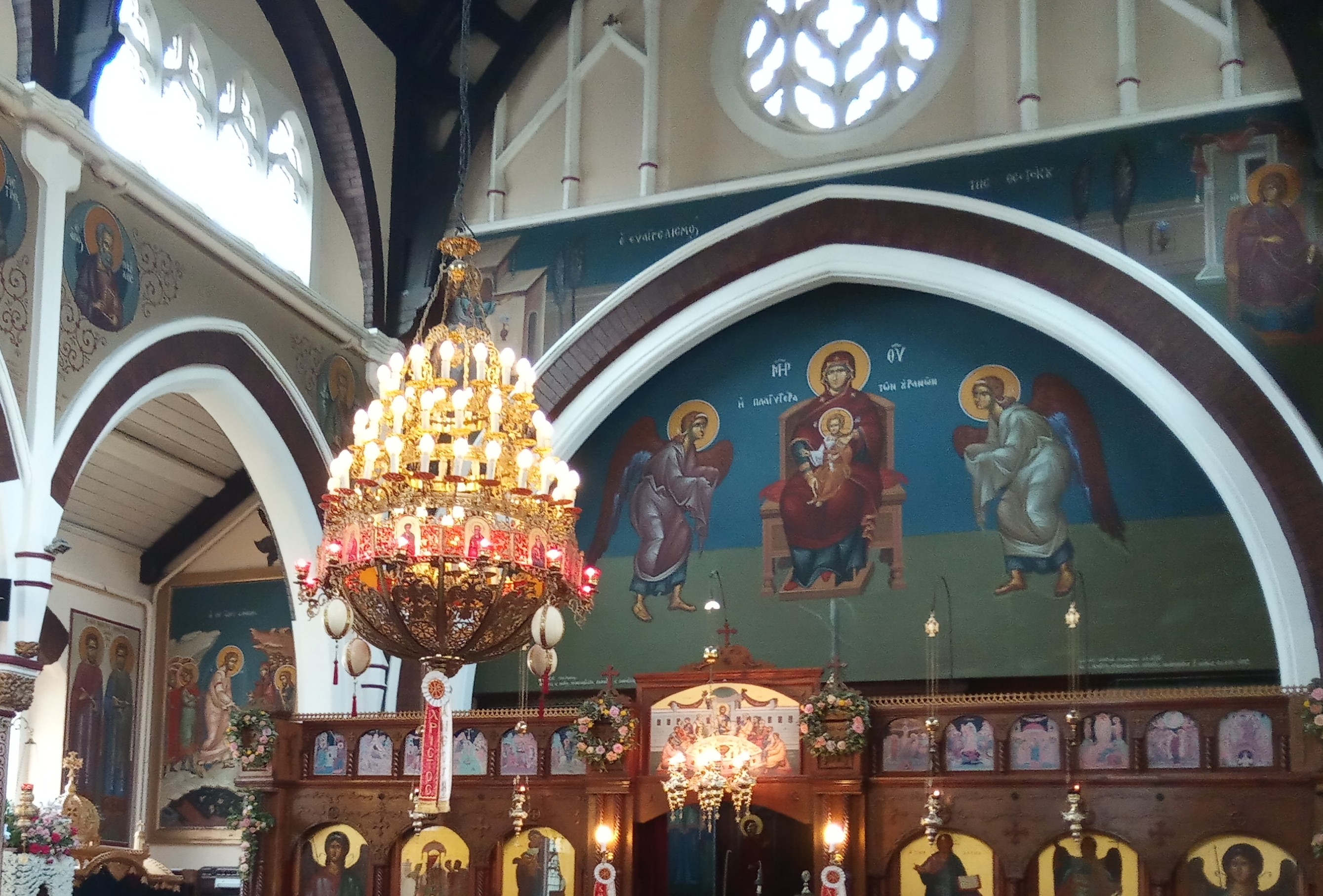
View of Iconostasis and the mural of Theotokos and Christ child over the altar
