= Herbert Walker (architect) =

British architect, surveyor and civil engineer

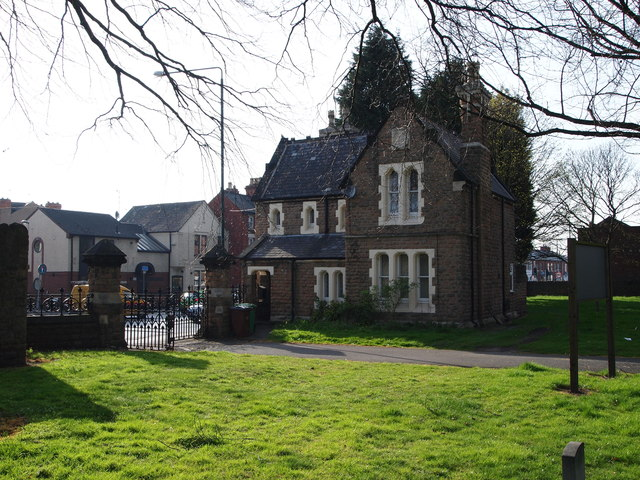
Basford cemetery entrance lodge 1874

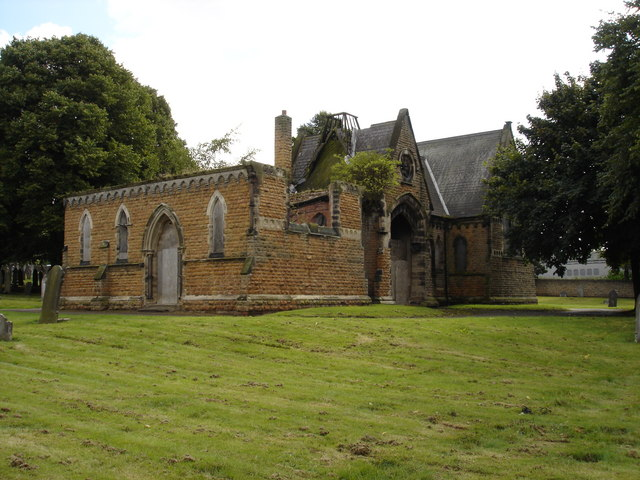
Basford cemetery chapel 1874

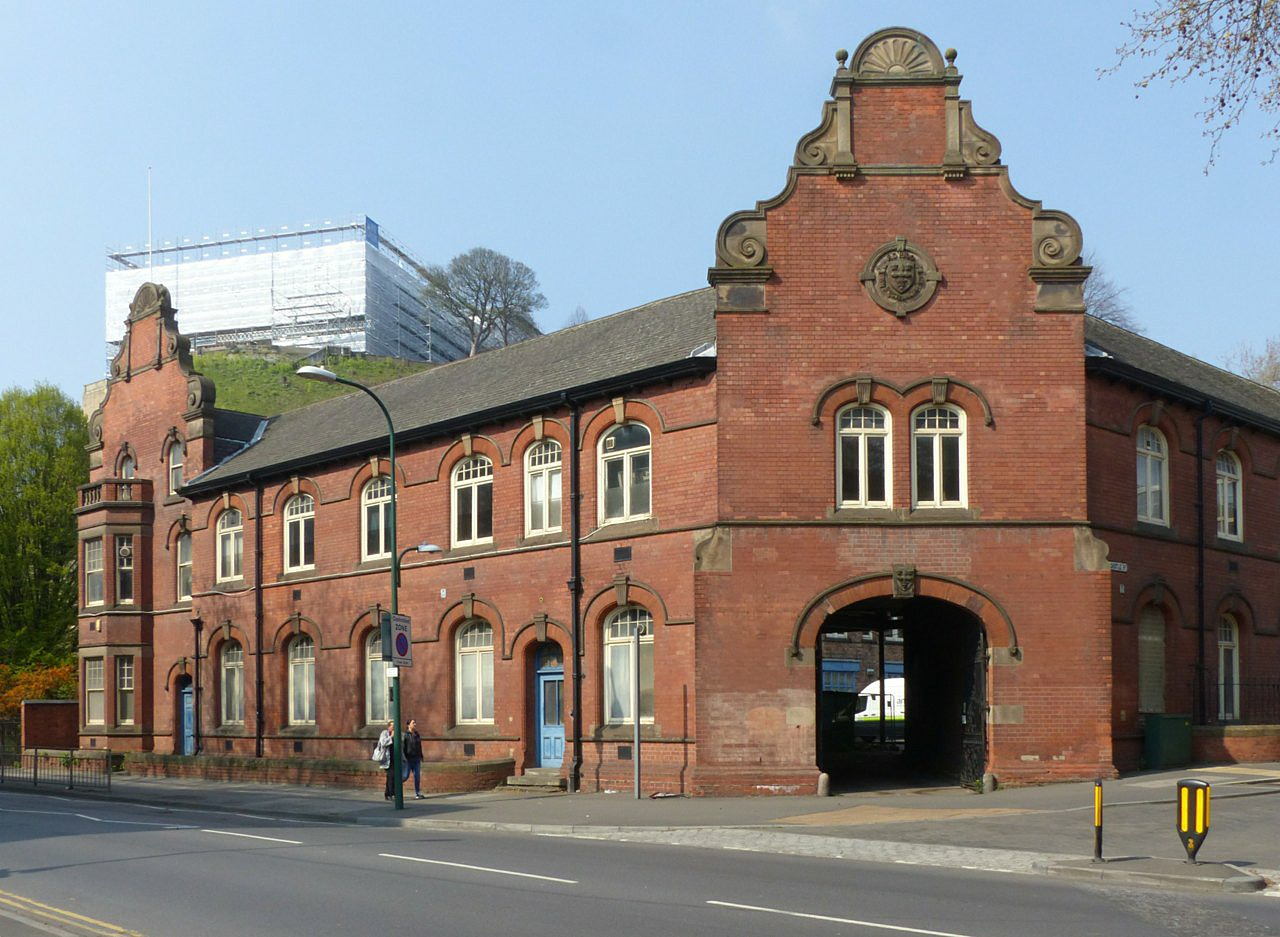
Waterworks office, Castle Boulevard, Nottingham 1899-1900

Lieut-Colonel Herbert Walker FRIBA, M Inst CE, FSI, (1846 - 23 November 1937) was an architect, surveyor and civil engineer based in Nottingham from 1870 to 1923.

== Life ==
He was born in 1846, the son of George Frederick Walker (1800 - 1857) and Eliza Dutton (1807 - 1875).

He studied in the office of his brother Samuel Dutton Walker from 1860 - 1866. He was then articled to Borough Engineer Marriott Ogle Tarbotton from 1866 - 1870 and was engineer and surveyor to Basford Sanitary Authority. When Basford was merged with Nottingham he started his own practice in Nottingham in 1870. He had offices in Newcastle Chambers on Angel Row until around 1907 when he moved to Albion Chambers in King Street.

He was appointed a Fellow of the Royal Institute of British Architects in 1889.

He married Annie Sophia Turner, youngest daughter of John Turner of Edwalton, on 25 January 1872 at Holy Rood Church, Edwalton and they had the following children:

- Ethel Walker (b. 1873)
- Mabel Elizabeth Walker (b. 1878)
- Herbert Spencer Walker (1882 - 1906)
- Frederick Turner Walker (1883 - 1941)
- Marion Walker (b. 1884)
- Dorothy Annie Walker (1889 - 1909)
- Kathleen Marjorie Walker (b. 1892)
- Geoffrey Dutton Walker (became Manchester City Surveyor)

Until 1886 he lived in a house called Church Fields, in Bailey Street, Old Basford.

He spent about 37 years with the Robin Hood Battalion which he joined in 1864 as a cadet. He retired with the rank of Lieut-Colonel. During the First World War he undertook recruiting work and was appointed inspector of machinery for the Royal Engineers.

For seven years, he was church warden at Emmanuel Church, Nottingham.

On retiring from business in 1923 he moved to Blackpool. His wife predeceased him by ten years and he died on 23 November 1937.

== Works ==
- Basford Cemetery, chapel and porter’s lodge. 1874
- Board Schools, Mansfield Road, Sherwood 1878
- Entrance Lodge, Basford Workhouse 1880
- Daybrook Brewery 1881
- Villa Residence for James Acton, Goodwood House, Cross Street, Red Hill, Nottingham 1882. Demolished 1965.
- House and shop for Reuben Walker, Basford 1882
- Beeston Sewerage Works 1882-1883
- Boulevard Hotel, Radford Boulevard, Nottingham 1883
- Jacoby and Co Lace Factory, Daybrook, Nottingham 1883 - 1884
- Beeston Cemetery and Chapel, Wollaton Road, Beeston 1886
- Blidworth Waterworks 1889
- John Robinson Almshouses, Mansfield Road, Sherwood, Nottingham 1889
- Nottingham Castle restoration of kitchen wall 1889-1891
- Waterworks Office, Castle Boulevard, Nottingham 1899-1900
- Burton Joyce Pumping Station, 1899 - 1900
- Primitive Methodist Church, Westgate, Sleaford 1906-1907 (demolished 1964)
