= Castle Boulevard, Nottingham =

Street in Nottingham, England

- Castle Boulevard in 2010 before the introduction of the Western Cycle Corridor Lane

- Location within Nottingham
- Former name: Lenton Boulevard
- Maintained by: Nottingham City Council
- Coordinates: 52.9474°N 1.161°W

Construction
- Construction start: 1883
- Completed: 1884
- Inauguration: September 18, 1884

Castle Boulevard, Nottingham is a street in the city centre of Nottingham, England. The majority of it is part of the A6005 road.

== History ==
In May 1883, Arthur Brown, the Nottingham Borough Engineer, issued a request to contractors for tenders to construct a new road 60 feet (18 m) wide upwards of 1 mile (1.6 km) long to run from Canal Street to the south end of School Street in Lenton. It was described as the Lenton Low Level Road. It involved the construction of a culvert and syphon under London Road and Nottingham Canal and the diversion of the River Leen into the Nottingham Canal. The footpaths were to be ashphalted and the carriageway macadamised with a channel of granite setts. Trees were planned to be planted on either side of the road 20 yards (18 m) apart. The estimate was that 70,000 cubic yards of material would be required to bring the road to the necessary level and fill up the disused part of the River Leen.

The road as pictured in Illustrated London News, 7 July 1888

The borough engineer's estimate for the works was £21,000 (equivalent to £2,207,672 in 2025).. Fourteen contractors supplied bids of between £18,612 and £34,400, and the lowest tender by William Cordon of Tudno House, Wilford Road, Nottingham was accepted. By January 1884 the contractor was declared bankrupt and the Borough Engineer was forced to tender the work to complete the project. This was won by S. Thumbs of Nottingham.

The road was opened by the Mayor of Nottingham, Alderman John Manning on 18 September 1884. The road had been extended beyond School Street in Lenton and it turned north across Church Street. The section opened in 1884 was 1,900 yards (1,700 m). With the additional costs of compensation paid to the tenants of the Fish Pond Gardens the corporation had incurred a cost of £35,000 (equivalent to £3,760,320 in 2025).

Later construction continued the road by 720 yards (660 m) over the junction with Derby Road as far as Ilkeston Road.

In 1899 a new sewer was laid along the road and it is at this date that one of the earliest references to it being known as Castle Boulevard is recorded.

In 1902 Nottingham Corporation Tramways opened a route along Castle Boulevard from Canal Street to Derby Road. The centre poles were replaced by side poles early in 1908. The tramlines were renewed in 1923 as part of a programme to relieve unemployment. The tramway service ceased in 1934 when the route along Castle Boulevard was replaced by motor buses.

A dedicated two-way segregated cycle superhighway along Castle Boulevard was opened in 2016 as part of the Western Cycle Corridor project.

== Trees ==
The Western Cycle Corridor and some of the original trees from 1884

The road contains a number of the original trees planted in 1884. These are fine examples of London plane.

== Notable buildings ==
Just behind modern buildings on the north side of Castle Boulevard are Rock cut houses which are listed as a scheduled monument by Historic England.

=== North side ===
- Waterworks Office 1899–1900 by Herbert Walker Grade II listed
- 62 and 64, Semi-detached houses of 1895 by Fothergill Watson Grade II listed

=== South side ===
- Newcastle House (formerly Vyella House), built as a factory and offices by Frank A. Broadhead for William Hollins & Co, 1931–33. Grade II listed
- Castle Court built as a warehouse for Simons & Pickard, paper merchants by Fothergill Watson in 1894 . Grade II listed

== Gallery ==
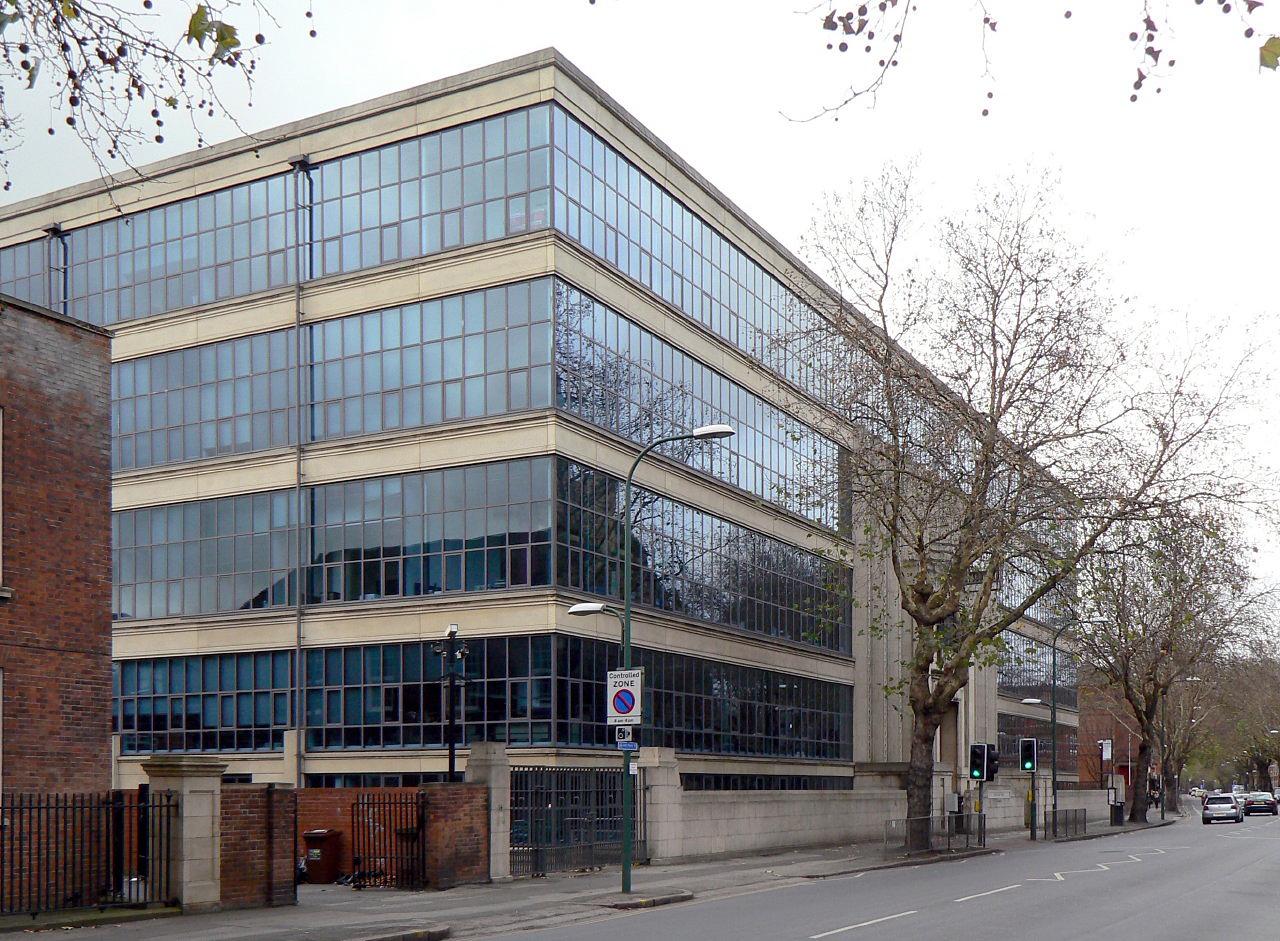
Newcastle House, 1931–33

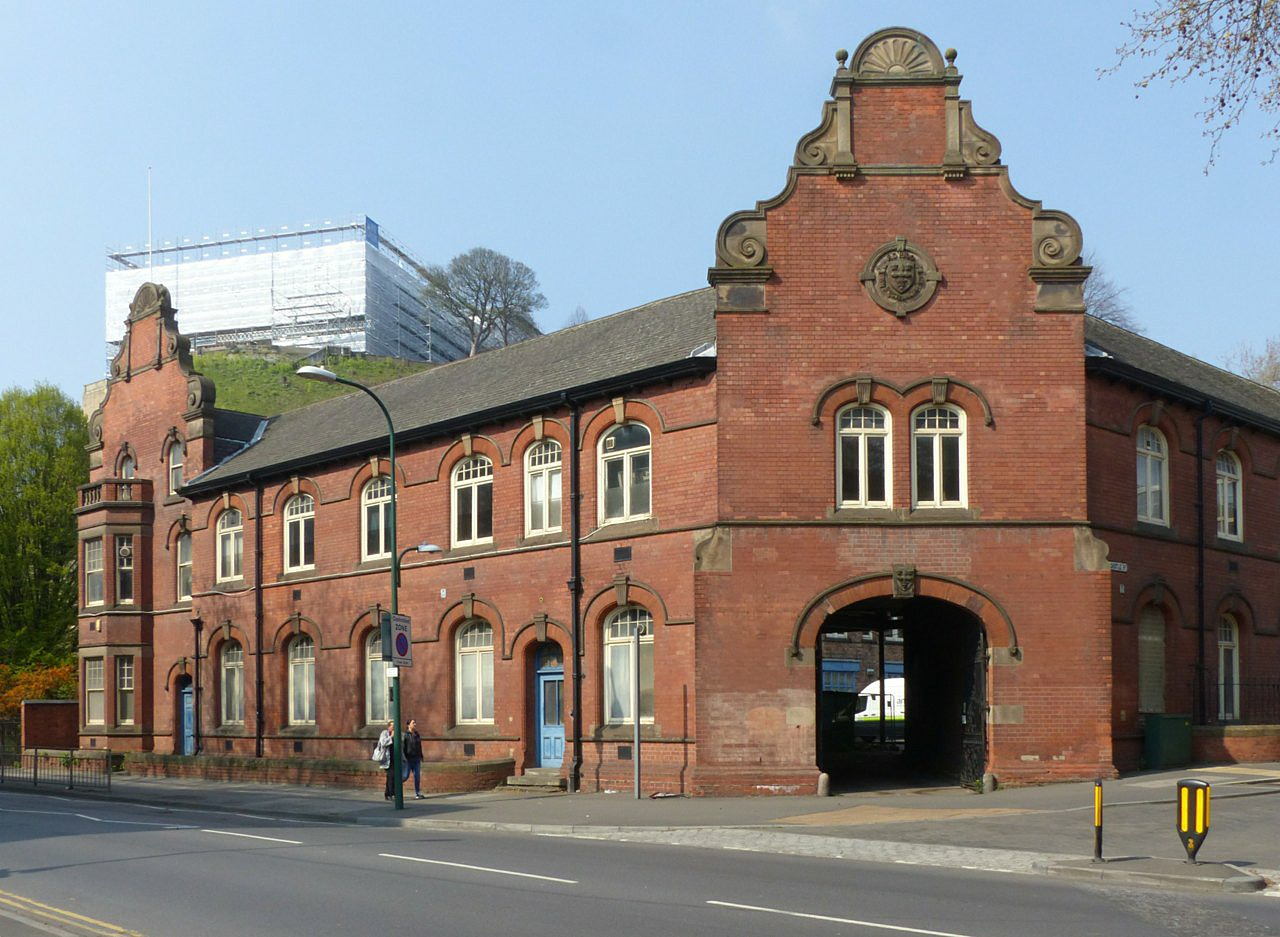
The Waterworks Office 1899–1900

62 and 64 by Fothergill Watson 1895

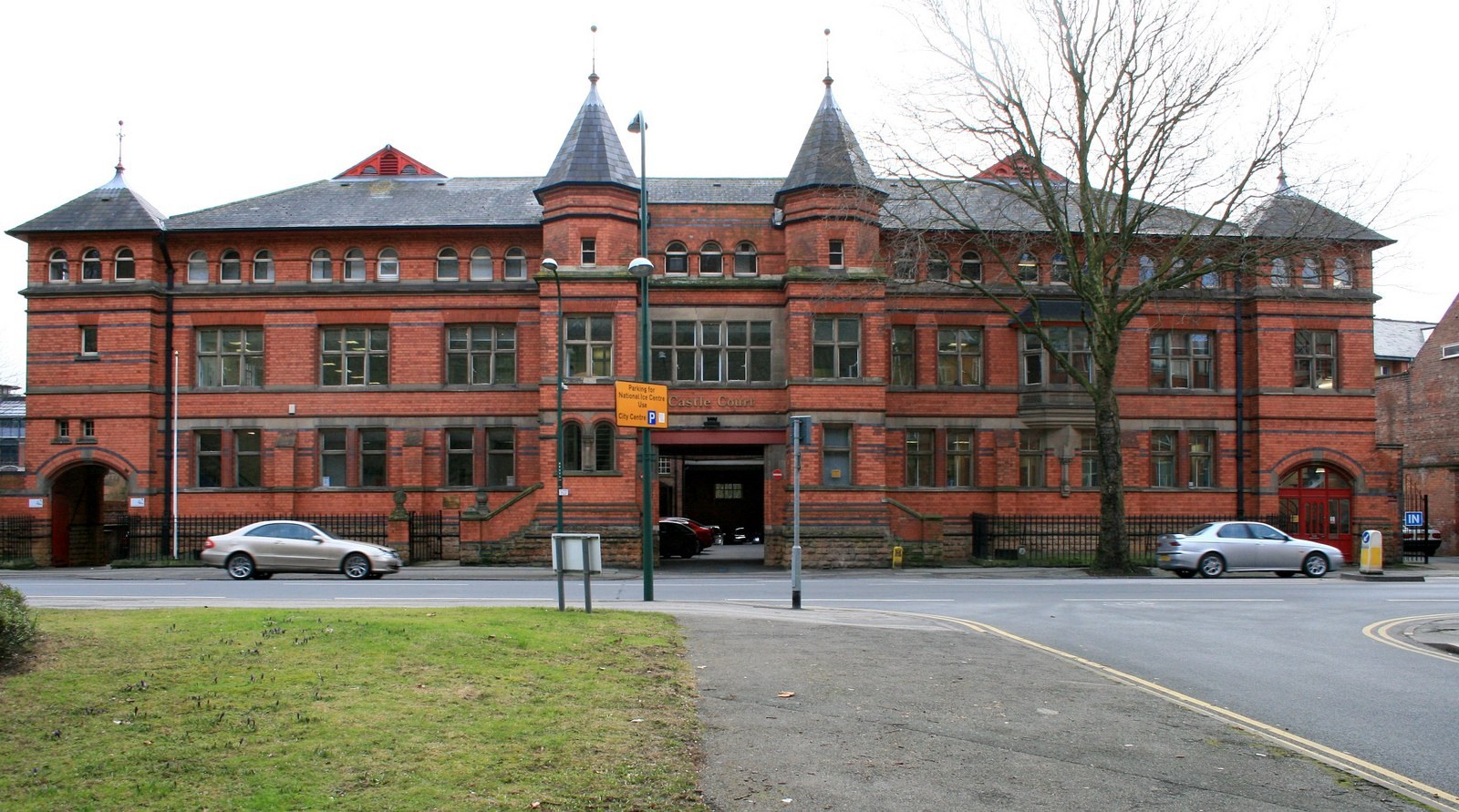
Castle Court 1894
